= List of heaviest bells =

Following is a list of the heaviest bells known to have been cast, and the period of time during which they held that title.

== Heaviest functioning bell in the world ==
The title of heaviest functioning bell in the world has been held chronologically by:

Year	Bell	Weight		Fate
Year	Bell	tonnes	lb	Fate
732	Tōdai-ji	44	96,000	Surpassed
1484	Great Bell of Dhammazedi	294	648,000	Stolen and lost
1608	Tōdai-ji	44	96,000	Surpassed
1633	Chion-in Temple	67	148,000	Surpassed
1810	Mingun Bell	88	195,000	Fell during earthquake (raised again in 1896)
1839	Chion-in Temple	67	148,000	Surpassed
1896	Mingun Bell	88	195,000	Surpassed
1902	Shitennō-ji Temple Bell	114	251,000	Recycled for war
1942	Mingun Bell	88	195,000	Surpassed
2000	Bell of Good Luck	116	256,000	Incumbent

=== The Great Bell of Dhammazedi, Myanmar ===
At approximately 300 tons, the Great Bell of Dhammazedi is the largest bell to have existed in recorded history. Cast in 1484 by King Dhammazedi of Mon, this bell was located at the Shwedagon Pagoda in Rangoon, Burma (now Yangon, Myanmar). The bell was said to be twelve cubits (6.276 m) high and eight cubits (4.184 m) wide.

The Great Bell of Dhammazedi remained at the Shwedagon Pagoda as the heaviest functioning bell in the world until 1608. That year, Portuguese warlord and mercenary Philip de Brito removed it and attempted to carry it by a specially constructed raft down the Yangon River to his stronghold of Thanlyin (later known as Syriam). However, the ship carrying the bell sank at the confluence of the Yangon and Bago rivers. The Dhammazedi Bell remains buried to this day at that location, possibly well-preserved, beneath some 8 metres (26 ft) of sediment. Numerous attempts have been made to locate and recover the bell, thus far without success.

So while the Great Bell of Dhammazedi might indeed be the heaviest bell in the world, it must be disqualified from consideration as such, until it has been recovered and restored to a functional status.

=== The Chion-in Temple Bell ===
Cast in 1633, the 74-ton Chion-in Temple Bell, located in Kyoto, Japan, held the title of heaviest functioning bell in the world until 1810.

From March 1839 until March 1896, the Mingun Bell was not functional due to the fact that it was not hanging freely from its shackles. During this period, the Chion-in Temple Bell regained its former title.

=== The Mingun Bell ===
Cast in 1808, the 90-ton Mingun Bell in Mingun, Sagaing Division, Burma became the heaviest functioning bell in the world from its suspension in 1810 until 23 March 1839. On that date, it was knocked off its supports by a large earthquake.

The Mingun Bell was resuspended in March 1896 by a team of men from the Irrawaddy Flotilla Company. The Mingun Bell was again the world's heaviest functioning bell from its resuspension in 1896 until 1902.

The Mingun Bell regained its status as the heaviest functioning bell in the world in 1942 and held that title until 2000.

=== The Shitennō-ji Temple Bell ===
In 1902, the newly-cast 114-ton Shitennō-ji Temple Bell was hung in Osaka, Japan. The Shitennō-ji Temple Bell reigned as the heaviest functioning bell in the world from that year until 1942, when it was melted down for its metal to assist with the then-ongoing World War II effort.

=== The Bell of Good Luck ===
Cast on New Year's Eve 2000, the Bell of Good Luck is located in the Foquan Temple in Pingdingshan, Henan, China. The bell weighs 116 tonnes (256,000 lb) and it is 810.8 cm (319.2 in) in height and 511.8 cm (201.5 in) in diameter. The Bell of Good Luck has therefore claimed the title of heaviest functioning bell in the world since its construction in 2000, up to the present date.

== The Tsar Bell ==
The 216-ton Russian Tsar Bell (also known as the Tsar Kolokol III) on display on the grounds of the Moscow Kremlin is the heaviest bell known to exist in the world today. However, a very large piece broke off from the Tsar Bell during a fire which engulfed the tower the bell was intended to be hung in, so this irreparably damaged bell has never been suspended or rung. The Tsar Bell cannot be considered as the heaviest functioning bell in the world due to its inability to serve as a percussion instrument. Rather, it may be considered to be the largest bell, or at least the largest bell-shaped sculpture in the world.

== Existing bells ==
Bells weighing 25 tonnes or more:

Name of bell (or edifice containing bell)	Location	Weight	Year cast	Manufacturer or foundry	Notes
Tsar Bell	Moscow Kremlin, Moscow, Russia	201,924 kg (445,166 lb)	1735	Ivan Feodorovich Motorin	broken
Bell of Good Luck	Foquan Temple, Fodushan Scenic Area, Pingdingshan, Henan, China	116,000 kg (256,000 lb)	2000	Tianrui Group	currently the heaviest functioning bell in the world
Mingun Bell	Mingun, Myanmar	90,718 kg (199,998 lb)	1808	King Bodawpaya	Weighs 55,555 viss, or exactly 199,998 pounds.
Tsarsky Kolokol	Trinity Lavra of St. Sergius, Sergiyev Posad, Moscow Oblast, Russia	71,800 kg (158,400 lb)	2004	Zavod imeni Likhacheva, Moscow, Russia	
Chion-in Temple Bell	Kyoto, Japan	67,000 kg (148,000 lb)	1633	unknown	
Great Uspensky Bell (also known as Great Assumption Bell)	Moscow Kremlin, Moscow, Russia	65,522 kg (144,452 lb)	1817	Yakov Zavyalov and Rusinov	
Tōdai-ji Temple Bell	Nara, Japan	44,000 kg (96,000 lb)	732	unknown	
Yongle Bell	Da Zhong Si (Great Bell Temple), Beijing, China	42,000 kg (93,000 lb)	ca. 1420	unknown	
Name unknown	Moscow, Russia	40,000 kg (88,000 lb)	1600	Andrey Chokhov	
Tharrawaddy Min Bell	Shwedagon Pagoda, Yangon, Myanmar	38,000 kg (84,000 lb)	1842	Maha Sithu and Maha Min Kyaw Thinkhaya	
Gotenba Bell	Toki no Sumika Park, Gotemba, Shizuoka, Japan	36,170 kg (79,750 lb)	2006	Royal Eijsbouts bell foundry	
Đại hồng chung	Bai Dinh Pagoda, Gia Vien, Ninh Binh, Vietnam	35,986 kg (79,336 lb)	2007	Nguyễn Văn Sở, Huế, Vietnam	
Blagovestnik (also known as Firstborn)	Trinity Lavra of St. Sergius, Sergiyev Posad, Moscow Oblast, Russia	35,490 kg (78,250 lb)	2002	Zavod imeni Likhacheva, Moscow, Russia	
Savvino-Storozhevsky Monastery	Zvenigorod, Moscow Oblast, Russia	35,000 kg (77,000 lb)	2003	Vera LLC, Shilova, Voronezh, Russia	
Yuriev Monastery	Veliky Novgorod, Novgorod Oblast, Russia	34,399 kg (75,837 lb)		unknown	
World Peace Bell	Newport, Kentucky, U.S.	33,285 kg (73,381 lb)	1998	Fonderie Paccard	
Kazansky Monastery	Tambov, Tambov Oblast, Russia	32,761 kg (72,226 lb)		unknown	
Kirillo-Belozersky Monastery	Kirillov and Belozersk, Vologda Oblast, Russia	32,761 kg (72,226 lb)		unknown	
Saint Isaac's Cathedral	Saint Petersburg, Russia	30,477 kg (67,191 lb)	mid-19th century	unknown	
Torzhestvennyj Bell	Cathedral of Christ the Saviour, Moscow, Russia	27,102 kg (59,749 lb)	1878	unknown	
Evangelist (bell)	Trinity Lavra of St. Sergius, Sergiyev Posad, Moscow Oblast, Russia	26,900 kg (59,400 lb)	2002	Zavod imeni Likhacheva, Moscow, Russia	
Saint Sophia Cathedral	Veliky Novgorod, Novgorod Oblast, Russia	26,438 kg (58,286 lb)	1659	unknown	
Big Bell (People's Salvation Cathedral)	People's Salvation Cathedral, Bucharest, Romania	25,190 kg (55,534 lb)	2016	Grassmayr	
St. Petersglocke	Cologne Cathedral, Cologne, Germany	23,900 kg (52,800 lb)	1923	Heinrich Ulrich	The heaviest bell in the world which hangs on a straight bar.
Sysoi	Assumption Cathedral in Rostov, Rostov-Velikij, Yaroslavl Oblast, Russia	24,000 kg (52,000 lb)	1689	Flor Terentyev	
Singu Min Bell	Shwedagon Pagoda, Yangon, Myanmar	23,000 kg (50,600 lb)	1779	Singu Min	
Vox Patris	Sanctuary of the Eternal Father, Trindade, Brazil	55,000 kg (121,000 lb)	2017	Rduch Bells&Clocks, Poland	The heaviest swinging bell in the world.

== Destroyed or lost bells ==
Bells weighing 25 tonnes or more, no longer in existence (lost or destroyed):

Name of bell (or edifice containing bell)	Location	Weight	Year cast	Manufacturer or foundry	Notes
Great Bell of Dhammazedi	Shwedagon Pagoda, Yangon, Myanmar	294,000 kg (648,000 lb)	1484	King Dhammazedi	submerged in the Bago River in 1608; may be recoverable
Shitennō-ji Temple Bell	Osaka, Japan	114,000 kg (251,000 lb)	1902	unknown	destroyed 1942
Tsarsky Kolokol Bell (aka "Trotzkoi Bell")	Trinity Lavra of St. Sergius, Sergiyev Posad, Moscow Oblast, Russia	144,452 lb (65,522 kg)	1748	unknown	destroyed 1930
Savvino-Storozhevsky Monastery	Zvenigorod, Moscow Oblast, Russia	34,821 kg (76,767 lb)	1667	unknown	destroyed 1941
Godunov Bell (also known as Old Assumption Bell, or Resurrection Bell)	Trinity Lavra of St. Sergius, Sergiyev Posad, Moscow Oblast, Russia	30,304 kg (66,809 lb)	ca. 1600	Andrey Chokhov	destroyed 1701
Kaiserglocke	Cologne Cathedral, Cologne, Germany	27,740 kg (61,160 lb)	1874	Andreas Hamm	destroyed 1918

== Gallery ==
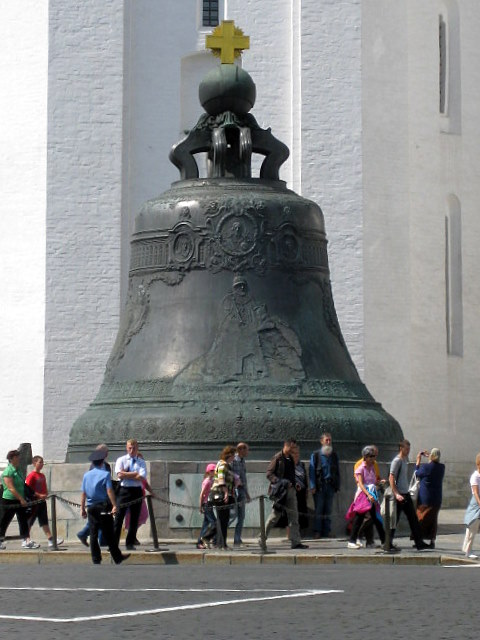
Tsar Bell (Moscow, Russia)

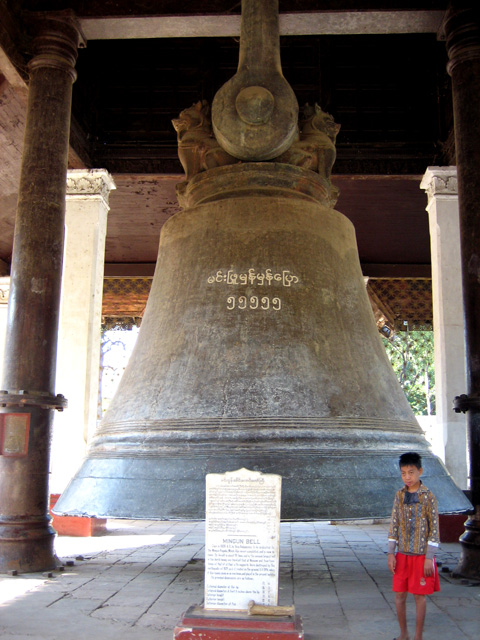
Mingun Bell (Mingun, Myanmar)

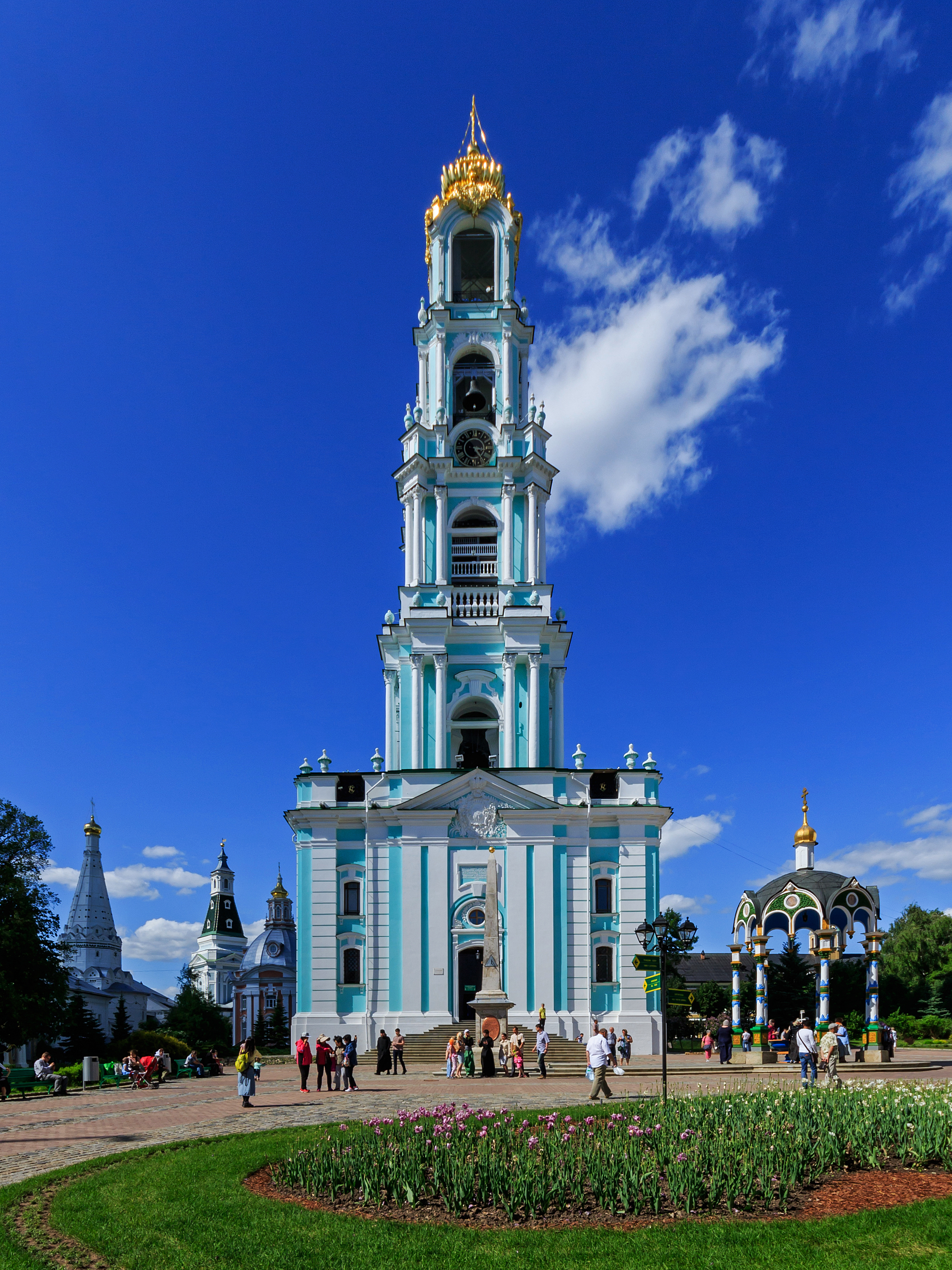
Bell Tower, Trinity Lavra of St. Sergius (Moscow, Russia)

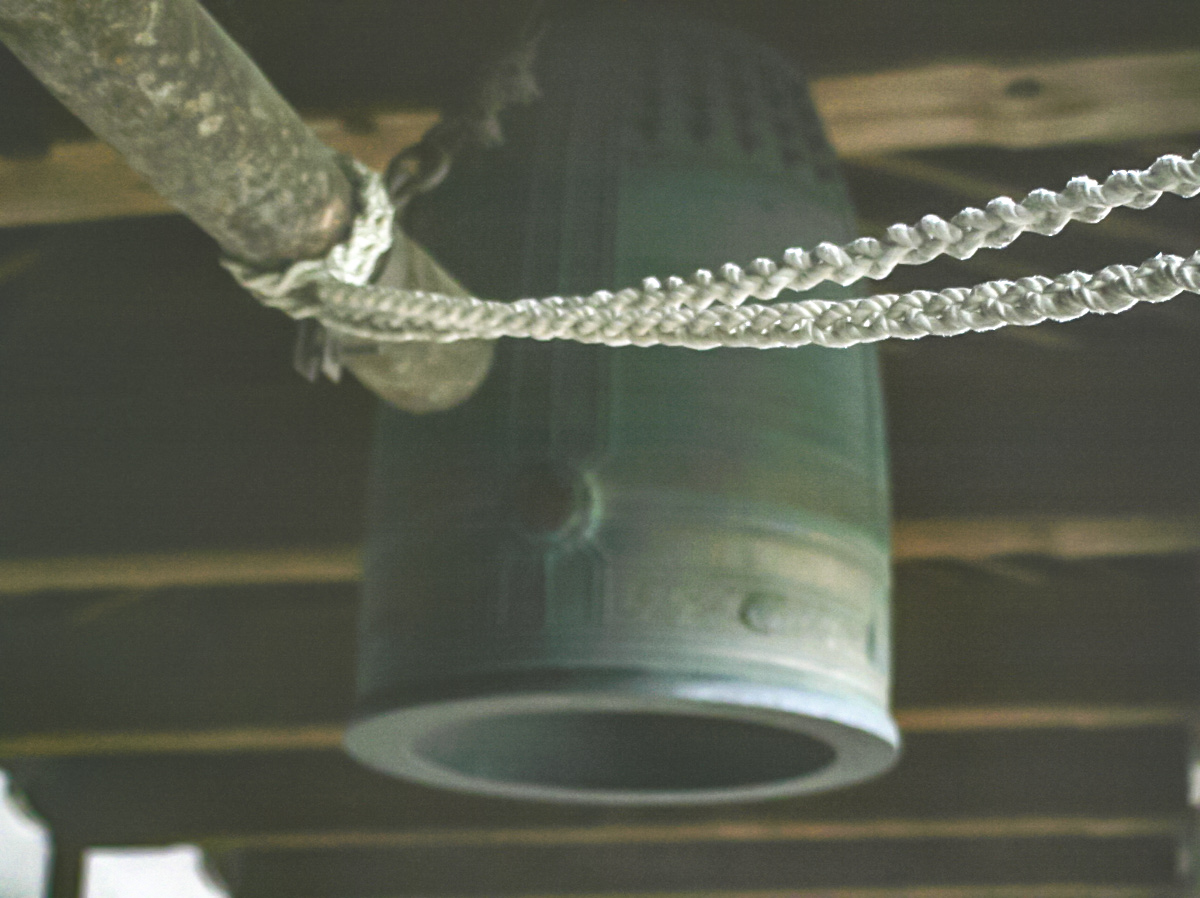
Chion-in Temple Bell (Kyoto, Japan)

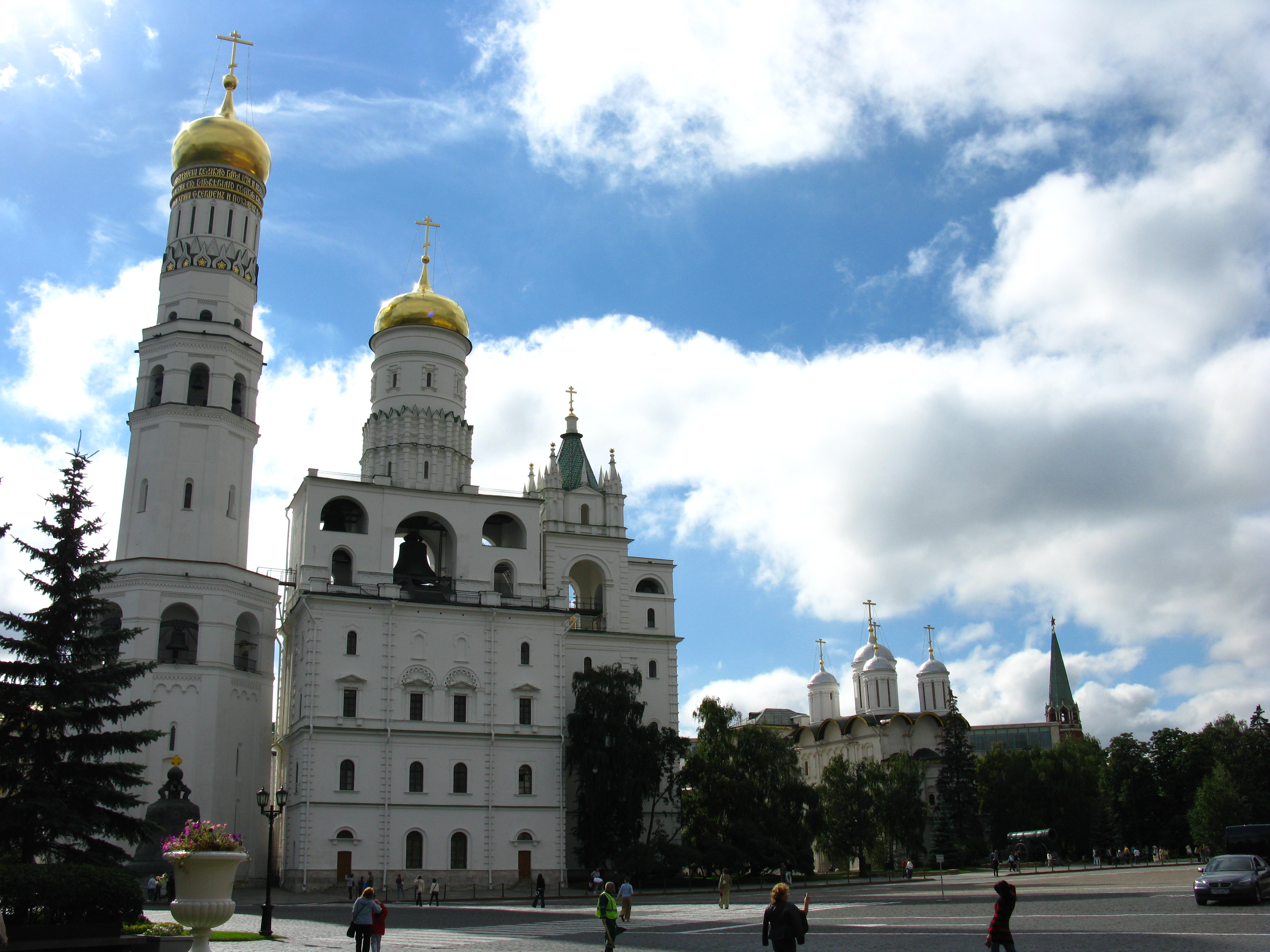
Ivan the Great Bell Tower and Assumption Belfry (Moscow, Russia)

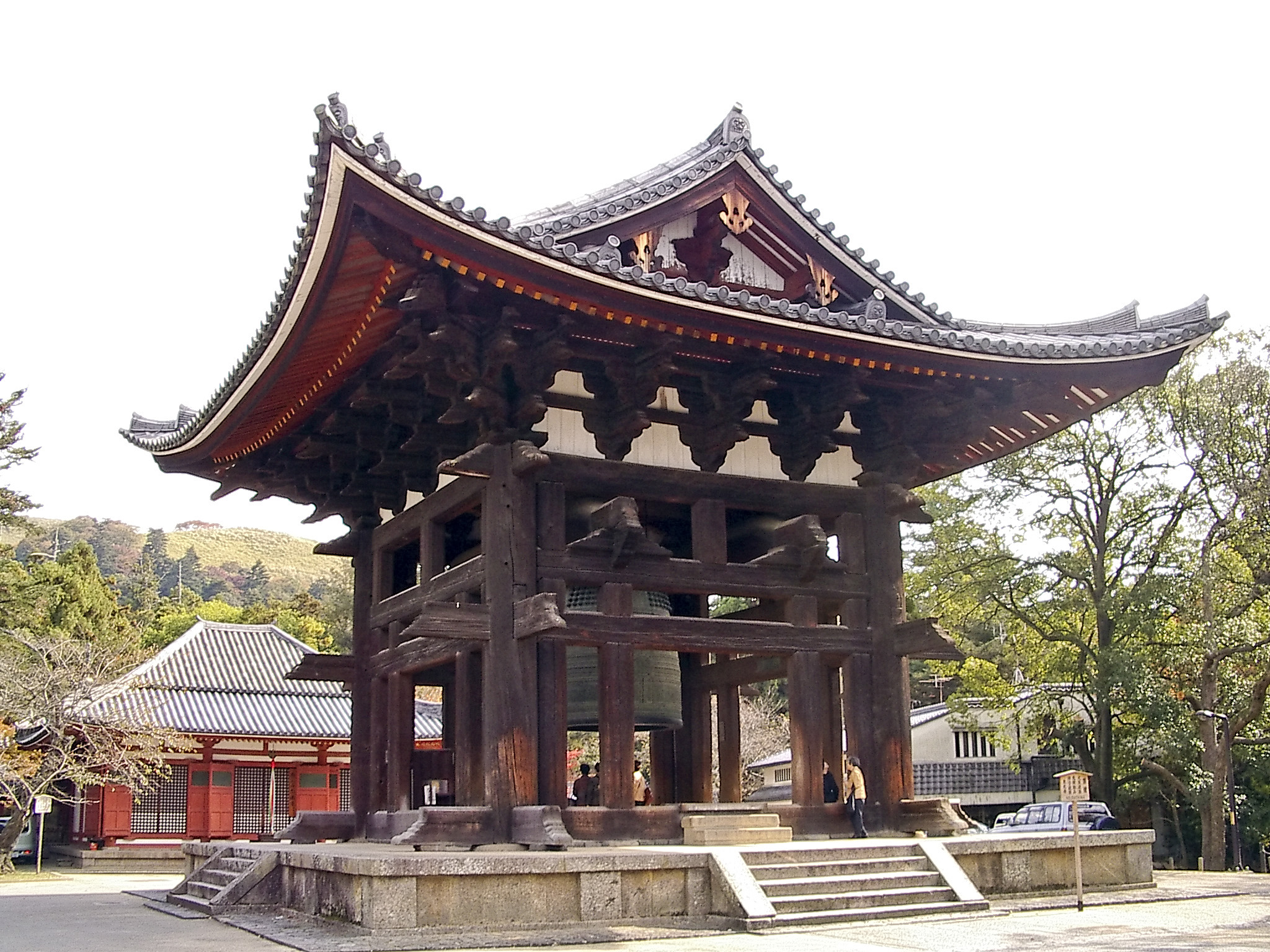
Tōdai-ji Temple Bell (Nara, Japan)

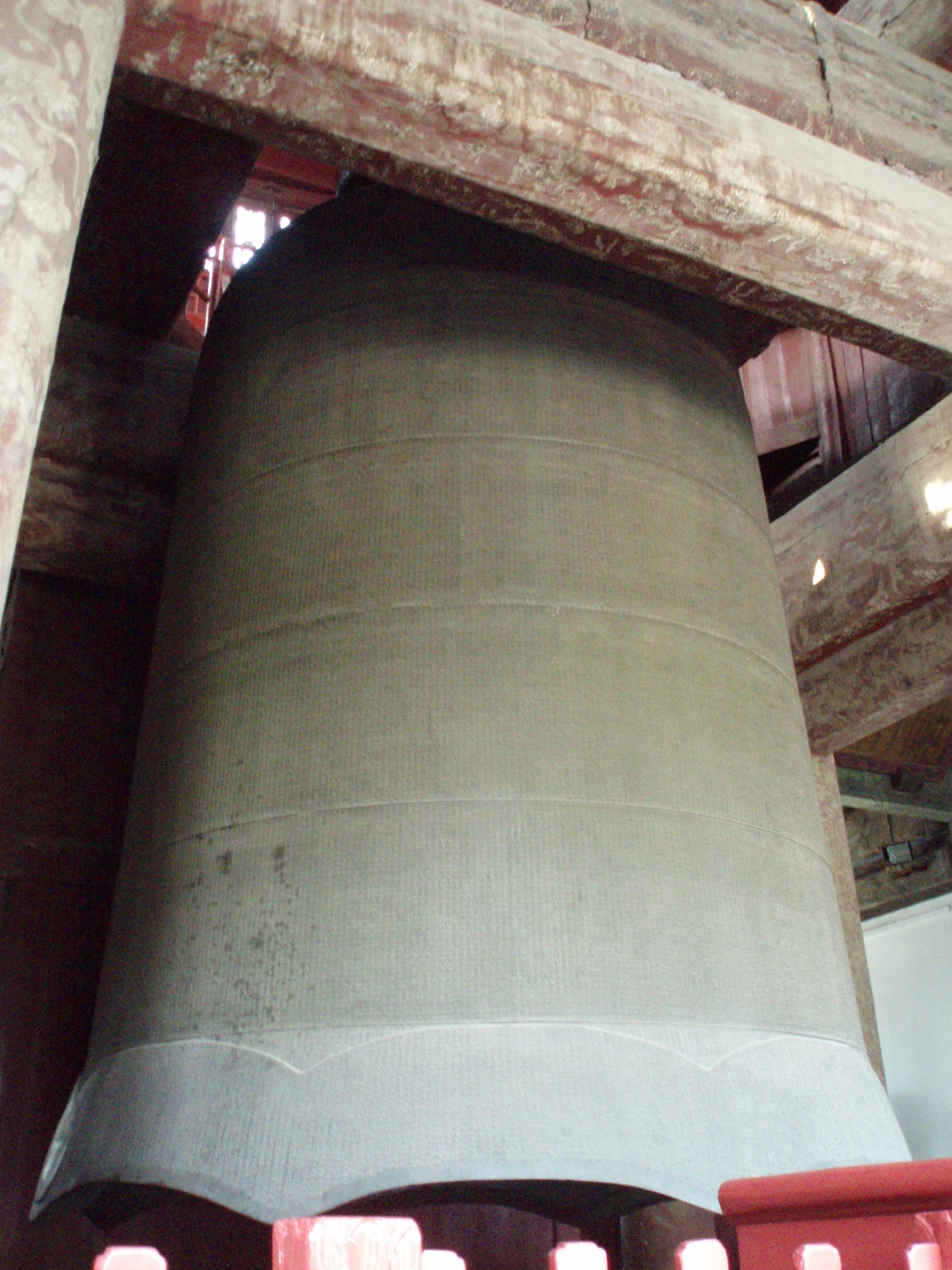
Yongle Bell (Beijing, China)

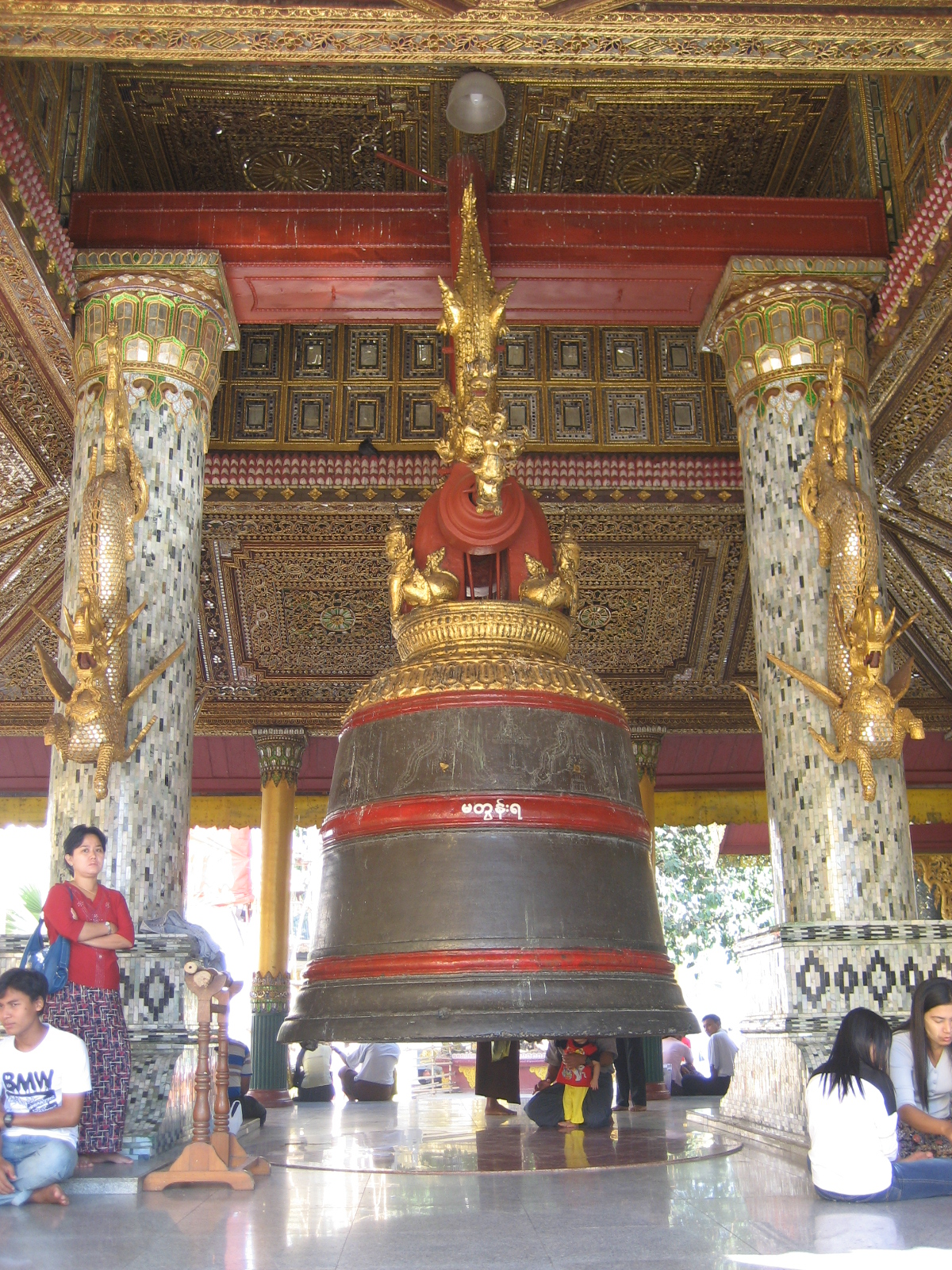
Tharrawaddy Min Bell (Yangon, Myanmar)

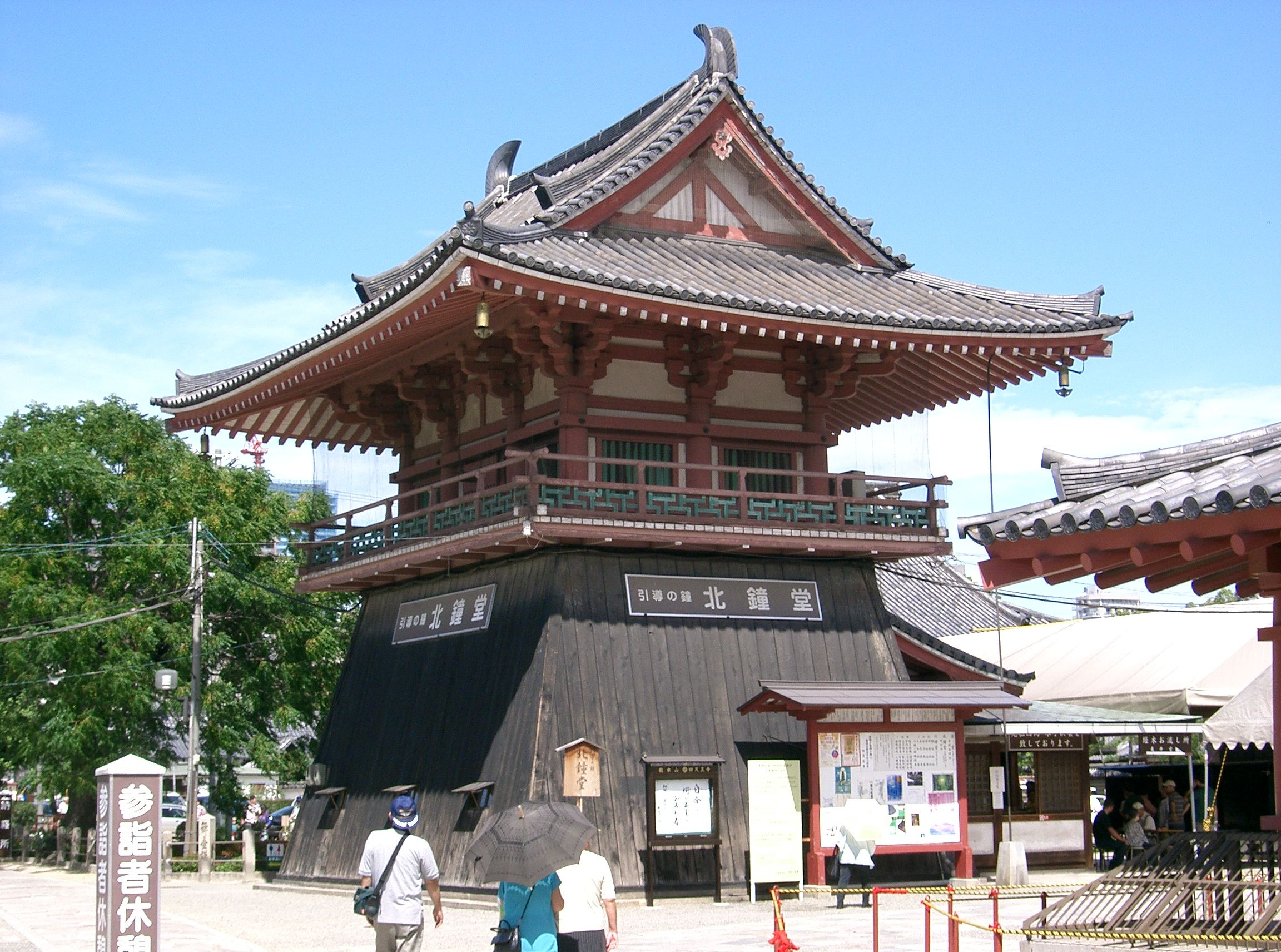
Shitennō-ji Temple Bell (Osaka, Japan)

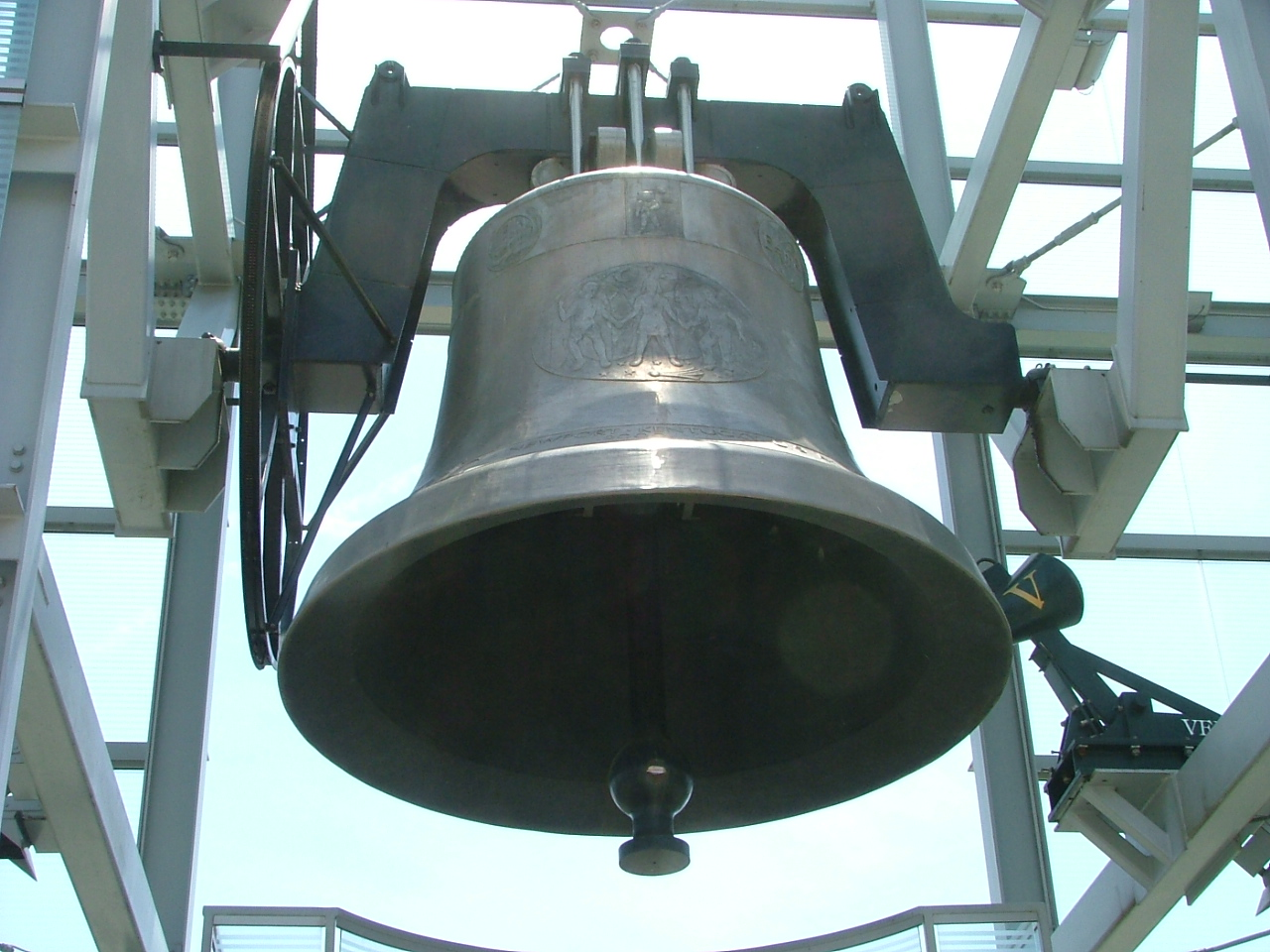
World Peace Bell (Newport, Kentucky, USA)

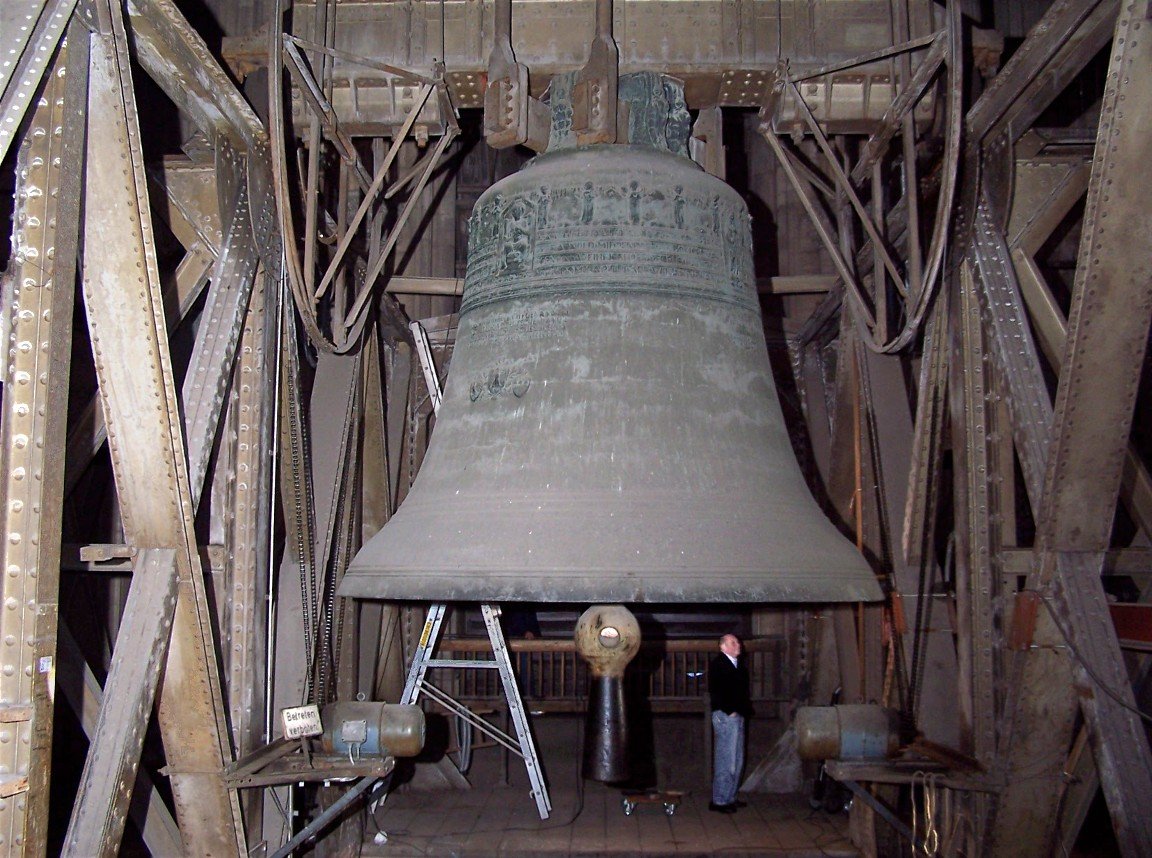
St. Petersglocke (Cologne, Germany)

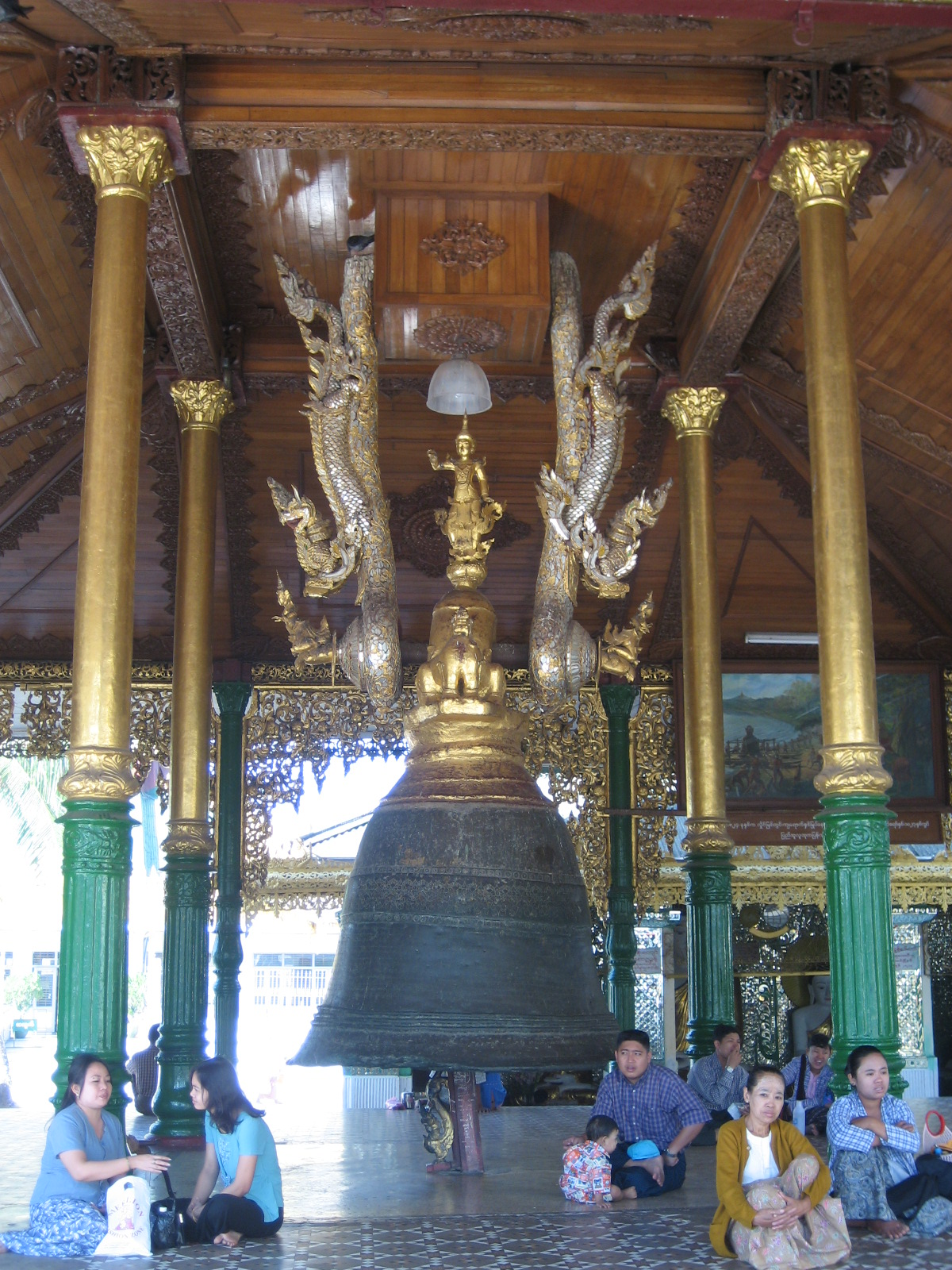
Maha Ganda Bell (Yangon, Myanmar)

== See also ==
- American Bell Association International
- Bellfounding
- Campanology
- Carillon
- Russian Orthodox bell ringing
