= Great Bell of Dhammazedi =

Bronze bell in modern-day Yangon, Myanmar

- ဓမ္မစေတီခေါင်းလောင်းကြီး
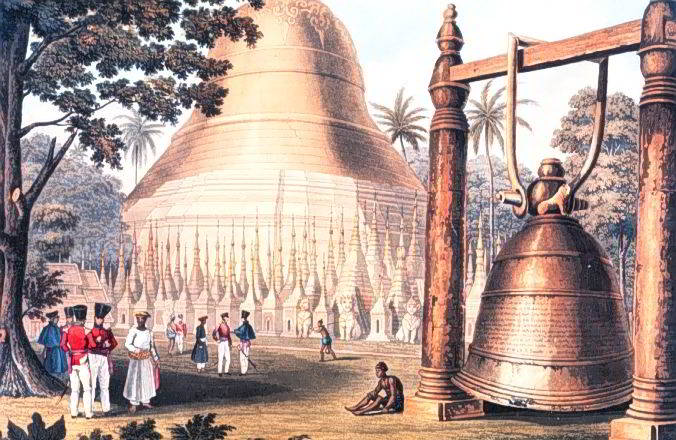
- A 19th-century depiction of the Great Bell of Dhammazedi at the Shwedagon Pagoda
- Location: Sunk beneath Yangon River
- Type: Temple bell
- Material: bronze
- Opening date: 5 February 1484
- Dedicated to: Shwedagon Pagoda

The Great Bell of Dhammazedi (Burmese: ဓမ္မစေတီခေါင်းလောင်းကြီး [dəma̰zèdì kʰáʊɰ̃láʊɰ̃ dʑí]) was a bronze bell, believed to be the largest bell ever cast. It was cast on 5 February 1484 by order of King Dhammazedi of Hanthawaddy Pegu, and presented to the Shwedagon Pagoda of Dagon (today's Yangon, Myanmar).

== Description ==
In 1484, King Dhammazedi's astrologer advised him to postpone the casting of the bell, because it was at the inauspicious time of the Crocodile constellation, and he predicted the bell would not produce any sound. After its completion, it reportedly had an unpleasant tone.

According to contemporary texts, the bell was cast from 180,000 viss (294 t) of metal which included silver and gold, as well as copper and tin. It was said to be twelve cubits high and eight cubits wide. In 1583, Gasparo Balbi, an Italian gem merchant, visited the Shwedagon Pagoda and described the King Dhammazedi Bell in his diary as being engraved from top to bottom with writing that he could not decipher:

"I found in a faire hall a very large bell which we measured, and found to be seven paces and three hand breadths and it is full of letters from the top to the bottom but there was no Nation that could understand them."

== Theft from Shwedagon Pagoda ==
European explorers and merchants began to make contacts in Lower Burma in the early 16th century. Filipe de Brito e Nicote, a Portuguese warlord and mercenary known as Nga Zinka to the Burmese, arrived in Lower Burma sometime in the 1590s. At that time, Syriam (now known as Thanlyin) was the most important seaport in the Burmese Kingdom of Taungoo.

In 1599, De Brito led an Arakanese force which sacked Syriam and Pegu (now known as Bago), the capital of Lower Burma. The King of Arakan appointed him as governor of Syriam. By 1600, De Brito had extended his power across the Bago River to Dagon and the surrounding countryside. De Brito declared independence from the Arakanese king in 1603 and established Portuguese rule under Aires de Saldanha, Viceroy of Portuguese India.

In 1608, De Brito and his men removed the Dhammazedi Bell from the Shwedagon Pagoda and rolled it down Singuttara Hill to a raft on the Pazundaung Creek. From here, the bell was hauled by elephants to the Bago River. The bell and raft were lashed to his flagship for the journey across the river to Syriam to be melted down and made into cannons. The load proved too heavy, and at the confluence of the Bago and Yangon Rivers, off what is now known as Monkey Point, the raft broke up and the bell went to the bottom, taking de Brito's ship with it.

Burmese forces under King Anaukpetlun re-captured Syriam in September 1613. De Brito was executed by impalement on a wooden stake.

== Current status ==
Many people have tried to find the bell, so far without success. Professional deep-sea diver James Blunt has made 115 exploratory dives, using sonar images of objects in the area for guidance. The search is complicated by the presence of at least three shipwrecks in the area. The water is muddy and visibility extremely poor. The bell could be buried in up to 25 feet (7.6 m) of mud and is thought to rest between the wrecks of two Dutch East Indiaman ships: Komine and Koning David, along with small pieces of De Brito's galleon.

In 2000, the Burmese government asked an English marine scientist named Mike Hatcher and his team to raise the bell so that it could be restored to the Pagoda. Hatcher agreed to manage the project, which is supported by Japanese, Australian and American companies. Richard Gere is involved in raising funds.

Initiating the project during a dictatorial regime has not been not without its opponents: Some pro-democracy campaigners say the salvage operation could be construed as an endorsement by the international community of Myanmar's military dictatorship, and should wait until talks with the regime have progressed or until such time as a democratic government is in place.

British explorer and commercial salvage diver Michael Hatcher's team intended to begin the first of seven salvage projects in March 2001, and determine the precise location of the bell. After a flurry of excitement stirred up by the BBC's announcement of the project, however, it apparently did not get off the ground, perhaps due to complications involved in his discovery in June 2000 of the Tek Sing in Indonesian waters, with the largest collection of porcelain ever found.

If the project ever does go forward, divers will likely use some combination of sub-bottom profilers, personal mounted sonar, night vision devices, and copper sulphate detectors (since the mud around the bronze bell would be expected to have a high concentration of copper sulphate). About nine months after the survey they expect to lift the bell from the river. To do this, they will have to build a small version of an oil platform in the muddy rapids of the confluence of the two rivers, and assemble a large crane to lift the bell. Once lifted, they will construct a railway to transport it uphill about half a mile to the Shwedagon Pagoda. This final operation will take about four months.

In July 2010, the Myanmar Times reported an Australian documentary filmmaker and explorer Damien Lay to be another foreigner who had decided to take up the project. Lay and his team conducted extensive side scan sonar surveys and diving operations, covering approximately four square kilometers of river floor in the area where the bell was thought to be located. Lay and his team identified and confirmed the presence of fourteen shipwrecks, identified two significant targets, and claimed to have acquired sonar imagery of both the bell and De Brito's galleon. The location of these targets has not been made public. He claimed both targets were well outside the area where the bell was previously thought to be. Lay stated that the myths and legends surrounding the location of the bell were not supported by his evidence and that the location of the bell had been significantly overlooked by a misinterpretation of history. "The location of the bell was quite surprising", he said.

Lay conducted the search as part of the Lady Southern Cross Search Expedition, an ongoing privately funded operation conducted over eight years. The search was a gesture to the people and Government of Myanmar in thanks for assistance and support in allowing Lay to search for and recover the wreckage of the Lady Southern Cross and the remains of Sir Charles Kingsford Smith and John Thompson "Tommy" Pethybridge, who disappeared off the coast of Myanmar on November 8, 1935.

Previous attempts to locate the bell by both domestic and foreign teams since 1987 either failed or did not materialize. Some other treasures from the Shwedagon, part of the original loot, are also believed to be present, and guarded by nat spirits. Some locals have claimed to have sighted the bell surfacing on a full moon night.

At the end of June 2012, the Historical Research Department of the Ministry of Culture and SD Mark International LLP Co of Singapore held a workshop in Yangon to organize a renewed attempt with the Singaporean firm pledging US$10 million for the non-profit project.

In August 2014, researcher San Linn claimed that the bell has been found and that preparations were being made for salvage. However, these claims were found to be false, and searches for the bell continue.

== See also ==
- Shwedagon Pagoda
- Singu Min Bell
- Tharrawaddy Min Bell
- List of heaviest bells
- Underwater archaeology
- The Long Ships (film), fictional search for a giant gold bell
