= Terentyev =

Terentyev (Russian: Тере́нтьев, also spelled Terentiev, Terentjev or Tsyarentsyew), or Terentyeva (feminine; Терентьева), is a Russian surname. Notable people with the surname include:

- Alyaksandr Tsyarentsyew (born 1981), a Belarusian footballer
- Denis Terentyev (born 1992), Russian football player
- Flor Terentyev (? - after 1700), a Russian bellmaker of the late 17th – early 18th century
- Fyodor Terentyev (1925–1963), a Soviet cross-country skier
- Kirill Terentyev (born 1979), Russian football player
- Maksim Terentyev (born 1992), Russian football player
- Nikolay Terentyev (born 1996), Russian sledge hockey player
- Nonna Terentyeva (1942–1996), a Soviet/Russian actress
- Sergey Terentyev (born 1964), a Russian musician and ex-member of Aria
