= Big Bell =

Big Bell may refer to:

- Big Bell, Western Australia, a ghost town in Western Australia
- Big Bell Gold Mine, a gold mine in Western Australia
- Big Bell Temple, a Buddhist temple located in Beijing, China
