= American Bell Association International =

The American Bell Association International, Inc. (ABA) is a nonprofit organization devoted to the collection, preservation, restoration, and research of bells in which members can attend regional chapter events and an annual national convention. Twenty-two U.S. chapters and an additional five international chapters are recognized by the American Bell Association International; global membership is 1,200 persons. The organization is one of over 100 names that uses the acronym ABA.

== History ==
The American Bell Association International started in 1940 as the National Bell Collector's Club by several women staying at the Chautauqua Institution in New York State, and the organization initiated a monthly printed publication, The Bell Tower, named in honor of the Miller Bell Tower at the institution. In 1989 The Bell Tower became a bi-monthly printed publication and has remained so since. Content of The Bell Tower is varied, ranging from miniature collectible bells to huge tower bells.

== Events ==
The first American Bell Association International annual convention took place in Chicago, Illinois, in 1946. The fifth annual convention was held in New York City and featured in The New Yorker, which covered one of the American Bell Association International's founders, Mary A. Collins, and Bells of Sarna by the founder of present day company S.S. Sarna. The most recent (2015) annual convention will be held in Kansas City, MO. The annual convention is held in a different state each year. Chapters of the American Bell Association International have various meeting schedules and convene two or more times per year. Chapter meetings generally include five main components. A social phase allows members to meet and converse. Presentations allow members and/or experts to disseminate information about a focus or discipline regarding bells and may take such forms as digital and/or oral lectures. A business discussion phase addresses chapter goals and achievements. A display period allows members to provide viewings of items from their bell collections, and an exchange period presents members the opportunity to buy, sell, and/or trade items.

== See also ==
- Bell of King Seongdeok
- Bellfounding
- Bianzhong
- Campanology
- Carillon
- Change ringing
- Glockenmuseum Stiftskirche Herrenberg
- Jingle bell
- Liberty Bell
- List of heaviest bells
- Russian Orthodox bell ringing
- Ship's bell
- Tsar Bell

== Notes ==
American Bell Association International members include(d) authors of books on travel to find bells, collecting bells as a hobby, bells as culturally significant instruments, and campanology. The American Bell Association International is recommended by the Smithsonian Institution as the source from which public inquiries may obtain information about bells. The symbol of The American Bell Association International is a bell reported by the donor (the organization’s 14th president) to have belonged to Ulysses S. Grant.
