= Mingun Bell =

Bell located in Mingun, Sagaing Region, Myanmar

- မင်းကွန်း ခေါင်းလောင်းတော်ကြီး
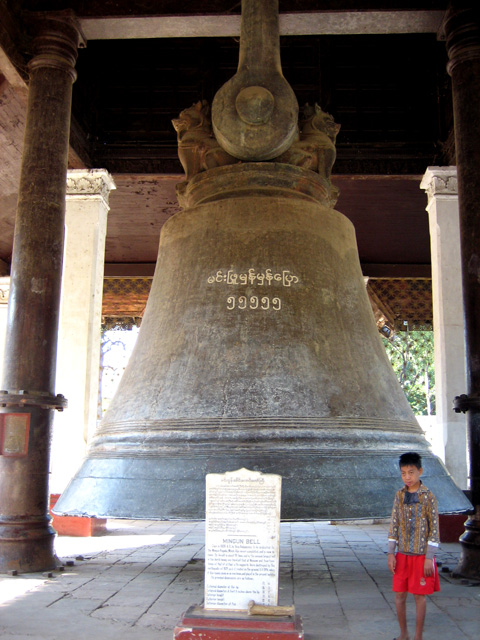
- Interactive map of Mingun Bell
- Location: Mingun, Sagaing Region
- Coordinates: 22.052972°N 96.017778°E
- Type: Temple Bell
- Material: bronze 90,718 kg
- Beginning date: 1808
- Completion date: 1810
- Dedicated to: Mingun Pagoda

The Mingun Bell (မင်းကွန်းခေါင်းလောင်းတော်ကြီး [mɪ́ɰ̃ɡʊ́ɰ̃ kʰáʊɰ̃láʊɰ̃ dɔ̀ dʑí]) is a bell located in Mingun, Sagaing Region, Myanmar. It is located approximately 11 km (6.8 mi) north of Mandalay on the western bank of the Irrawaddy River. It was the heaviest functioning bell in the world at several times in history. The Mingun Bell was built on the orders of Burmese King Bodawpaya (r. 1782–1819) and was cast in bronze in 1808 as part of his massive temple complex project in Mingun, Myanmar. Bodawpaya sought to create the world's largest ringing bell, commissioning it with an alloy of gold, silver, bronze, iron, and lead, weighing over 90 metric tons (55,555 viss).

== Description ==
The weight of the bell is 55,555 viss (90,718 kilograms or 199,999 pounds). This number is conveniently remembered by many people in Myanmar as a mnemonic "Min Hpyu Hman Hman Pyaw" (မင်းဖြူမှန်မှန်ပြော), with the consonants representing the number 5 in Burmese astronomy and numerology. The weight of the bell and its mnemonic words are written on the surface of the bell in white.

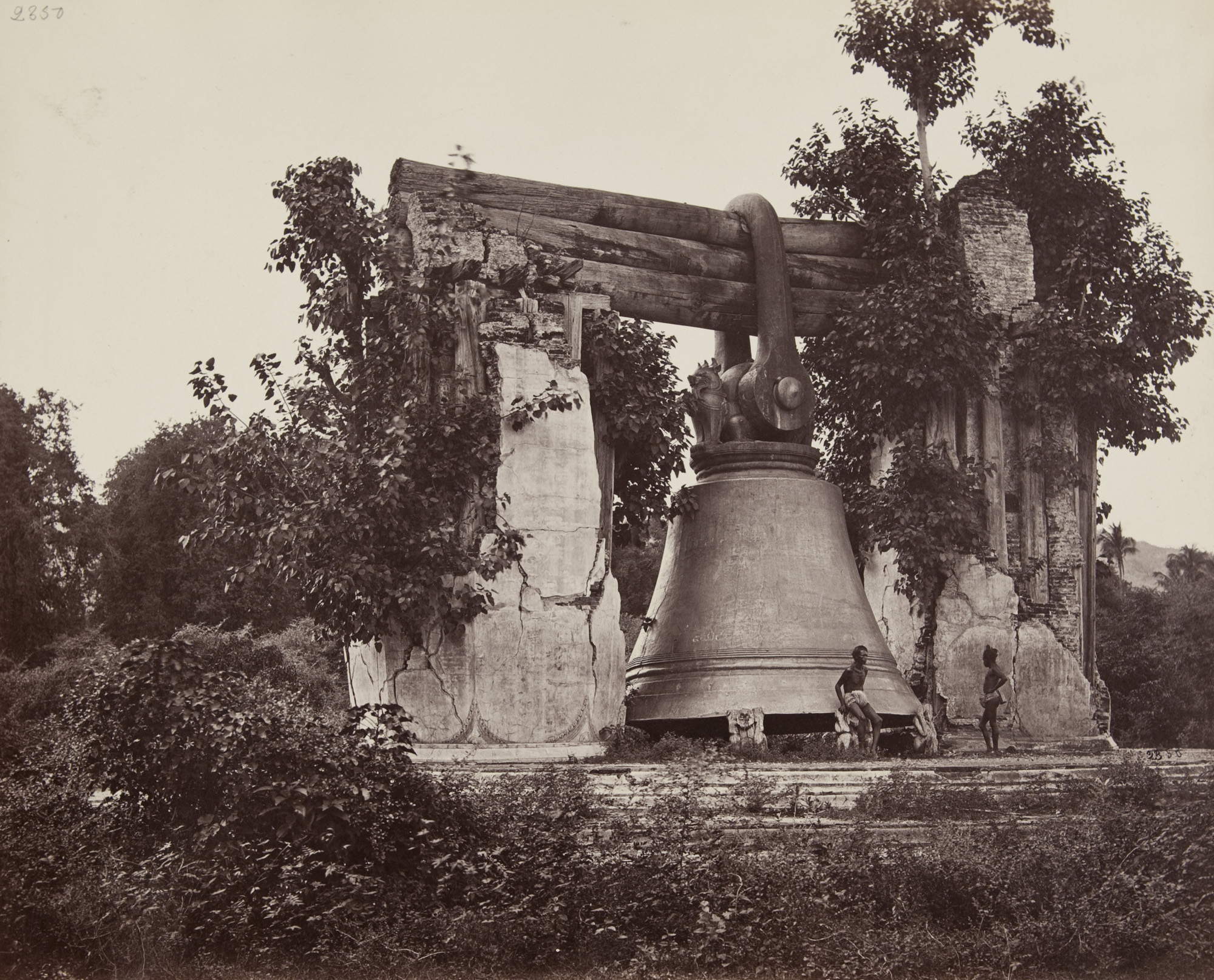
Mingun Bell in 1873, on rim supports

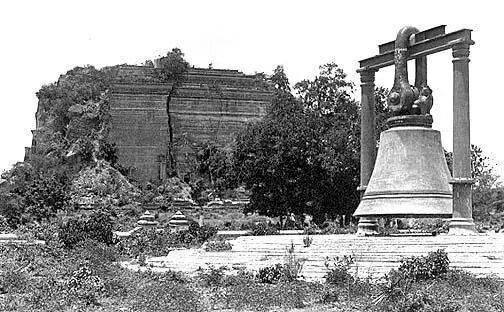
Mingun Bell in 1896, resuspended

The outer diameter of the rim of the bell is 16 feet 3 inches (4.95 m). The height of the bell is 12.0 feet (3.66 m) on the exterior and 11.5 feet (3.51 m) in the interior. The outside circumference at the rim is 50.75 feet (15.469 m). The bell is 6 to 12 inches (15–30 cm) thick and stands 20.7 feet (6.31 m) high from the rim to the top.

The bell is uncracked and in good ringing condition. The bell does not have a clapper but is rung by striking the outer edge.

== History ==
Casting of the bell started in 1808 and was finished by 1810. King Bodawpaya (r. 1782–1819) had this gigantic bell cast to go with his huge stupa, Mingun Pahtodawgyi. The bell was said to have been cast on the opposite side of the river and was transported by using two boats, which after crossing the river, proceeded up two specially built canals. The canals were then dammed and the bell was lifted by raising the water level by the addition of earth into the blocked canal. In this way the bell was originally suspended.

The Mingun Bell was knocked off its supports as a result of a large earthquake on 23 March 1839. It was resuspended by the Irrawaddy Flotilla Company in March 1896 using screw jacks and levers using funds from public subscription. Felice Beato captured a photograph of the bell prior to its resuspension.

== Current status ==
At 90 tons, the Mingun Bell reigned as the largest ringing bell in the world until 2000, when it was eclipsed by the 116-ton Bell of Good Luck at the Foquan Temple, Pingdingshan, Henan, China.

== Gallery ==
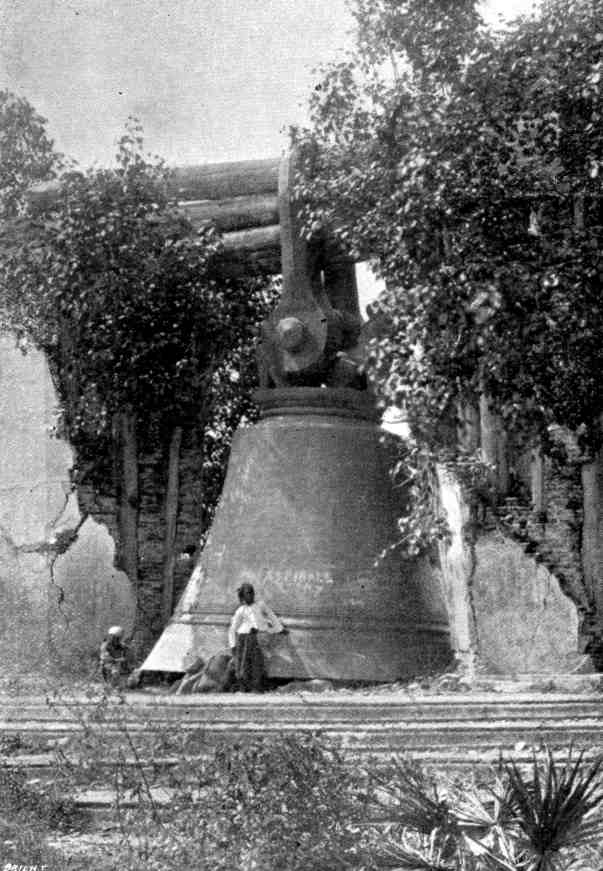
Before 1896 – a picture by Felice Beato

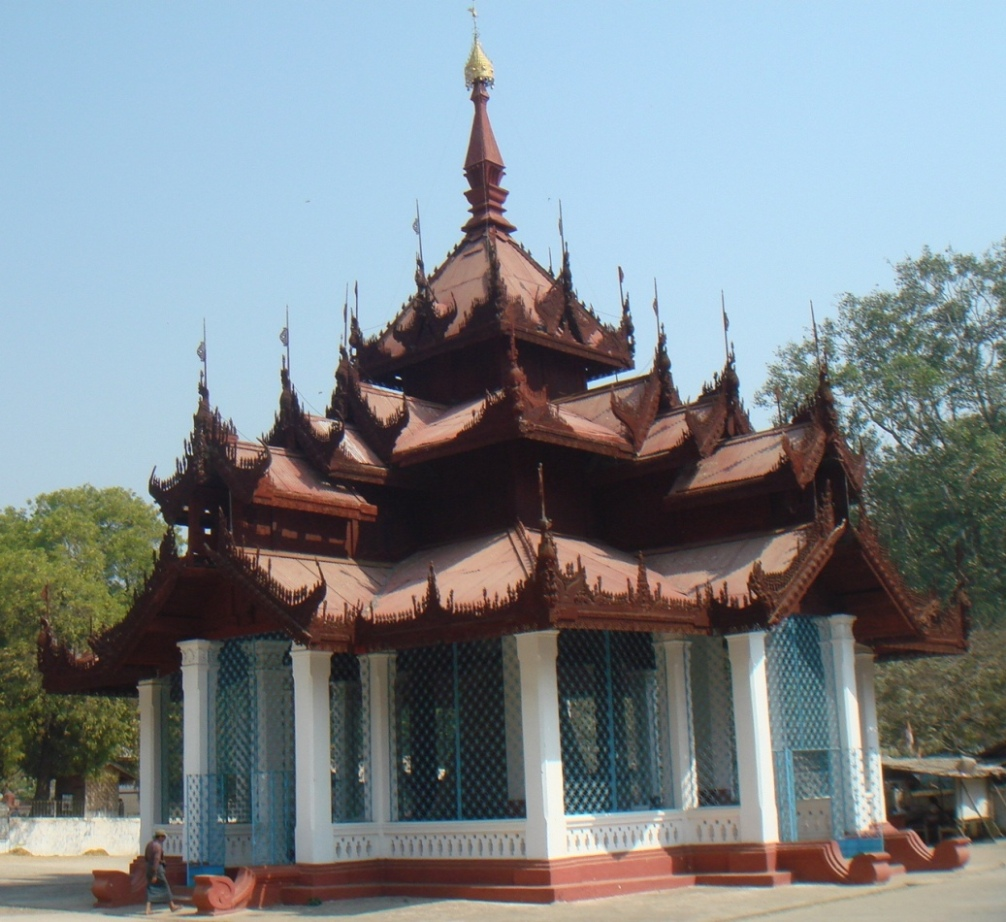
Zayat which houses the Mingun Bell

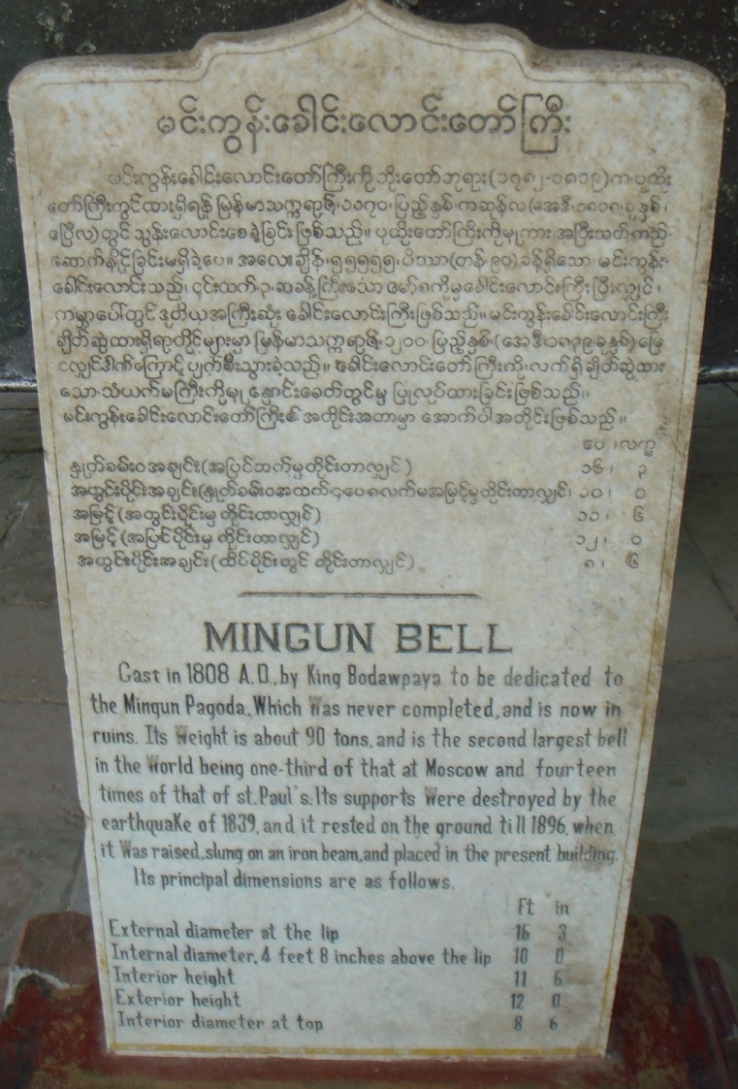
Plaque in front of the Mingun Bell

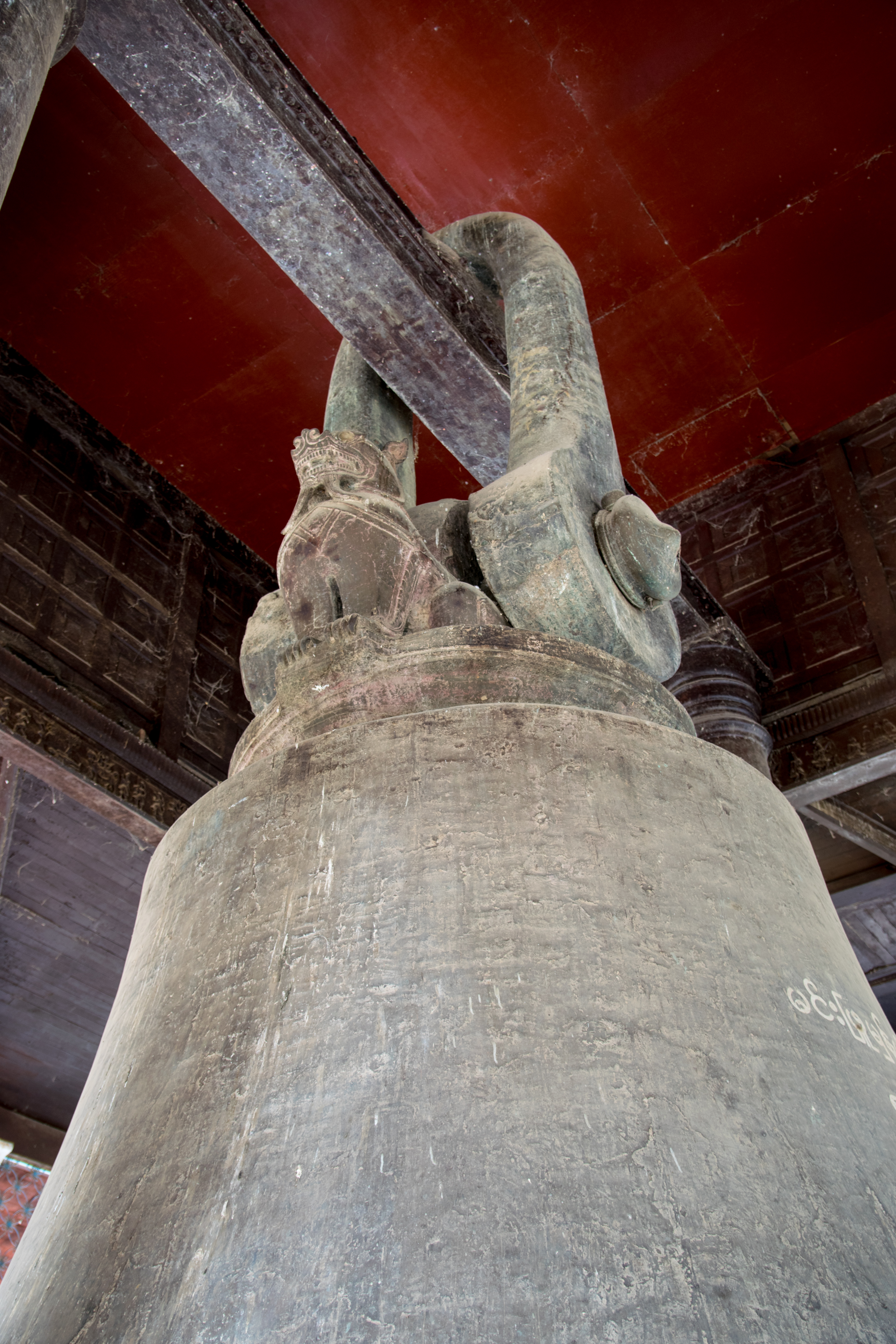
Suspension of the Mingun Bell

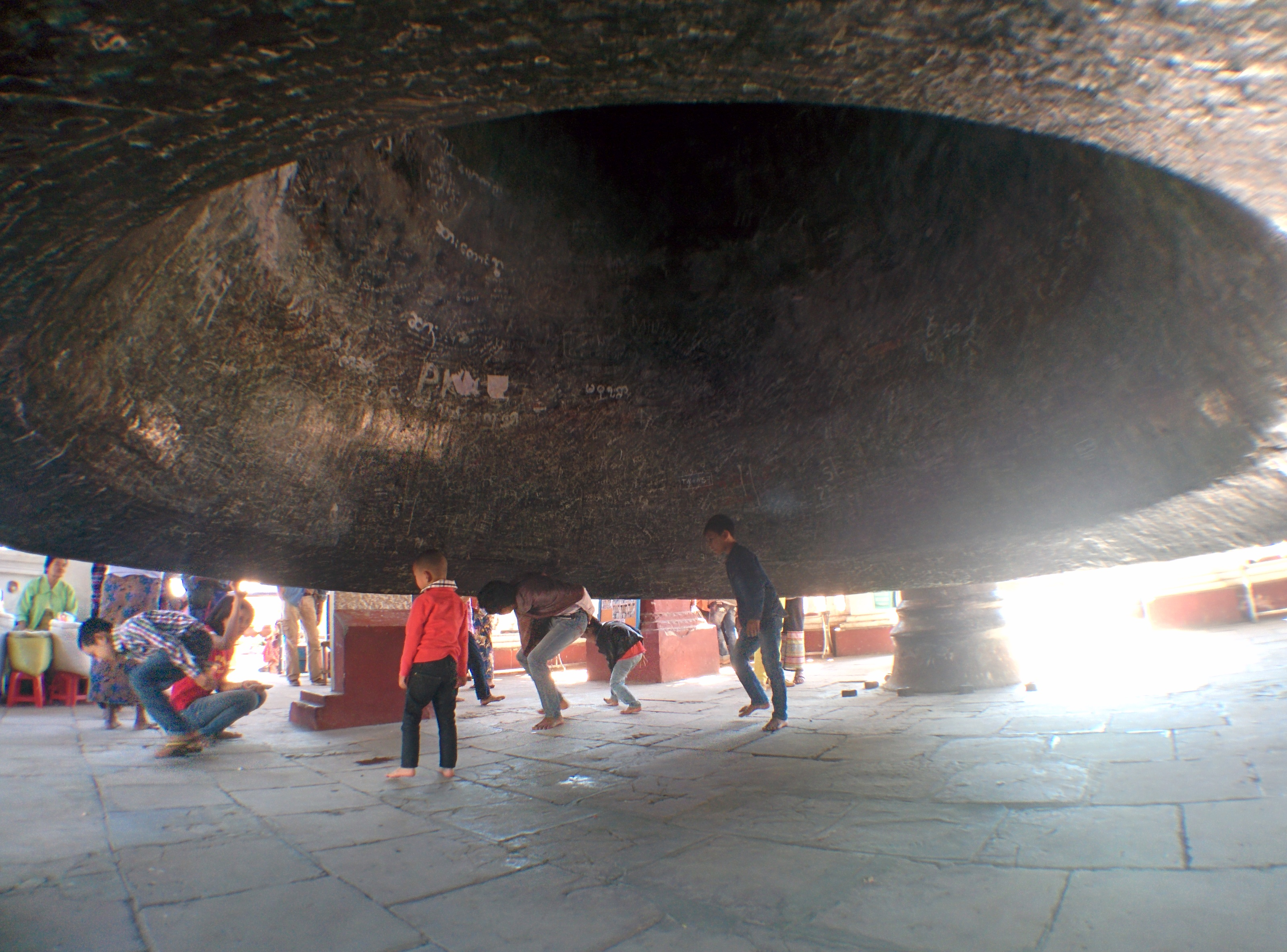
Children under Mingun Bell, showing graffiti as of December 2014

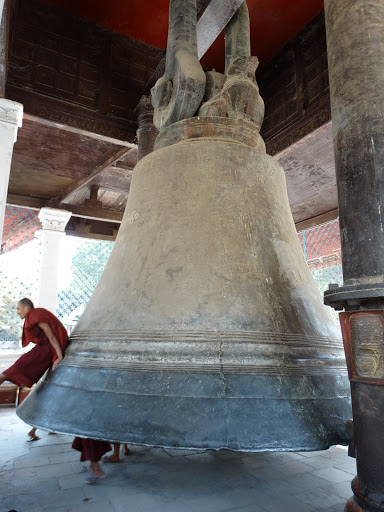
Mingun Bell 2016

== See also ==
- List of heaviest bells
