= Tsar Bell =

World's heaviest bell, cast in 1735

- Царь–колокол
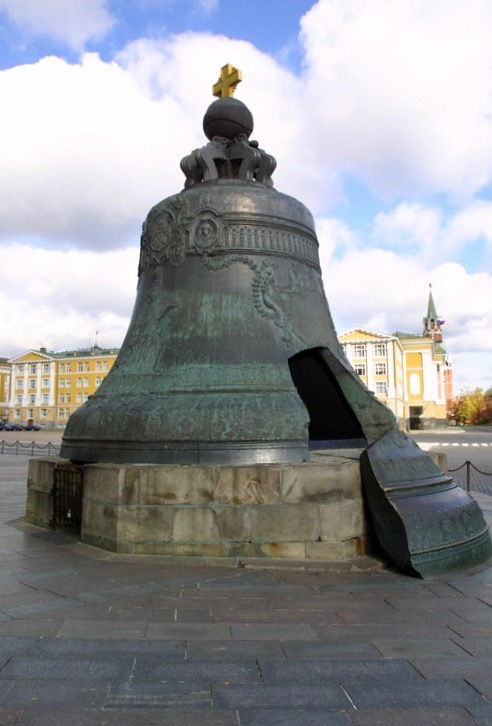
- Interactive map of Tsar Bell
- Location: Moscow, Russia
- Coordinates: 55°45′03″N 37°37′06″E
- Designer: Ivan Motorin
- Type: Tower Bell
- Material: Bell bronze
- Width: 6.6 metres (22 ft)
- Height: 6.14 metres (20.1 ft)
- Beginning date: 1733
- Completion date: 1735

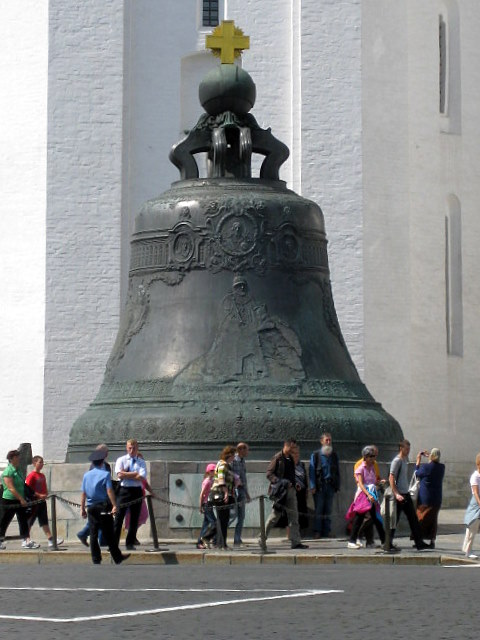
The Tsar Bell with humans for perspective – broken piece is around the left, out of view

The Tsar Bell (Russian: Царь–колокол; Tsar'-kolokol), also known as the Tsarsky Kolokol, Tsar Kolokol III, or Royal Bell, is a 6.14-metre-tall (20.1 ft), 6.6-metre-diameter (22 ft) bell on display on the grounds of the Moscow Kremlin. The bell was commissioned by Empress Anna Ivanovna, niece of Peter the Great.

It has never been in working order, suspended, nor rung.

The present bell is sometimes referred to as Kolokol III (Bell III), because it is the third generation.

== General description ==
The Tsar Bell is located between the Ivan the Great Bell Tower and the Kremlin Wall. Made of bell bronze, the bell cracked during a fire after being completed and has never been rung. The bell is the largest bell in the world, weighing 201,924 kilograms (445,166 lb), with a height of 6.14 metres (20.1 ft) and diameter of 6.6 metres (22 ft), and thickness of up to 61 centimetres (24 in). The broken piece weighs 11,500 kilograms (25,400 lb). (Note: At 116 metric tons, the Bell of Good Luck in Foquan Temple, Pingdingshan, Henan, China is the heaviest functioning bell in the world.)

The bell is decorated with relief images of baroque angels, plants, oval medallions with saints, and nearly life-size images of Empress Anna and Tsar Alexei, who was reigning at the time the previous Tsar Bell was cast.

== History ==
The history of Russian bell founding goes back to the 10th century, but in the medieval Russian Orthodox Church, bells were not typically rung to indicate church services, but to announce important ceremonies and celebrations, and as an alarm in case of fire or enemy attack. One of the largest of the early bells was the original Tsar Bell, cast in the 16th century. Completed in 1600, it weighed 18,000 kilograms (40,000 lb) and required 24 men to ring its clapper. Housed in the original wooden Ivan the Great Bell Tower in the Moscow Kremlin, it crashed to the ground in a fire in the mid-17th century and was broken to pieces.

The second Tsar Bell was cast in 1655, using the remnants of the former bell, but on a much larger scale. This bell weighed 100,000 kilograms (220,000 lb), but was again destroyed by fire in 1701.

After becoming Empress, Anna ordered that the pieces be cast into a new bell with its weight increased by another hundred tons, and dispatched the son of Field Marshal Münnich to Paris to solicit technical help from the master craftsmen there. However, a bell of such size was unprecedented, and Münnich was not taken seriously. In 1733, the job was assigned to local foundry masters, Ivan Motorin and his son Mikhail, based on their experience in casting a bronze cannon.

A pit 10 metres (33 ft) deep was dug (near the location of the present bell), with a clay form, and walls reinforced with rammed earth to withstand the pressure of the molten metal. Obtaining the necessary metals proved a challenge, for in addition to the parts of the old bell, an additional 525 kilograms (1,157 lb) of silver and 72 kilograms (159 lb) of gold were added to the mixture. After months of preparation, casting work commenced at the end of November 1734. The first attempt was not successful, and the project was incomplete when Ivan Motorin died in August, 1735. His son Mikhail carried on the work, and the second attempt at casting succeeded on November 25, 1735. Ornaments were added as the bell was cooling while raised above the casting pit through 1737.

However, before the last ornamentation was completed, a major fire broke out at the Kremlin on 29 May 1737. The fire spread to the temporary wooden support structure for the bell, and fearing damage, guards threw cold water on it, causing eleven cracks, and a huge 10,432.6 kilograms (23,000 lb) slab to break off. The fire burned through the wooden supports, and the damaged bell fell back into its casting pit. The Tsar Bell remained in its pit for almost a century. Unsuccessful attempts to raise it were made in 1792 and 1819. Napoleon, during his occupation of Moscow in 1812, considered removing it as a trophy to France, but was unable to do so, due to its size and weight.

It was finally successfully raised in the summer of 1836 by the French architect Auguste de Montferrand and placed on a stone pedestal. The broken slab alone is nearly three times larger than the world's largest bell hung for full circle ringing, the tenor bell at Liverpool Cathedral.

For a time, the bell served as a chapel, with the broken area forming the door.

Voltaire once joked that the Kremlin's two greatest items were a bell which was never rung and a cannon (the Tsar Pushka) that was never fired.

== Bell diagnostics ==
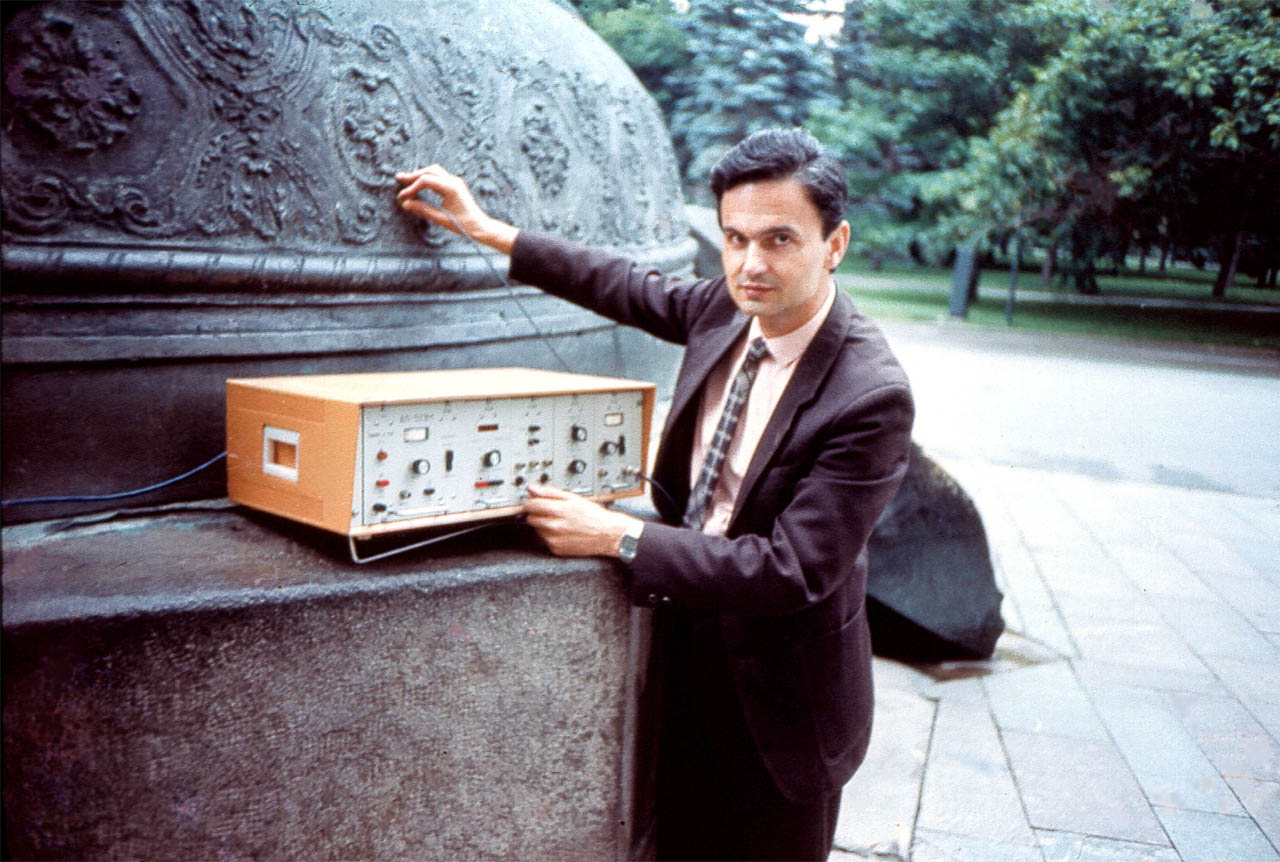
Monitoring of cracks of the Tsar-bell by AE device. 1986

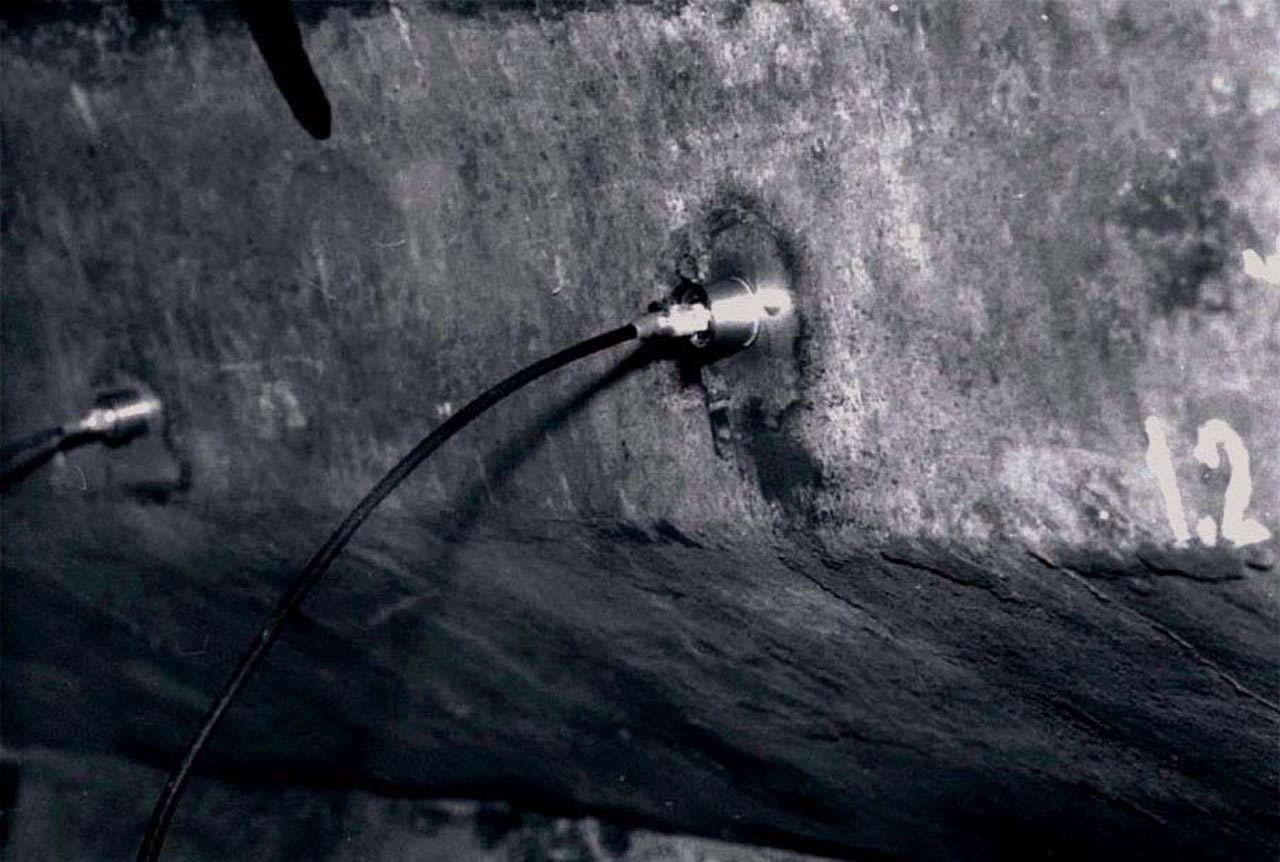
AE sensors inside the Tsar Bell. 1986

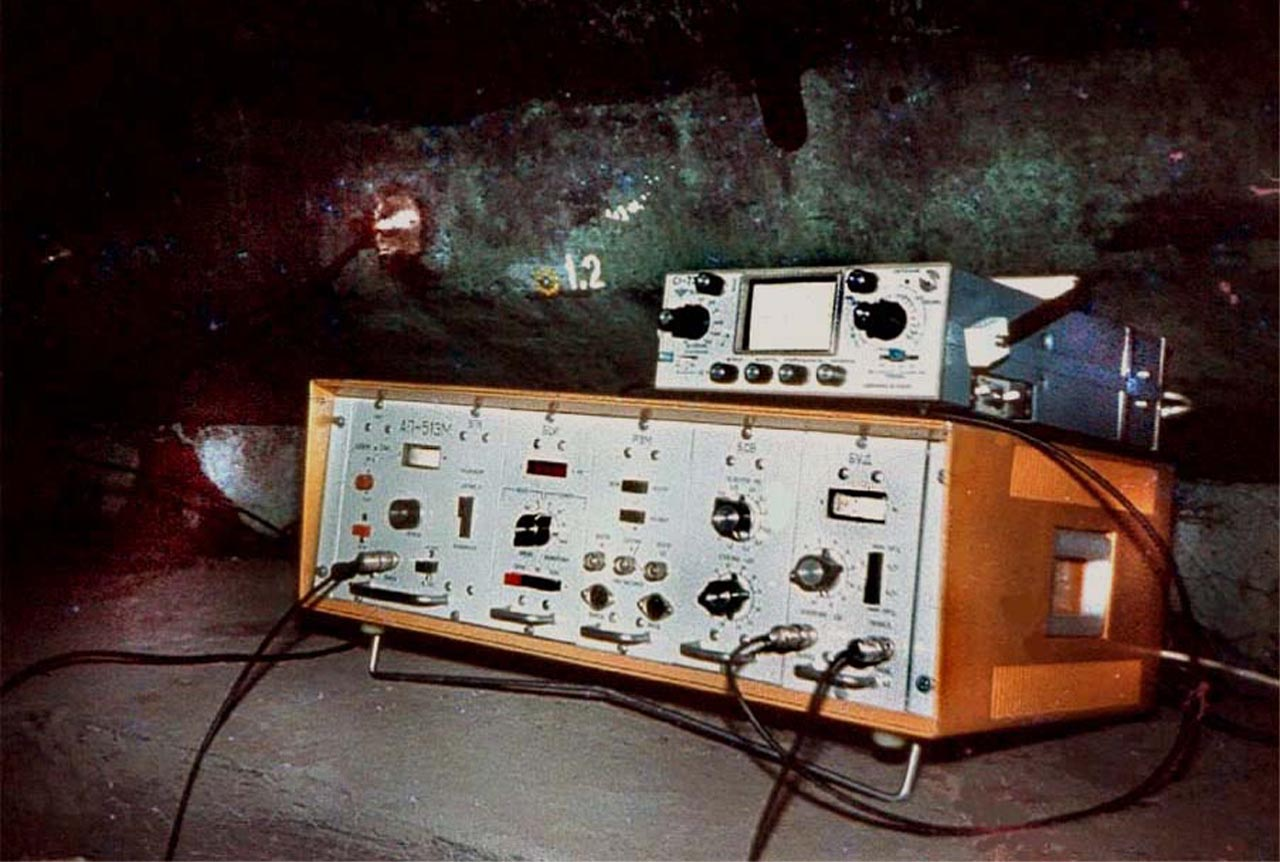
AE diagnostics of the Tsar-bell. 1986

In the mid-1980s, some deformation of the pedestal was noticed, as a result of which there were concerns about the possible growth of cracks in the bell. At the request of the Minister of Culture of the USSR and in accordance with the instructions of the Minister of Defense of the USSR, the Military Academy named after F. E. Dzerzhinsky (now Peter the Great Military Academy of the Strategic Missile Forces) was commissioned in 1986 to carry out a complex of works on the restoration and preservation of the Tsar Bell. The actual condition of its cracks was assessed using the acoustic emission (AE) method. To conduct the AE diagnostics of the bell, employees of the Research Institute of Mechanics and Applied Mathematics of Rostov State University were involved under the guidance of the head of the AE laboratory, Ph.D. S. I. Builo. On behalf of the F. E. Dzerzhinsky Academy, these works were provided by Colonel, Ph.D. A. I. Gnevko. Diagnostics of the Tsar Bell was carried out in two stages using an in-house hardware AE complex brought from Rostov-on-Don.

At the first stage, the parameters and features of the AE radiation of the bell material were investigated. This part of the work was carried out on the territory of the F. E. Dzerzhinsky Academy when testing specially made large-sized (more than 10 cm thick and weighing about 100 kg) samples made of a bronze alloy identical to the bell material. At the second stage, acoustic calibration and diagnostics of the Tsar Bell itself were carried out on the territory of the Kremlin. The work on the bell consisted, if we do without scientific terms, as if in "listening" to it for the presence of ultrasonic radiation of growing cracks. It was found that the condition of the Tsar Bell at the time of diagnosis is satisfactory, and in the near future it is not in danger of catastrophic destruction.

To further monitor the condition of the bell cracks, Rostov residents were asked to make a multi-channel AE diagnostic system with the installation of a separate sensor at the top of each of the large cracks. However, for the permanent installation of AE receiving sensors on the bell, it was necessary to coordinate many different issues. For example, it was necessary to prove that a constantly working system listening to the bell would not be able to listen to anything else "wrong" around and so on. However, as a result of restructuring during Perestroika, further assessment of the bell was deprioritized; the discussion and coordination of issues surrounding its preservation have since been delayed.

Judging by some external signs, a slight deformation of the bell still continues. The "tradition" of pushing metal coins into the cracks of the bell is also alarming. And if earlier small coins had a composition close to the bell material, then the current ones are made of completely different metals, which in the presence of moisture can cause noticeable electrochemical corrosion of the material inside the cracks. For a reliable assessment of the condition of the Tsar Bell in the future, it is necessary to periodically conduct a procedure for diagnosing the possible growth of cracks in its walls by non-destructive testing methods.

== Computational simulation of sound ==
In the spring of 2016, a team of University of California, Berkeley; Stanford University; and University of Michigan researchers publicly performed an electronic reproduction of how the Tsar Bell would sound if it had not been damaged during casting. To simulate the sound of the bell, the team researched the bell's material characteristics and constructed a polygon mesh that modeled the shape of the bell. The team then used finite element analysis to compute the component frequencies of the bell when rung. For the first public performance, a stack of twelve speakers installed below the campanile on the UC Berkeley campus played the digital simulation of the Tsar Bell. The fundamental frequency of the sound was approximately 81 Hz. The American disk jockey DJ Spooky composed New Forms (2016), a duet for carillon and the reproduction of the Tsar Bell.

== See also ==
- Russian Orthodox bell ringing
- The Liberty Bell, a damaged colonial American bell cast two decades later
- List of heaviest bells
