= Tharrawaddy Min Bell =

42-ton bronze bell

Coordinates: 16°47′54″N 96°8′58″E

- သာယာဝတီမင်း ခေါင်းလောင်းတော်
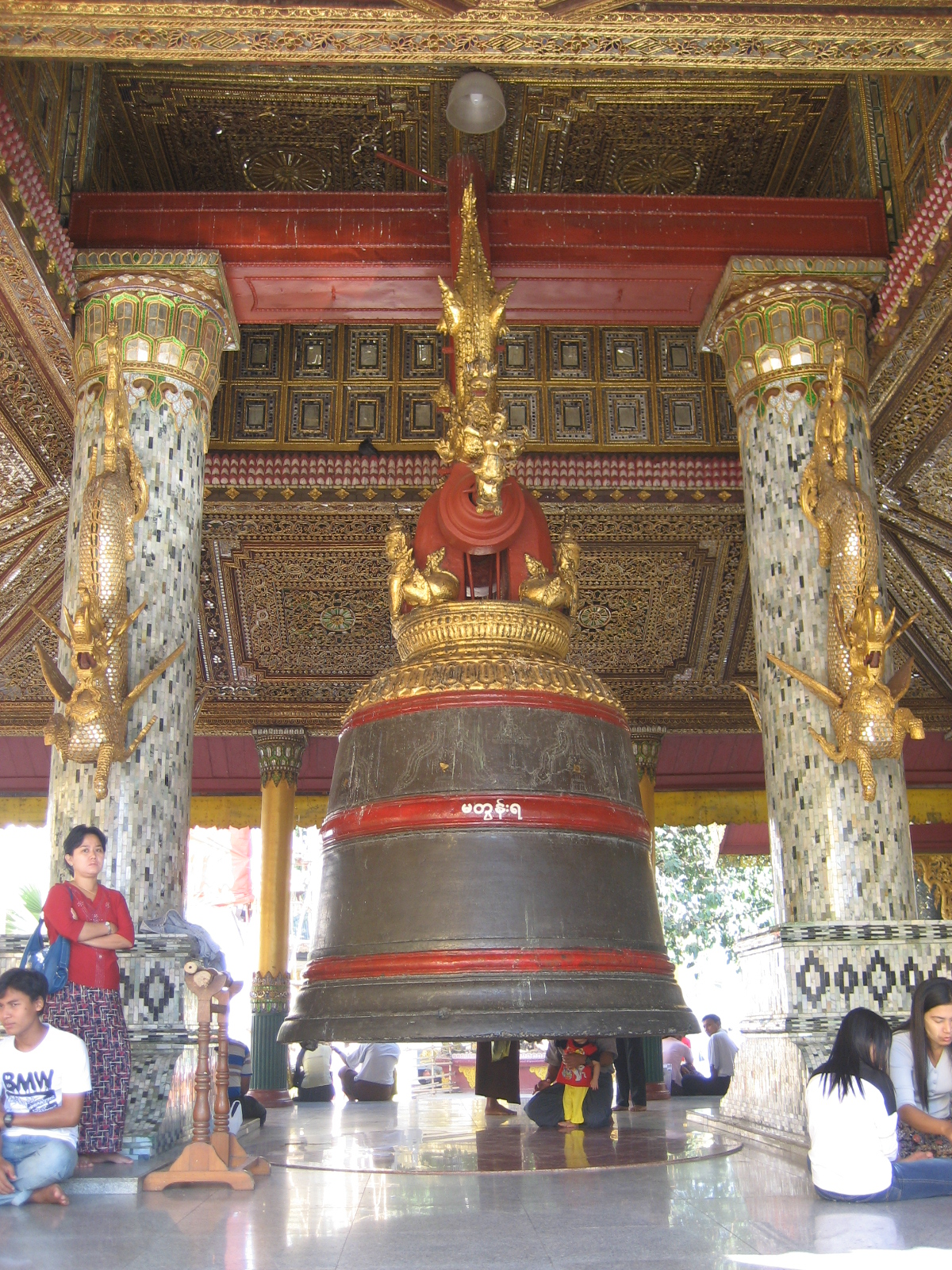
- Interactive map of Tharrawaddy Min Bell
- Location: Shwedagon Pagoda, Yangon, Myanmar (Burma)
- Designer: Maha Sithu and Maha Min Kyaw Thinkhaya
- Type: Temple Bell
- Material: bronze 42,000 kg
- Beginning date: 20 January 1842
- Dedicated to: Shwedagon Pagoda

The Tharrawaddy Min Bell (Burmese: သာယာဝတီမင်း ခေါင်းလောင်းတော်), also known as the Maha Tissada Gandha Bell, is a large bell located at the Shwedagon Pagoda in Yangon, Myanmar (Burma). It was donated in 1841 by King Tharrawaddy, of Konbaung Dynasty. The official Pali name of the bell is Maha Tissada Gandha, which means "Great Three-toned Sweet Sound".

== History ==
On 24 September 1841 (10th waxing of Thadingyut 1203 ME), King Tharrawaddy commissioned a 42-ton bell called the Maha Tissada Gandha ("great three-toned sweet sound") Bell and 20 kilograms (44 lbs) of gold plating to the Shwedagon Pagoda in Yangon. The king appointed two ministers Maha Sithu and Maha Min Kyaw Thinkhaya to oversee the casting project, which began on 20 January 1842 (10th waxing of Tabodwe 1203 ME).

== Current status ==
The bell is housed in a pavilion, located on the northeast side of the pagoda's middle terrace.

== See also ==
- List of heaviest bells
