= Singu Min Bell =

Coordinates: 16°47′54″N 96°8′58″E

- စဉ့်ကူးမင်း ခေါင်းလောင်းတော်
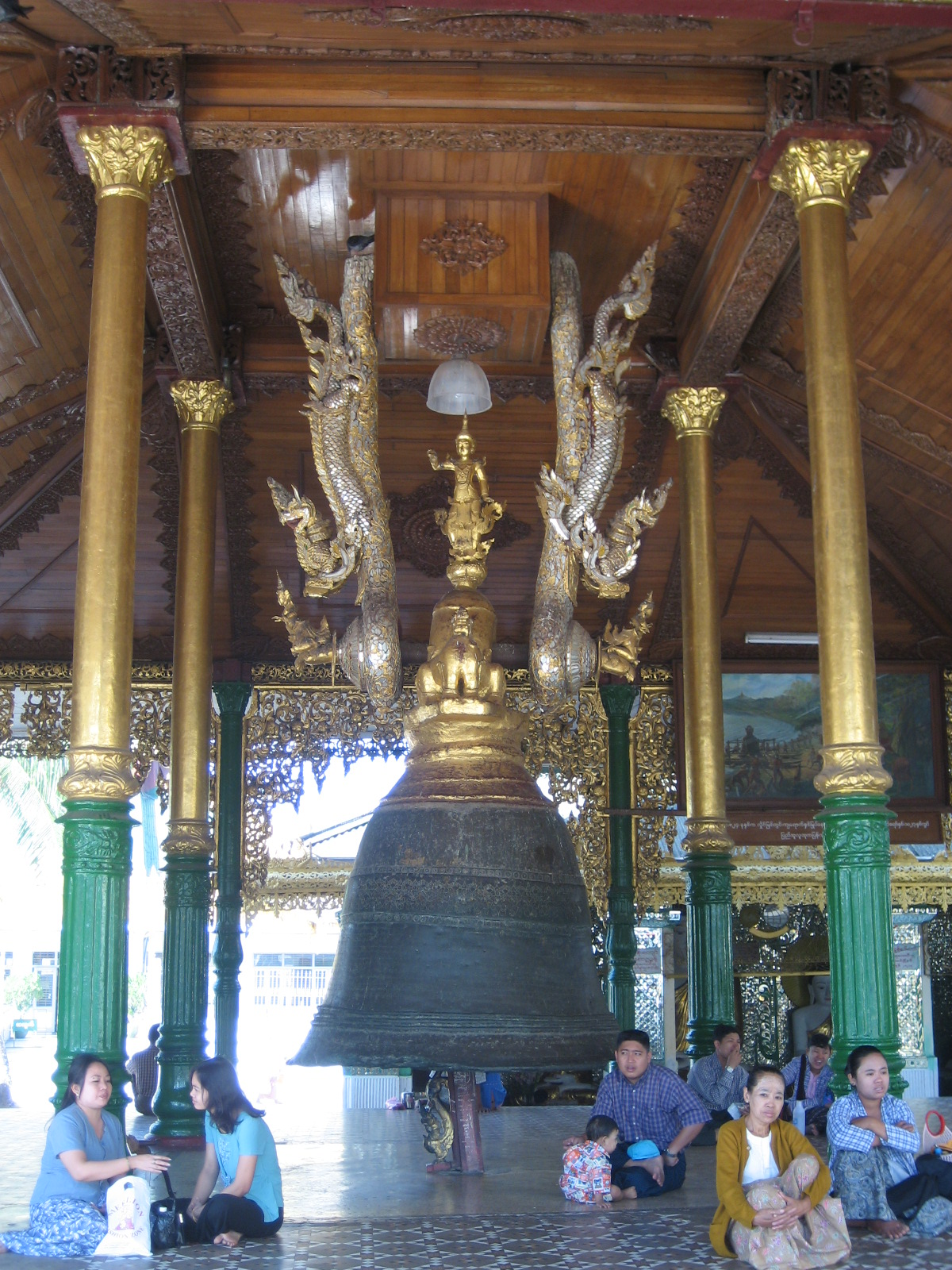
- Interactive map of Singu Min Bell
- Location: Shwedagon Pagoda, Yangon, Myanmar (Burma)
- Type: Temple Bell
- Material: bronze 23,000-25,000 kg
- Width: 2.01 metres (6.6 ft)
- Height: 2.13 metres (7.0 ft)
- Beginning date: c. 1776
- Completion date: 1779
- Opening date: 17 January 1779
- Dedicated to: Shwedagon Pagoda

The Singu Min Bell (Burmese: စဉ့်ကူးမင်း ခေါင်းလောင်းတော်), also known as the Maha Gandha Bell, is a large bell located at the Shwedagon Pagoda in Yangon, Myanmar (Burma). It was donated in 1779 by King Singu, the fourth king of Konbaung Dynasty. The official Pali name of the bell is Maha Gandha, which means "Great Sound".

== Description ==
The bell weighs about 23-25 tons and measures 2.13 metres (7.0 ft) high, 2.01 metres (6.6 ft) wide at the mouth and 0.305 metres (1.00 ft) thick. There are twelve lines of inscription on the bell. The inscriptions describe King Singu, who came to the throne on 9 June 1776, who ruled over the country of 16 provinces, cast and donated the bell to the Shwedagon Pagoda on 17 January 1779.

== History ==
The bell was cast between 1776 and 1779. In 1825, British attempted to take it from the pagoda during first Anglo-Burmese War. However, the ship that carried the bell to Calcutta sank in Yangon River together with the bell. After several unsuccessful attempts to salvage the bell, British finally gave up. Then, a group of Burmese people successfully raised the bell from the riverbed and restored to its original position at the pagoda.

== Current status ==
The bell is housed in a pavilion located on the northwest side of the pagoda's middle terrace.

== See also ==
- List of heaviest bells
