= Bell of Good Luck =

Heaviest functioning bell in the world

Coordinates: 33.737885°N 112.906487°E

The Bell of Good Luck (Chinese: 吉祥钟; pinyin: Jixiang zhong) is a large bell located in Foquan Temple (佛泉寺) in Pingdingshan, Henan, China. It is close to the Spring Temple Buddha, the world's tallest Buddha statue. The bell weighs 116 metric tons (255,736 lbs.), and is 8.108 metres in height and 5.118 metres in diameter at its widest point. The Bell of Good Luck therefore, at the time of its construction, claimed the title of heaviest functioning bell in the world.

The bell was cast in December 2000 and first rung at midnight on New Year's Eve the same month. The bell's shoulder section is adorned with 36 lotus petal patterns.

== See also ==
- List of heaviest bells
