= Big Bell Temple =

Buddhist temple in Beijing, China

- Dazhong Temple, Juesheng Temple
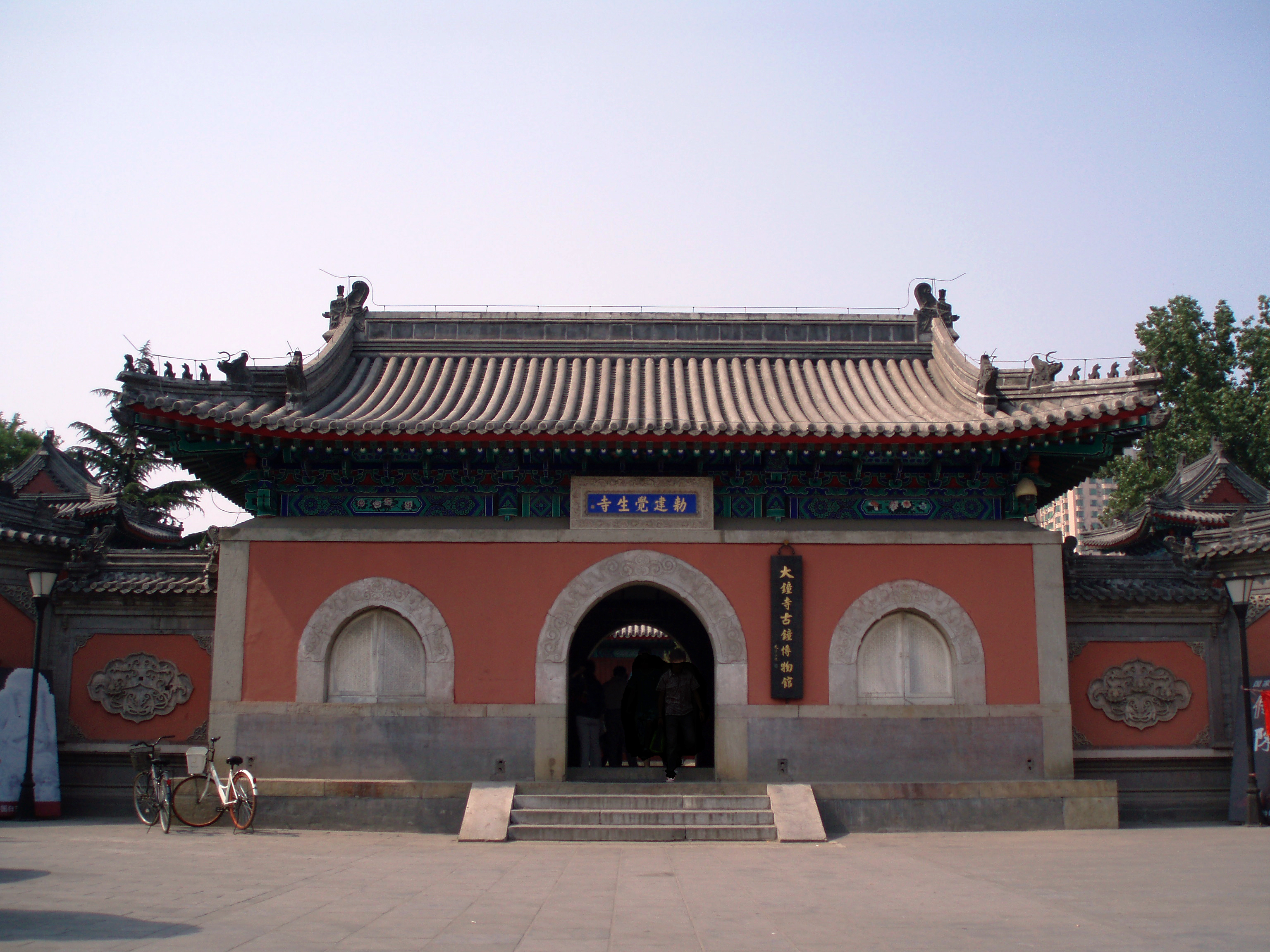
- The temple's entrance

- Location in Beijing

Religion
- Affiliation: Buddhism

Location
- Country: China
- Coordinates: 39°58′05″N 116°19′55″E

The Big Bell Temple, or Dazhong Temple (simplified Chinese: 大钟寺; traditional Chinese: 大鐘寺; pinyin: Dàzhōng Sì), originally known as Juesheng Temple (simplified Chinese: 觉生寺; traditional Chinese: 覺生寺; pinyin: Juéshēng Sì), is a Buddhist temple located on the North 3rd Ring Road in Haidian District, Beijing, China.

The Big Bell Temple was built in 1733 during the reign of the Yongzheng Emperor of the Qing dynasty (1644-1911). The temple's name came after the famous "Yongle Big Bell" that is housed inside the temple, which was cast during the reign of the Yongle Emperor (1403-1424) of the Ming dynasty (1368-1644). According to a test by the Chinese Academy of Sciences, the Yongle Big Bell's sound could reaches up to 120 decibels and can be heard 50 kilometers away from the temple in the depth of night. Many music experts, including some from the Chinese Acoustics Institute have found its tone pure, deep and melodious with a sprightly rhythm. Its frequency ranges from 22 to 800 hertz.

According to about.com:

The Yongle Big Bell weighs about 46 tons, with a height of 5.5 meters and a diameter of 3.3 meters. The bell is famous not only because of its size, but probably more importantly because of the over 230,000 characters of Buddhist scriptures engraved on it.

— About.com

The temple has housed an ancient bell museum, known as Big Bell Temple Ancient Bell Museum (Chinese: 大钟寺古钟博物馆; pinyin: Dàzhōng Sì Gǔzhōng Bówùguǎn), since 1985, featuring hundreds of bronze bells from temples throughout China.

== Gallery ==
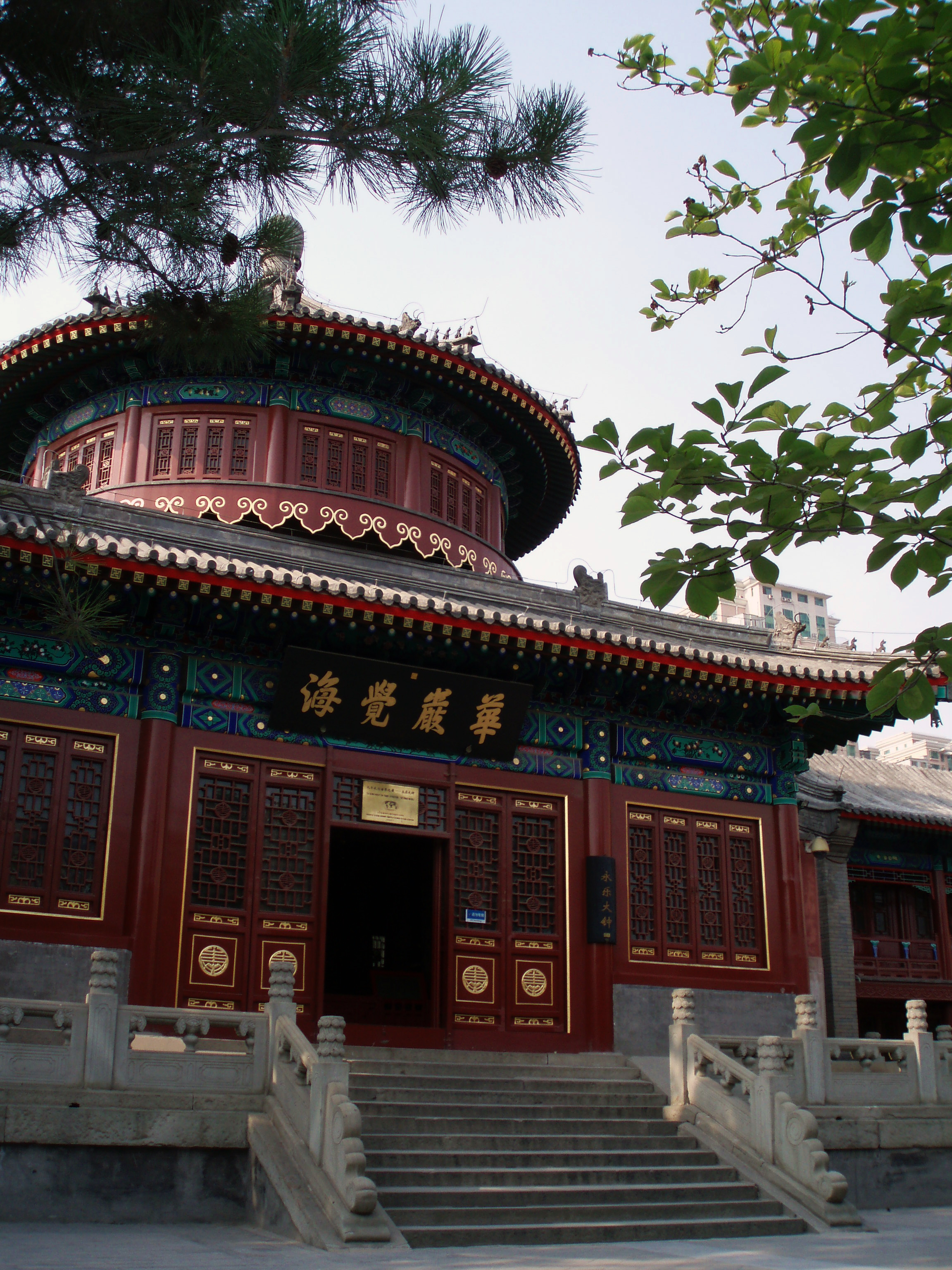
The temple's bell tower

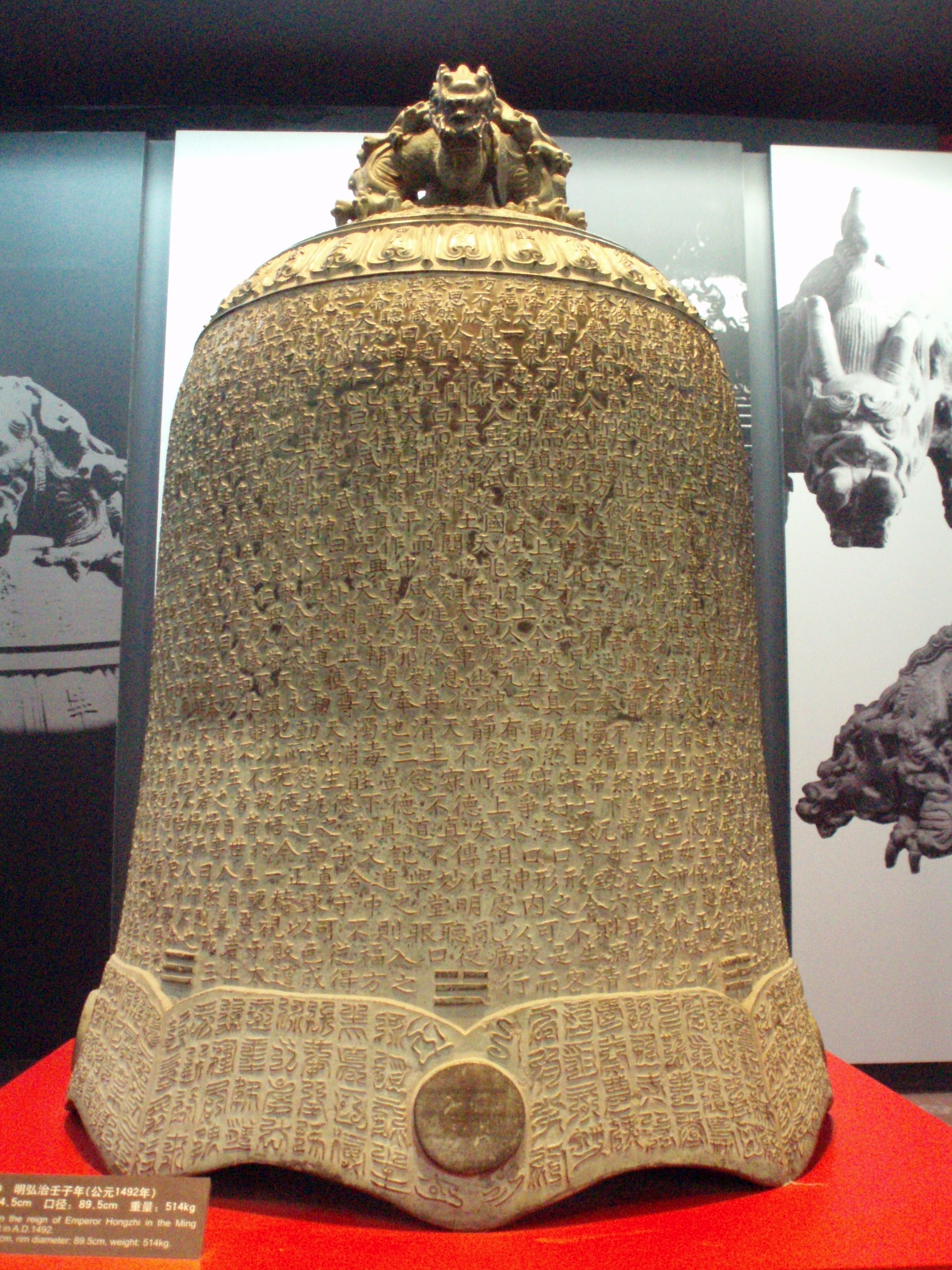
The temple's Ming Dynasty bell

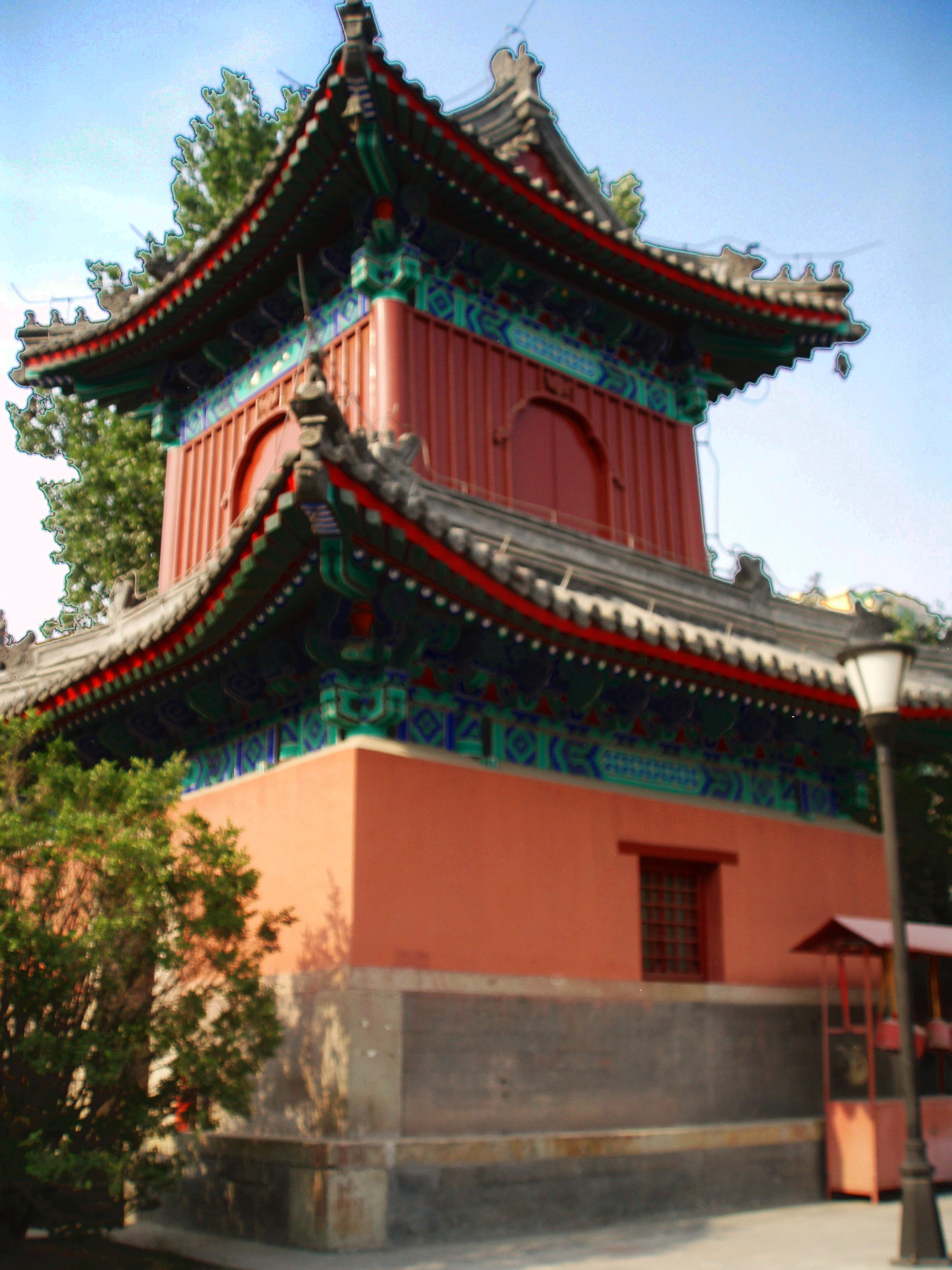
The temple's drum tower

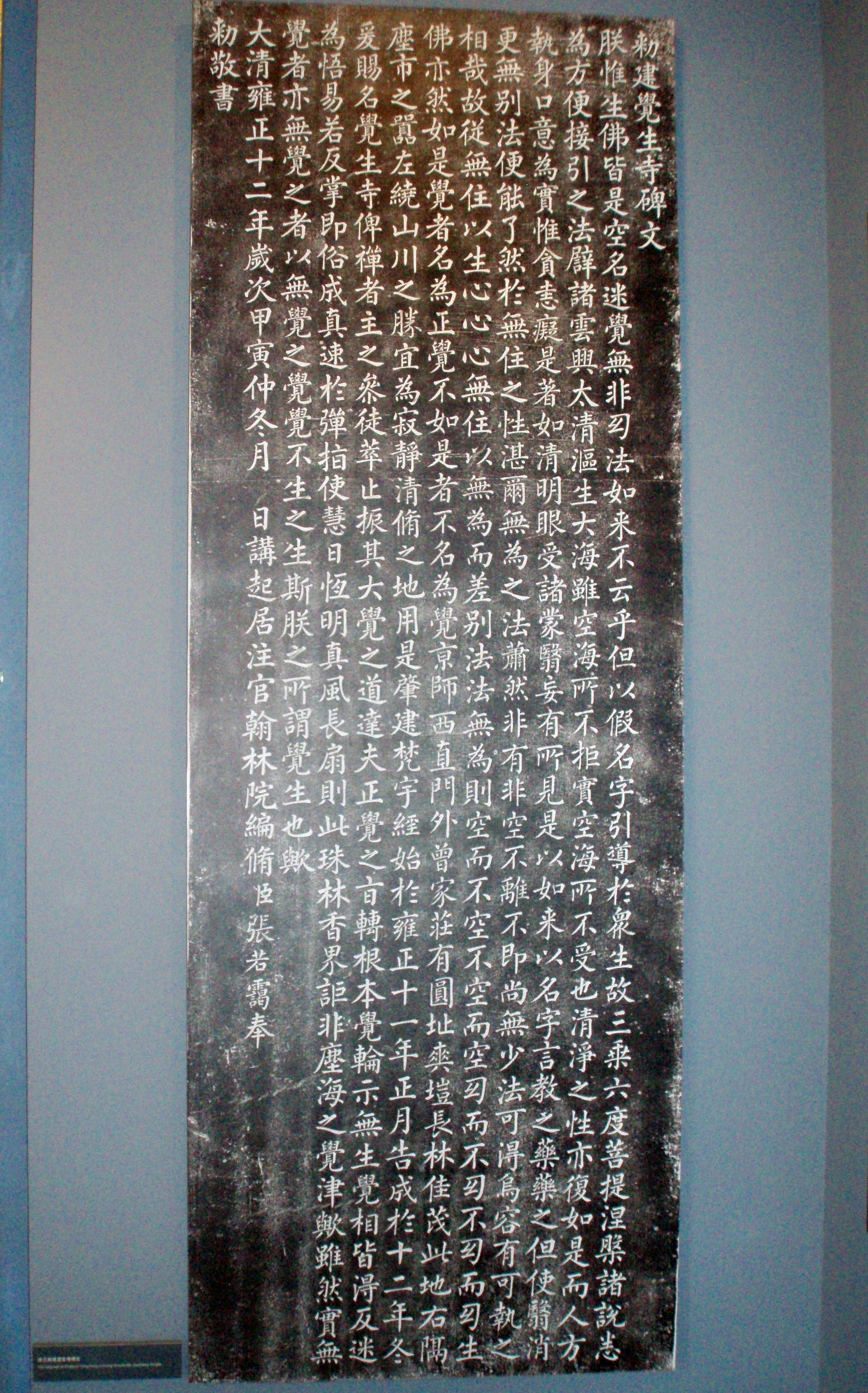
Stone inscription

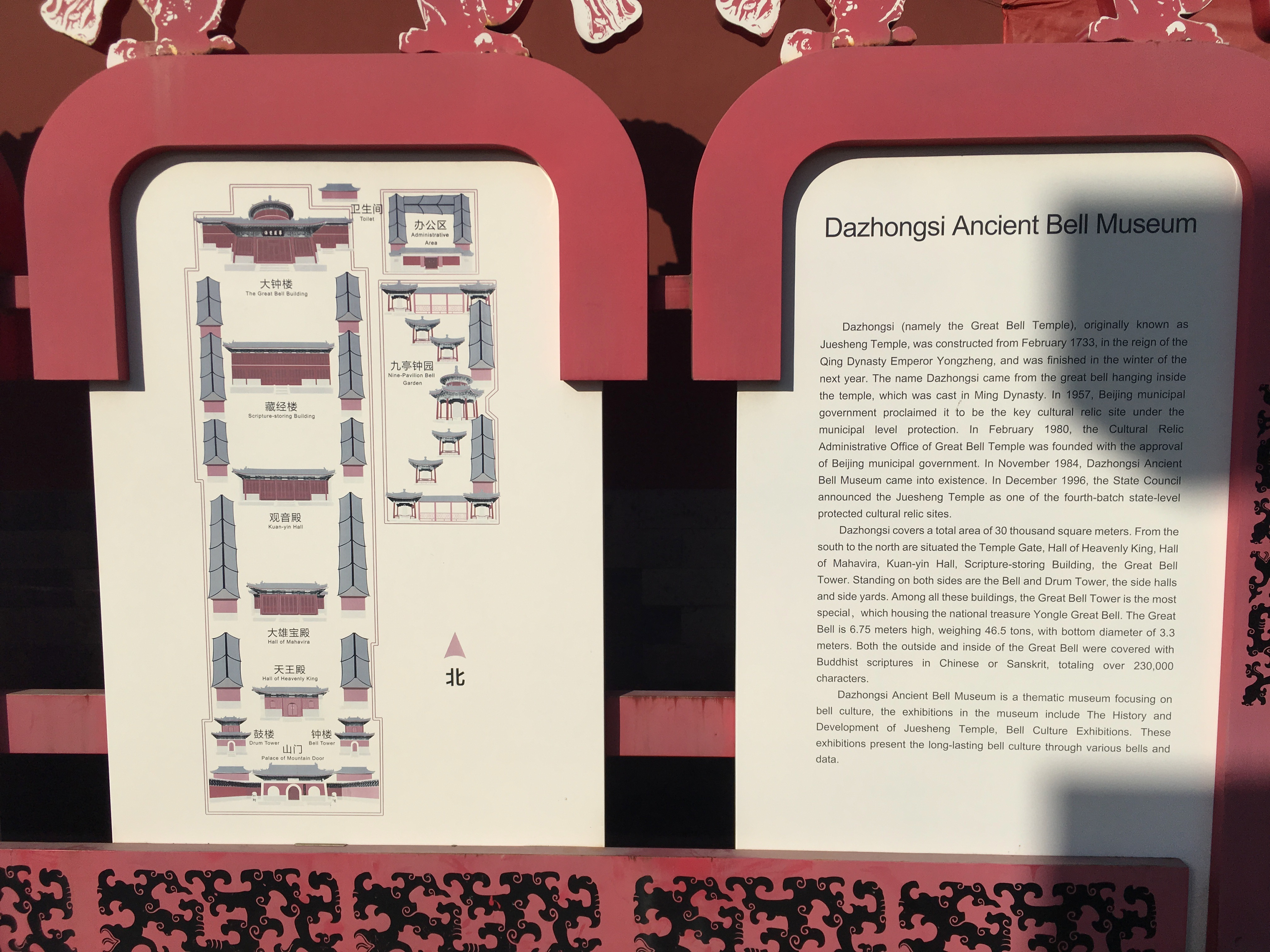
Map of the Ancient Bell Museum

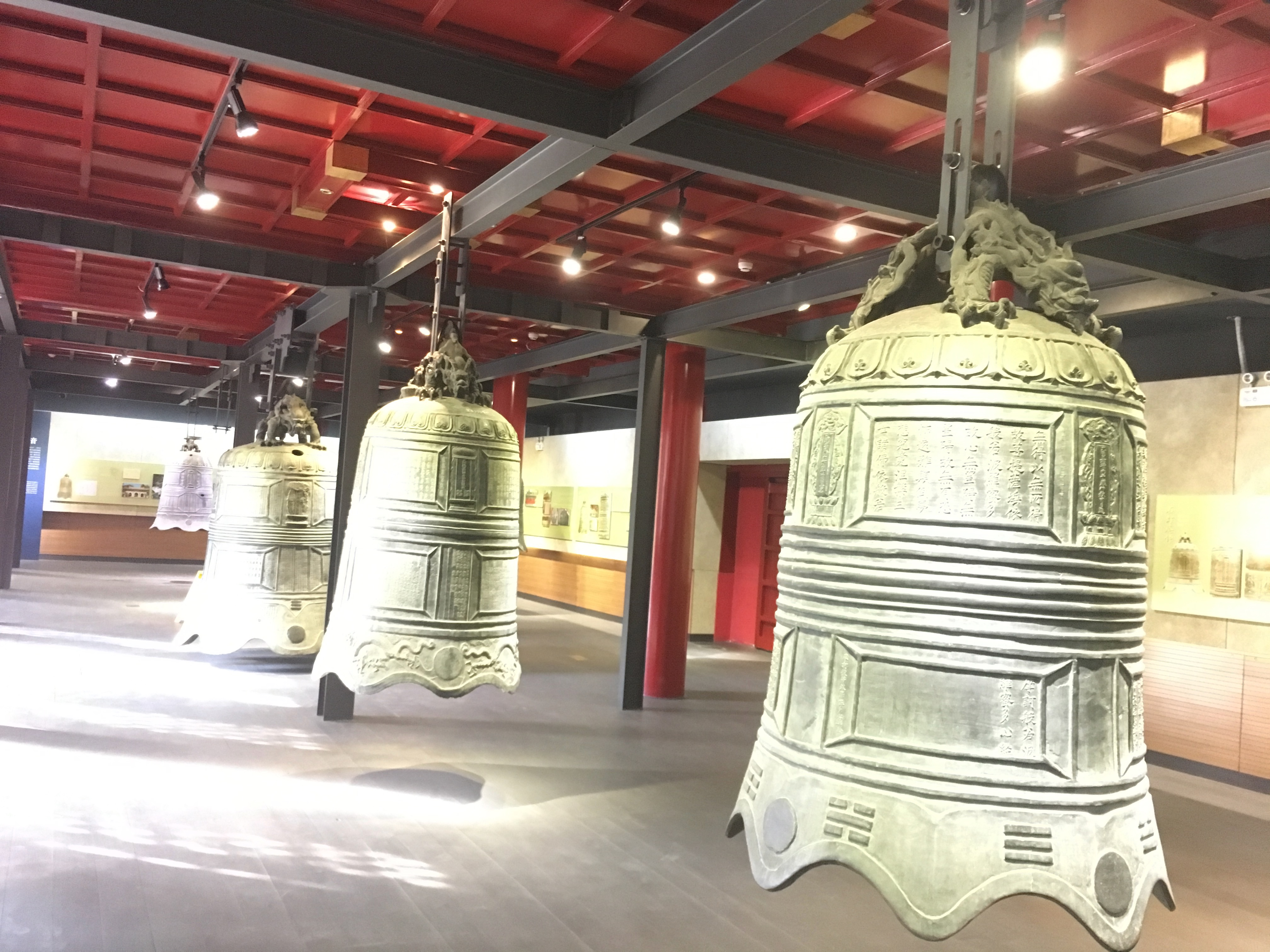
Interior of the Ancient Bell Museum

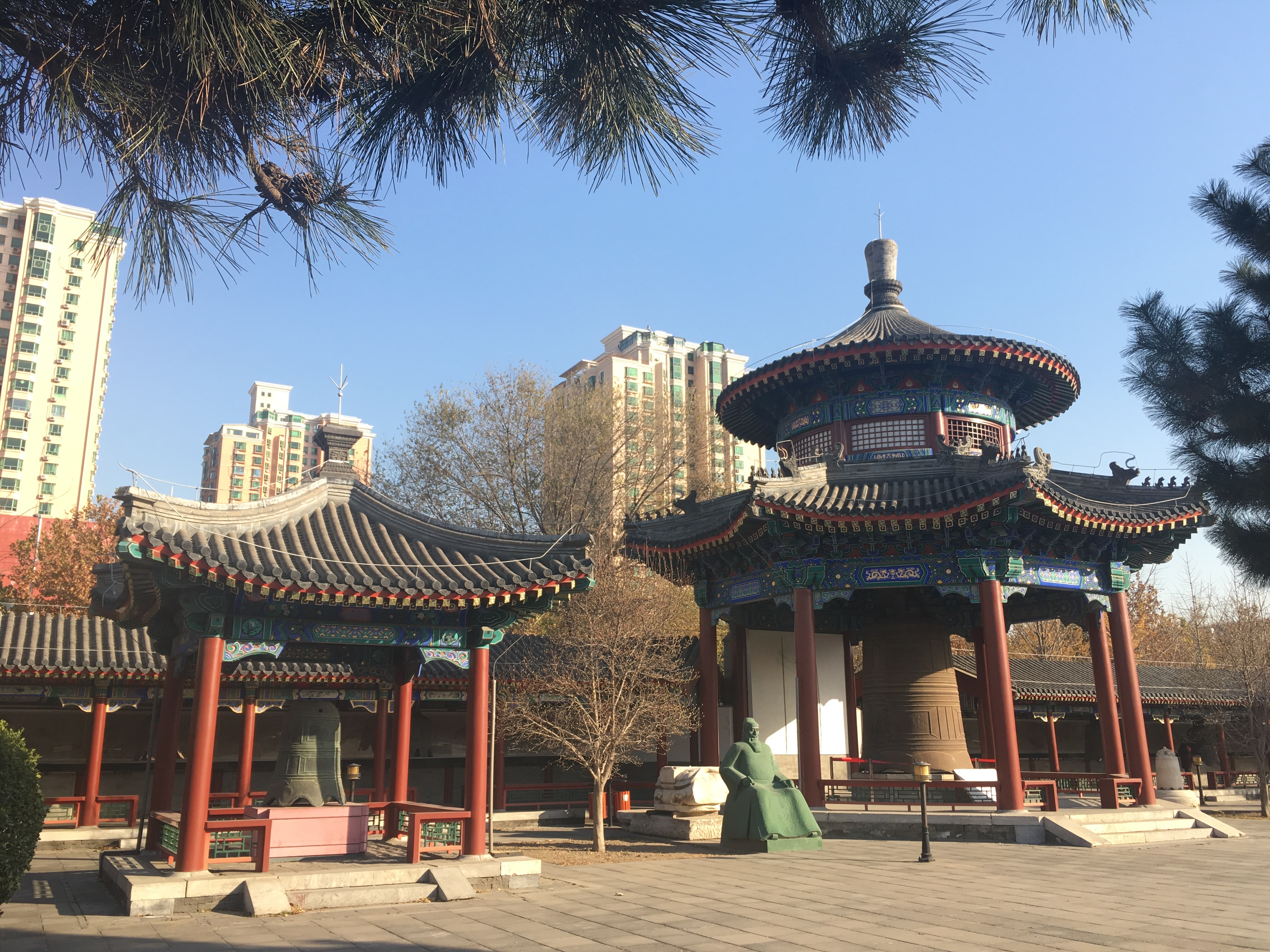
Garden at the Ancient Bell Museum

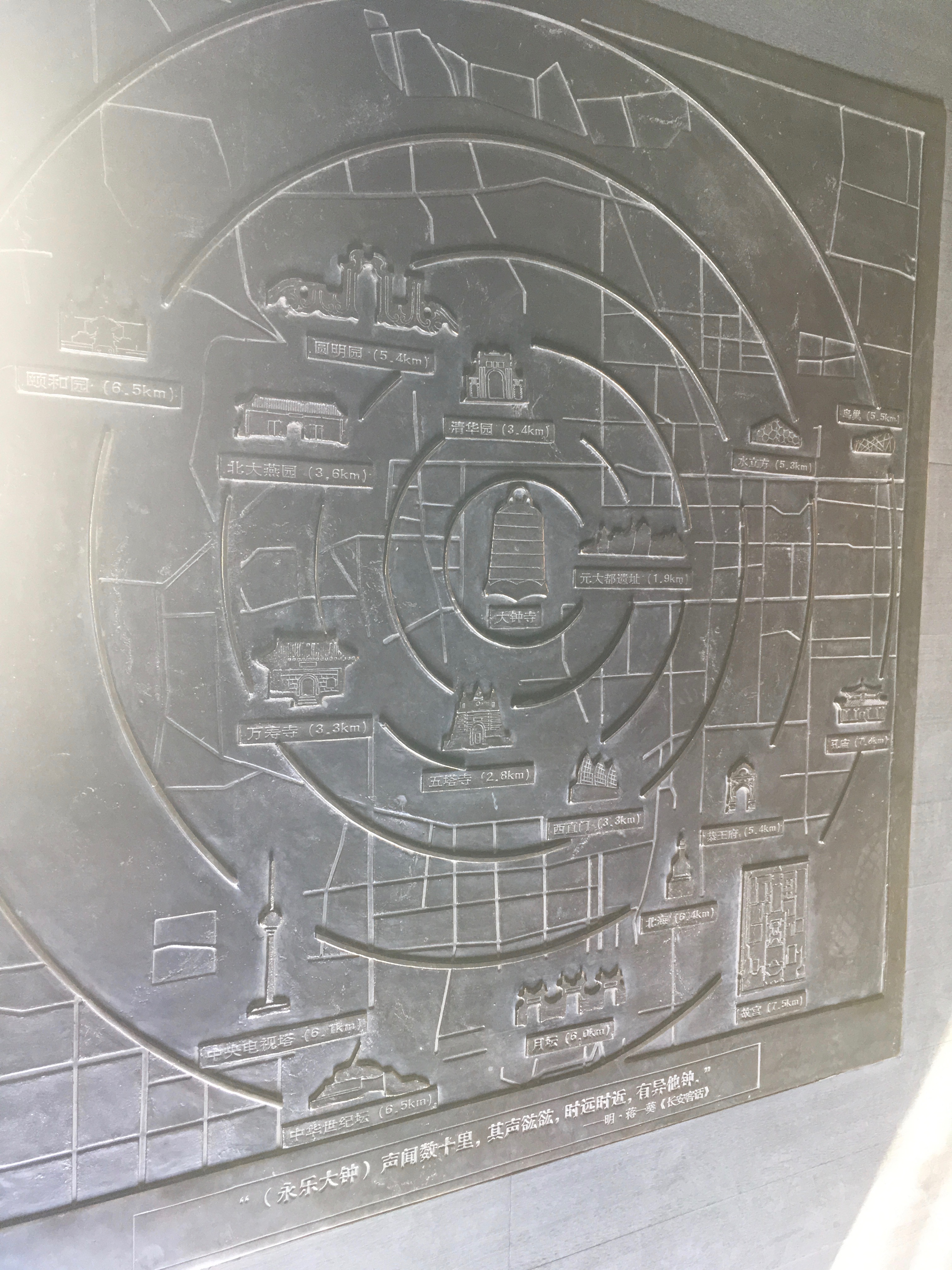
Floor plaque showing the distances where the bell can be heard
