= Flor Terentyev =

Russian bellmaker

Flor Terentyev (Russian: Флор Терентьев) (died after 1700) was a Russian bellmaker of the late 17th – early 18th centuries.

The information about Flor Terentyev is extremely scarce. We know that he cast his bells for Moscow, Pskov, Yaroslavl, and Rostov cathedrals between the last quarter of the 17th century and early 18th century. The Moscow Cannon Yard documents do not mention Terentyev’s name, therefore, most researchers believe that he worked on orders from private individuals. Only one of his bells – the Sysoy - survived to this day. In the late 1680s, Metropolitan Jonah Sysoyevich of Rostov and Yaroslavl invited Flor Terentyev to work on his premises. In 1689, Terentyev cast a 2000-pood (33 Mg) bell named Sysoy for the bell tower of the Assumption Cathedral in Rostov. It is the biggest bell in the famous trio of Rostov bells.

Other much smaller bells cast by Terentyev did not survive to this day. One of them was a 100-pood (1,640 kg) bell, which had been hanging on the bell tower of Saint Basil's Cathedral until the beginning of the 20th century. The engraving on this bell said This bell was cast by master Flor Terentyev. Most likely, the bell was cast at the turn of the 18th century. It was destroyed by the Soviets in 1929. Some documents mention a 600-pood (9.800 kg) bell cast by Terentyev for the Trinity Cathedral in Pskov in 1700, and two other bells of 150 poods (2,500 kg), cast for the Church of Dmitry Solunsky in Yaroslavl in 1696 and 1700. We know nothing of the fate of these bells.
