= Funeral toll =

Funeral custom

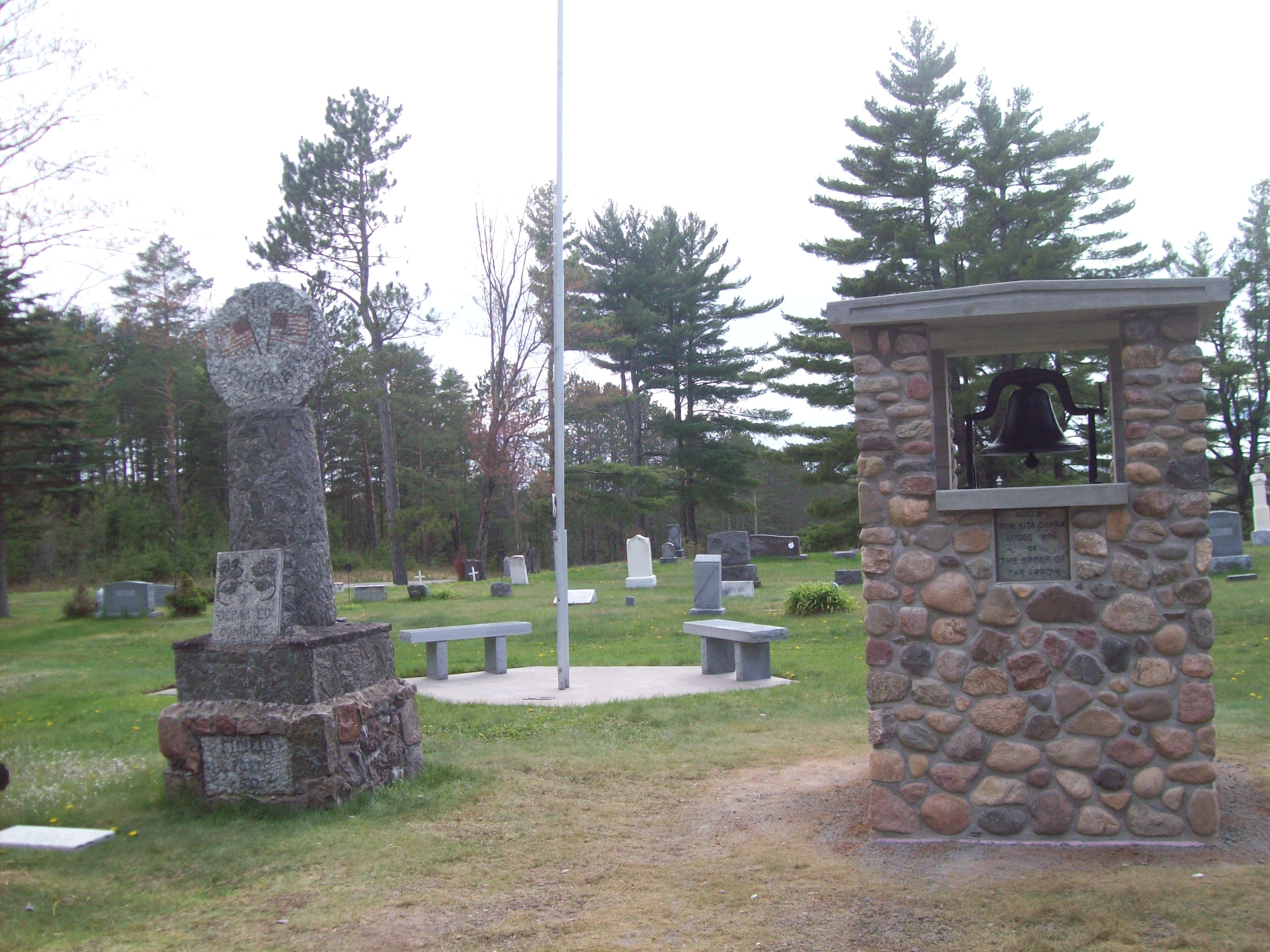
Bell tower at Forest Home Cemetery in Fifield, Wisconsin. The bell is tolled during funerals.

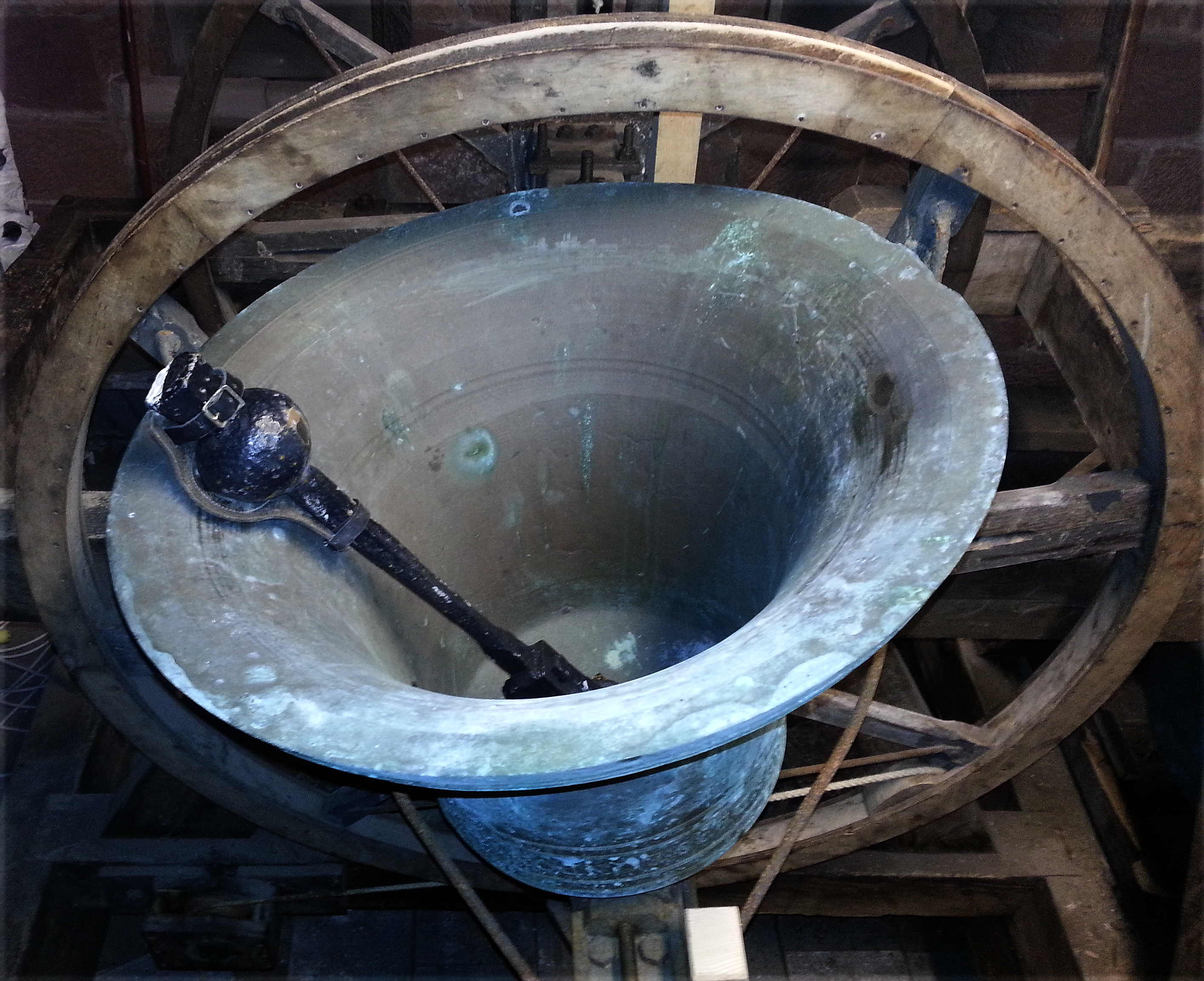
English-style full circle bell with clapper half-muffled. A leather muffle is put over one side only of the clapper ball. This gives a loud strike, then a muffled strike alternately. The bell is shown inverted in the "rest position". Half-muffles are usually used for funerals and occasions of remembrance or mourning, as seen at the Funeral of Diana, Princess of Wales.

The funeral tolling of a bell is the technique of sounding a single bell very slowly, with a significant gap between strikes. It is used to mark the death of a person at a funeral or burial service.

The expression "tolling" is derived from the English tradition of "telling" of the death by signalling with a bell. The term tolling may also be used to signify a single bell being rung slowly, and possibly half-muffled at a commemoration event many years later.

Tolling is typically used for tenor bells in change ringing. It also applies to bourdon bells in a bell tower or cathedral.

== Origins ==
Historically, a bell would be rung on three occasions around the time of a death. The first was the "passing bell" to warn of impending death, followed by the death knell which was the ringing of a bell immediately after the death, and the last was the "lych bell", or "corpse bell" which was rung at the funeral as the procession approached the church. This latter is closest to what is known today as the Funeral toll.

Today, customs vary regarding when and for how long the bell tolls at a funeral.

In churches with full-circle English bells, for commemorative services such as funerals, memorial services and Remembrance Sunday, the bells are rung half-muffled instead with a leather pad on one side of the clapper in call changes or method ringing. Very rarely are they rung fully-muffled with pads both sides. This can often be a quarter peal or peal – the latter lasting three hours.

Big Ben, the bell in the Elizabeth Tower in London, has, since 1910, been tolled at the funeral of a British sovereign, the number of strokes equalling the number of years of the sovereign's life.

== See also ==
- Dead bell
- Death knell
- Ring of bells
- For Whom the Bell Tolls by Ernest Hemingway (quoting John Donne)
- The Nine Tailors by Dorothy L Sayers

== Video ==
- Video of English church bells being rung half-muffled, and then the tenor bell being tolled for a WW1 Roll of Honour in 2016
