= National Twelve-Bell Striking Contest =

Bell-ringing competition in the United Kingdom

National 12-Bell Striking Contest
- Status: Active
- Genre: Competition
- Frequency: Annual
- Country: United Kingdom
- Years active: 51
- Inaugurated: 31 May 1975
- Previous event: 22 June 2019
- Next event: 25 June 2022
- Major events: Change ringing
- Website: www.12bell.org.uk

The National Twelve-Bell Striking Contest is the principal change ringing striking competition in the United Kingdom. It has been held annually since 1975, and is open to any tower where 12-bell ringing is practised regularly. The winners of the competition are awarded the Taylor Trophy.

In recent years the competition has become more regimented; it is now common practice that eliminators are held in good time before each year's final, and that all teams must qualify in the eliminators to compete in the final (with the occasional exception of teams representing host towers). The eliminators are usually held in March, all on the same day, and the final is usually held on the fourth Saturday in June.

The 2006 competition was featured in the Marcus Brigstocke BBC television programme Trophy People.

== Past results ==
=== 2026 competition ===
The final of the 2026 contest was held at York Minster and was won by York.

=== 2025 competition ===
The final of the 2025 contest was held at St Mary, Redcliffe and was won by Bristol.

=== 2024 competition ===
The final of the 2024 contest was held at St John the Baptist, Chilcompton and was won by SRCY.

=== 2023 competition ===
The final of the 2023 contest was held at Sheffield Cathedral and was won by Birmingham.

=== 2022 competition ===
The final of the 2022 contest was held at Guildford Cathedral and was won by Birmingham.

=== 2020/21 competition ===
There was no contest in 2020 and 2021.

=== 2019 competition ===
The final of the 2019 contest was held at Exeter Cathedral and was won by Exeter.

=== 2018 competition ===
The final of the 2018 contest was held at Great St Mary, Cambridge and was won by Birmingham.

=== 2017 competition ===
The final of the 2017 contest was held at Southwark Cathedral and was won by Birmingham.

=== 2016 competition ===
The final of the 2016 contest was held at Ss Peter & Paul, Aston and was won by Birmingham.

=== 2015 competition ===
The final of the 2015 contest was held at St Peter Mancroft, Norwich on 27 June 2015. The results of the final are listed below:

Position	Team	Score	Peal speed	Ringing order
1st	ASCY	91%	3h39	2nd
2nd	Birmingham	89%	3h32	9th
3rd	Bristol	84%	3h34	4th
4th	Exeter	82%	3h31	7th
5th	SRCY	77%	3h41	3rd
6th	Melbourne	75%	3h37	6th
7th	Cambridge	73%	3h34	10th
8th	Norwich	72%	3h35	8th
9th	Leeds	54%	3h41	1st
10th	Towcester	49%	3h45	5th

=== 2014 competition ===
The final of the 2014 contest was held at Christ Church, Oxford and was won by Birmingham.

=== 2013 competition ===
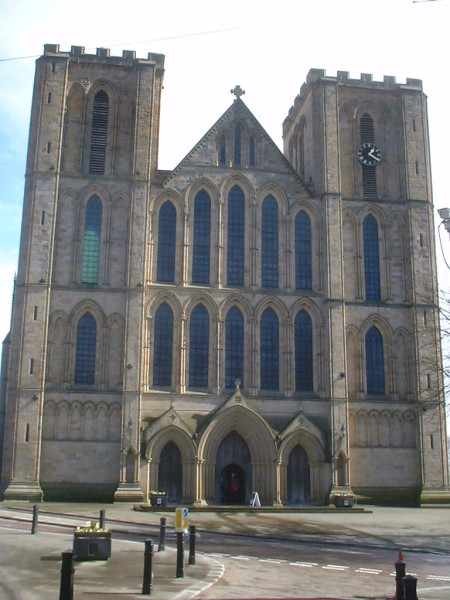
Ripon Cathedral

The final of the 2013 National Twelve-Bell Striking Contest was held at Ripon Cathedral, North Yorkshire on Saturday 22 June. The results of the final are listed below:

Position	Team	Score	Peal speed	Ringing order
1st	Birmingham	91%	3h27	5th
2nd	Cambridge	84%	3h24	7th
3rd	Bristol	83%	3h28	3rd
4th	SRCY	82%	3h22	4th
5th	Leeds	81%	3h26	8th
6th	ASCY	80%	3h27	9th
7th	Melbourne	77%	3h19	6th
8th	York	71%	3h30	2nd
9th	Towcester	65%	3h33	1st

The test piece for the 2013 final was six leads of Cambridge Surprise Maximus.

In a landmark move, the 2013 competition marked the first time that a live broadcast of the competition, including interviews with teams and judges, was streamed online for ringers around the world. It was hosted by the presenter and bellringer Matthew Tosh.

=== Previous winners ===
Year	Winning Band	Host Tower
2012	Birmingham	St Michael, Melbourne
2011	Birmingham	St Peter, Leeds
2010	Birmingham	Holy Cross, Crediton
2009	St Paul's Cathedral	St Paul's Cathedral, London
2008	Birmingham	Lincoln Cathedral
2007	Birmingham	St Stephen, Bristol
2006	St Paul's Cathedral	Worcester Cathedral
2005	Birmingham	St Lawrence, Towcester
2004	Birmingham	St Mary-le-Bow, Cheapside
2003	Birmingham	St Laurence, Surfleet
2002	York	Winchester Cathedral
2001	Birmingham	Ss Peter and Paul, South Petherton
2000	Birmingham	Birmingham Cathedral
1999	York	York Minster
1998	ASCY	St Peter Mancroft, Norwich
1997	SRCY	St Martin-in-the-Fields, Westminster
1996	St Paul's Cathedral	Sheffield Cathedral
1995	Cambridge	Coventry Cathedral
1994	Birmingham	Exeter Cathedral
1993	SRCY	St Lawrence, Towcester
1992	ASCY	Newcastle Cathedral
1991	Cambridge	St Mary-le-Tower, Ipswich
1990	Cambridge	St Nicholas, Liverpool
1989	SRCY	St Mary Redcliffe, Bristol
1988	Birmingham	Guildford Cathedral
1987	Cambridge	Great St Mary, Cambridge
1986	ASCY	Leicester Cathedral
1985	Birmingham	Canterbury Cathedral
1984	St Paul's Cathedral	St Paul's Cathedral, London
1983	Birmingham	The Bell Tower, Evesham
1982	Birmingham	Manchester Town Hall
1981	Birmingham	All Saints, High Wycombe
1980	ASCY	York Minster
1979	Birmingham	St Laurence, Reading
1978	Birmingham	Birmingham Cathedral
1977	Birmingham	Southwark Cathedral
1976	Leicester	St Margaret, Leicester
1975	Leicester	St Mary Redcliffe, Bristol
