= Society of Royal Cumberland Youths =

Bellringers society

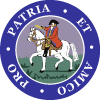
- Motto: Pro Patria et Amico ("For Country and Friend")
- Location: City of London, St Martin-in-the-Fields (HQ)
- Date of formation: 1747; 279 years ago
- Master of company: Jack E Page

The Society of Royal Cumberland Youths (SRCY) is a British society of church bellringers, founded on September 6, 1747 and based in London, but with members around the world. The Society's head quarters is St Martin-in-the-Fields in Trafalgar Square in the City of Westminster, but rings regularly at many of the City of London churches with rings of bells.

The society played a leading role in the early development of change ringing, and today, it provides ringers for important events at St Paul's Cathedral and Westminster Abbey.

Although it is a non-territorial association, its importance is recognised by having four representatives at the Central Council of Church Bell Ringers. They are one of the two major historical ringing Societies based in London, the other being the Ancient Society of College Youths.

== History ==
Copies of historical documents (1747–1999) of the society are held by the National Archives, British Library and London Metropolitan Archives.

=== Formation of the Society ===
It is claimed that a prominent London ringing Society, known as the London Scholars, rang the bells at Shoreditch church as William Augustus, Duke of Cumberland and third son of George II, passed by on his return from the Battle of Culloden in April 1746. Victory was hailed everywhere and it became popular to adopt the name 'Cumberland' at every opportunity and thus the London Scholars changed their name.

Whether or not the Society of Royal Cumberland Youths (The word 'Royal' was added in the 1870s) descends from the London Scholars, there is no doubt about the foundation of the Society in its present form, which, according to the original Name Book, now housed in the Guildhall Library, was on 6 September 1747.

=== The early Society ===
The lists of members from the first century of the Society's existence shows that at that time it attracted some of the great names in ringing history, such as John Reeves, George Gross and William Shipway, and records of the many first performances achieved at that time still exist in the ringing chambers of City churches.

Gross's outstanding achievement, remarkable in its time, was the celebrated peal of 12,000 Oxford Treble Bob Royal at Shoreditch on 27 March 1784, in 9 hours and 5 minutes, which he conducted. The Society marked the 200th anniversary of this peal with one of 12,000 Middlesex Surprise Royal on 27 March 1984.

In 1896 the Society welcomed its first female member, Mrs George Williams. At this time women were still excluded from ringing societies, which were typically male-only organisations. Mrs Williams was the first lady to ring a peal. This is especially remarkable considering the rival major historical ringing society, the Ancient Society of College Youths, did not admit woman until 1998.

== Activities ==
The SRCY meets every Wednesday evening for a practice in a London bell tower, followed by a visit to a nearby pub. The practices are principally for society members, but visitors and prospective members are very welcome. Monthly and quarterly practices are also held in the North and the Midlands, respectively.

While the SRCY is a London-based Society, it has a Country meeting every year hosted by different parts of the UK so it's easier for other members to take part.

The society meets every October for its annual general meeting, where officers are elected and constitutional amendments are considered.

A Peal Weekend is held each year where society members meet across the country to ring peals.

== London towers ==
The SRCY is responsible for the administration and steeple keeping of the towers and bells at:

- St Martin-in-the-Fields (Society Head Quarters)
- St Leonard, Shoreditch
- Christ Church, Spitalfields
- St Andrew, Holborn
- St James Church, Clerkenwell

The society also practises at many other towers in the City of London.

== Publicity ==
There have been several tours to the US and Australia in recent times, which has resulted in US based members getting together on their own accord.

During the 2010 National 12 Bell Eliminators, held on 27 March, the SRCY hosted the Eliminator at Shoreditch. During this event ITV London Tonight covered part of the event, including interviewing the Master at the time, Mary Holden.

== Officers ==
The Society elects its officers at the Annual General Meeting in October.

=== Roles ===
On top of the below key roles the society also elects Trustees, Independent Examiners and Central Council Representatives.

Master - Responsible for running ringing (principally at Wednesday night practices), chairing business meetings and organising peals on country meetings. It falls to the Master to preside over the annual dinner and represent the Society at other events. The Master is also responsible for organising the Society's 12-bell entry. More widely, the role is about keeping an overview of everything that is going on in the Society - encouraging people to get involved and offering advice and support to people who are organising SRCY events.

Senior Steward - Primarily involved in the ringing side of the Society, being a regular attender of London practices where they help ensure things run smoothly and deputise for the Master. The Senior steward undertakes ad-hoc organising of peals and other society events.

Junior Steward - Crucial at London practices as the person who collects steepleage. They deputise for the Senior Steward or Master as required and are the person who meets & greets visitors. Much of the role involves assisting the Treasurer in collecting and recording peals and monies.

Secretary - Responsible for the day-to-day administration of the Society in conjunction with the Assistant Secretary. The Secretary works closely with the Master to keep an overview of all that is happening and takes an active role in ensuring all the Society's calendar events are well organised through liasing with local organisers. The Secretary also organises the Society Dinner. The Secretary is the major line of communication with the membership through the monthly updates and is the first point of contact for anyone wishing to contact the Society.

Treasurer - The Treasurer looks after the Society's accounts. The Treasurer updates members at each business meeting on the state of the Society's finances and produces annual accounts.

Librarian - The Society's small library holds a number of books and records of historical interest. The most valuable are in the care of the London Metropolitan Archives. The general collection is housed at St Martin in the Fields and Spitalfields. The Librarian keeps the library catalogue up to date, controls access, and deals with correspondence and enquiries about the library. The Librarian is also responsible for maintaining the inventory of the Society's assets, and providing general assistance to the Trustees.

=== Past Masters ===
- George Partrick (1747/8)
- William Wight (1752/3)
- Edward Garrett (1784/5)
- Peter Lufsignie (1785/6)
- William Irons (1790/1)
- William Beadle (1797/8)
- Leonard Prevost (1798/9)
- George Lussignea, Jnr. (1801)
- Augustus George Frost (1836)
- Charles Wilson (1837)
- Jeremiah Miller (1840)
- Thomas Michael (1841)
- W H Burwash (1844)
- James Stichbury (1845)
- Charles Goozee (1846)
- William Lobb (1847)
- George Groom (1848)
- William Golding (1849)
- Thomas Britten (1849)
- Henry Haley (1851)
- John Fairburn (1852)
- ? Whiting (1856)
- Jeremiah Miller (1857)
- William Antill (1861-3)
- Jeremiah Miller (1864)
- William C Price (1865/6)
- Robert Rose (1868/7)
- William Hoverd (1871)
- George Newson (1872/3)
- Robert Rose (1874)
- George Newson (1875/6)
- William Baron (1877)
- Joseph W Cattle (1878)
- Henry Dains (1879)
- G Newson (1880-2)
- John Nelms (1883)
- Andrew H Gardom (1884)
- Henry S Thomas (1886)
- J Hannington (1887/8)
- John Rogers (1889)
- G Newson (1890/1)
- J Mansfield (1892)
- Benjamin Foskett (1893-6)
- George W Wild (1897)
- Robert A Daniell (1898-1903)
- Thomas Langton (1905)
- James Parker (1906/7)
- Arthur Jacob (1908)
- Frank Smith (1909/10)
- John D Matthews (1911/12)
- James Parker (1913)
- John D Matthews (1914–33)
- Cecil J Matthews (1934)
- George H Cross (1935–47)
- Walter Ayre (1948)
- George H Cross (1949–53)
- Frank E Hawthorne (1954)
- Thomas H Francis (1955)
- Herbert E Audsley (1956)
- Frederick J Cullum (1957/8)
- Peter N Bond (1959)
- Dennis Beresford (1960–68)
- Derek E Sibson (1969/70)
- Edwin A Barnett (1971)
- Dennis Beresford (1972–76)
- Stanley Jenner (1977/8)
- John S Barnes (1979)
- Graham A Duke (1980/1)
- Stephanie J Pattenden (1982/3)
- Ian H Oram (1984)
- Gwen Rogers (1985)
- Ian H Oram (1985)
- Gwen Rogers (1986)
- Alan Regin (1987-9)
- Linda M Garton (1990–92)
- Simon J Davies (1993/4)
- Douglas J Beaumont (1995)
- Alan Regin (1996-8)
- Ian R Fielding (1999/2000)
- Douglas J Beaumont (2001)
- Ian R Fielding (2002–04)
- Simon R Holden (2005–07)
- John P Loveless (2008)
- Mary E Holden (2009)
- Peter I Harrison (2010)
- Shirley E McGill (2011–13)
- Alan Regin (2014)
- Thomas B Mack (2015–17)
- Benjamin D Constant (2018/19)
- Michael R Crockett (2020–22)
- Jack E Page (2023-)
