= Grandsire =

Method of ringing bells

Grandsire is one of the standard change ringing methods, which are methods of ringing church bells or handbells using a series of mathematical permutations rather than using a melody. The grandsire method is usually rung on an odd number of bells: Grandsire doubles is rung on five working bells, grandsire triples on seven, grandsire caters on nine and grandsire cinques on eleven. Like all odd-bell methods, where there are sufficient bells, it is normally rung with a "cover" bell, which stays in the last position in each row to add musicality.

== The method ==
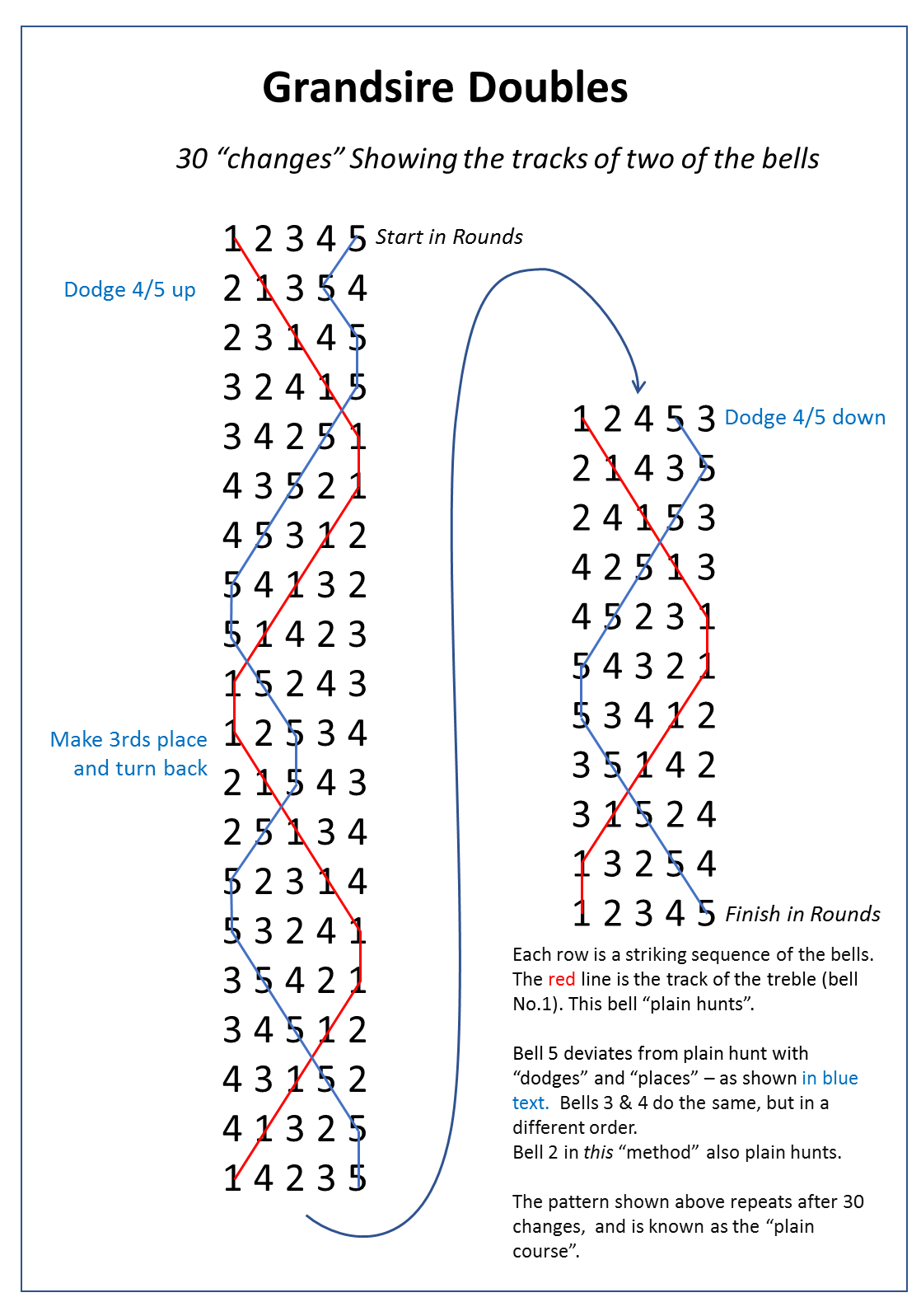
The "plain course" of Grandsire Doubles; 30 changes

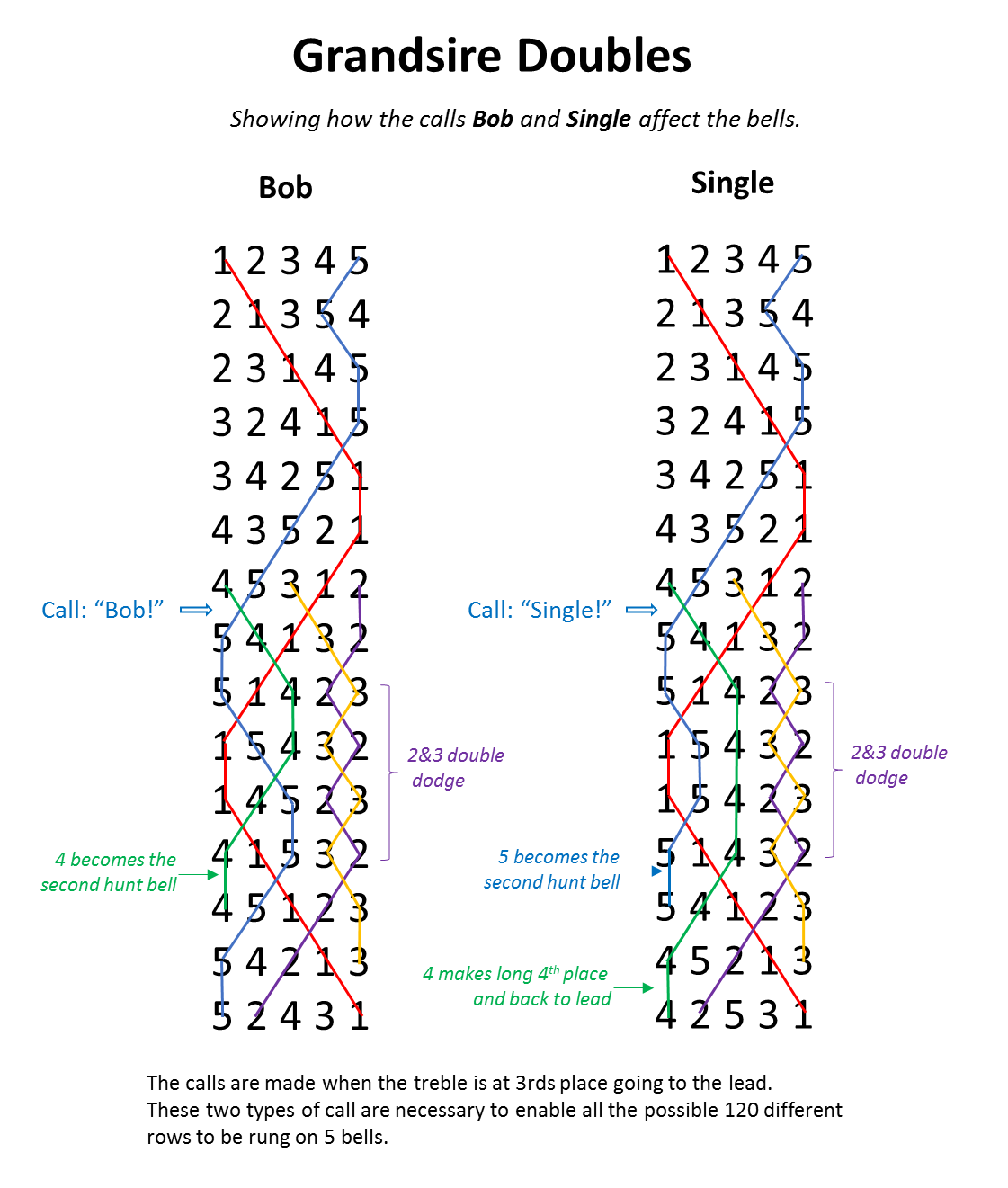
Showing the effects of bobs and singles

Grandsire, like Plain Bob, is based on a simple deviation to the plain hunt when the treble (bell No.1) is first in the sequence or it is said to "lead". The treble is known as the "hunt bell" because it hunts continuously without ever deviating from the path. A second bell also follows the plain hunt. This second hunt bell is said to be "coursing" the treble: that is, the second hunt bell takes its place at the front of the change immediately after the treble.

The remaining bells deviate from the plain hunt as the two hunt bells change places at the front of the lead. When the second hunt bell takes the lead from the treble, the bell in third place remains in place. If the bell in fourth place were to follow the plain hunt, it would take third place, but it cannot, because the bell in third place remains there. Instead, it dodges with the bell in fifth place. After this the bells immediately return to the plain hunt pattern until the next treble lead.

13254	Treble leads
12345	
21354	The second hunt bell, No.2 in this case, leads after the treble, while the bell in third place remains in place.
23145	

This rule can now be extended to any number of odd bells in changes, making Grandsire an easily extendable method.

The plain course of Grandsire Doubles is shown, in which the second hunt bell is bell No. 2. The plain course extends only to 30 different rows or changes. To extend to 120 rows, which is the maximum number of different rows possible on five bells, additional alterations can be made so that other bells become the second hunt bell. These changes are indicated by the "calls" known as Bobs and Singles. These are referred to as "calls", because they are called by the "conductor" according to a "composition" which has been memorised. The calls are made when the treble is in 3rds place approaching the lead. A typical composition shown by the sequential treble leads to get 120 changes is: Plain, Bob, Plain, Bob, Plain, Single; repeated once. "Plain" means there is no call. There are 10 different compositions which can achieve this.

Grandsire is usually an odd-bell method and the following suffixes are used to describe it when the changes are rung on different numbers of bells. There is a normally a cover bell ringing in last place at each row, to add musicality and rhythm, but Grandsire may be rung without a cover.

Changing Bells	Name	Unique changes (extent)
5	Grandsire Doubles	120
7	Grandsire Triples	5040
9	Grandsire Caters	362880
11	Grandsire Cinques	39916800

== History ==
The method was devised around 1650, probably by Robert Roan who became master of the College Youths change ringing society in 1652. Details of the method on five bells appeared in print in 1668 in Tintinnalogia, the first book to be published on change ringing. By this time, Roan had invented a six-bell extension he named "Grandsire Bob", now known by ringers as "Plain Bob Minor". The description of Grandsire predates modern method naming conventions. Grandsire on an odd numbers of bells (as it is usually rung) would share a name with the method known as "plain bob" on even numbers of bells in modern nomenclature. However, Grandsire Bob is a method separate from plain bob by having the 4-5 dodges and thirds of Grandsire doubles, but with long sixths at the back (plain bob doubles have long fifths).

It was found the 120 possible changes of doubles could only be rung by the introduction at some point of "single" changes – that is, changes in which only two bells change position. Only two such singles were required. Historically, it was unclear whether the 5040 (7! = factorial 7 = 7×6×5×4×3×2×1) possible changes of triples required a similar compromise. Although attempts at triples compositions appeared in print as early as 1702, and a peal composed by John Garthon was rung in 1718, it was 1751 before John Holt produced the first satisfactory peal composition.

William Henry Thompson, a mathematician, proved in a paper published in 1880 that it was impossible to achieve the 5040 changes using the normal bobs only, without the use of singles or some other type of call. This result had long been suspected by peal composers, but it had not been proved. Peal length round blocks of caters and cinques were more easily achieved. However, the ringing of Grandsire at these stages was limited by the relative rarity of towers with sufficient bells, and Grandsire Caters was first rung to a peal length in 1717 and Grandsire Cinques in 1725.

Grandsire at all stages is still frequently rung today. It is often one of the first methods learnt by new bell ringers. According to the best available knowledge in 2017, 6,929 peals of Grandsire Caters (on 10 bells) were rung in the 300 years after 11 January 1711. Grandsire Caters was the leading 10-bell method in each decade from 1711 to 1890, but Stedman Caters has proved more popular recently and on 9 July 2010 its cumulative peal total from 1711 pulled ahead of the running Grandsire total.
