= Death knell =

Ringing of a church bell immediately after a death

A death knell is the ringing of a church bell to announce the death of a person. Historically, it was the second of three bells rung around death, the first being the passing bell to warn of impending death, and the last was the lych bell or corpse bell, which survives today as the funeral toll.

== English tradition ==
In England, an ancient custom was the ringing of church bells at three specific times before and after the death of a Christian. Sometimes a passing bell was first rung when the person was still dying, then the death knell upon the death, and finally the lych bell, which was rung at the funeral as the procession approached the church. The ringing of the lych bell is now called the funeral toll. The canon law of the Church of England also permitted tolling after the funeral.

During the reign of Henry VIII and Elizabeth I, statutes regulated death knell, but the immediate ringing after death fell into disuse. It was customary in some places by the end of the 19th century to ring the death knell as soon as notice reached the clerk of the church (parish clerk) or sexton, unless the sun had set, in which case it was rung at an early hour the following morning. Elsewhere, it was customary to postpone the death knell and tellers to the evening preceding the funeral, or early in the morning on the day of the funeral to give warning of the ceremony.

The use of the passing bell for sick persons is indicated in the advertisements of Queen Elizabeth in 1564: "[W]here any Christian bodie is in passing, that the bell be tolled, and that the curate be specially called for to comfort the sick person".

== Manner of ringing ==
The manner of ringing the knell varied in different parishes. Sometimes the age of the departed was signified by the number of chimes (or strokes) of the bell, but the use of "tellers" to denote the sex was almost universal. For instance in the greater number of churches in the counties of Kent and Surrey they used the customary number of tellers, viz., three times three strokes for a man, and three times two for a woman; with a varying usage for children. The word "tellers" became changed into "Tailors". J. C. L. Stahlschmidt described of the practices at each church in Kent and Surrey in his two books about the bells of those counties. It also features in Dorothy L. Sayers' mystery novel The Nine Tailors.

== Half-muffled bells ==
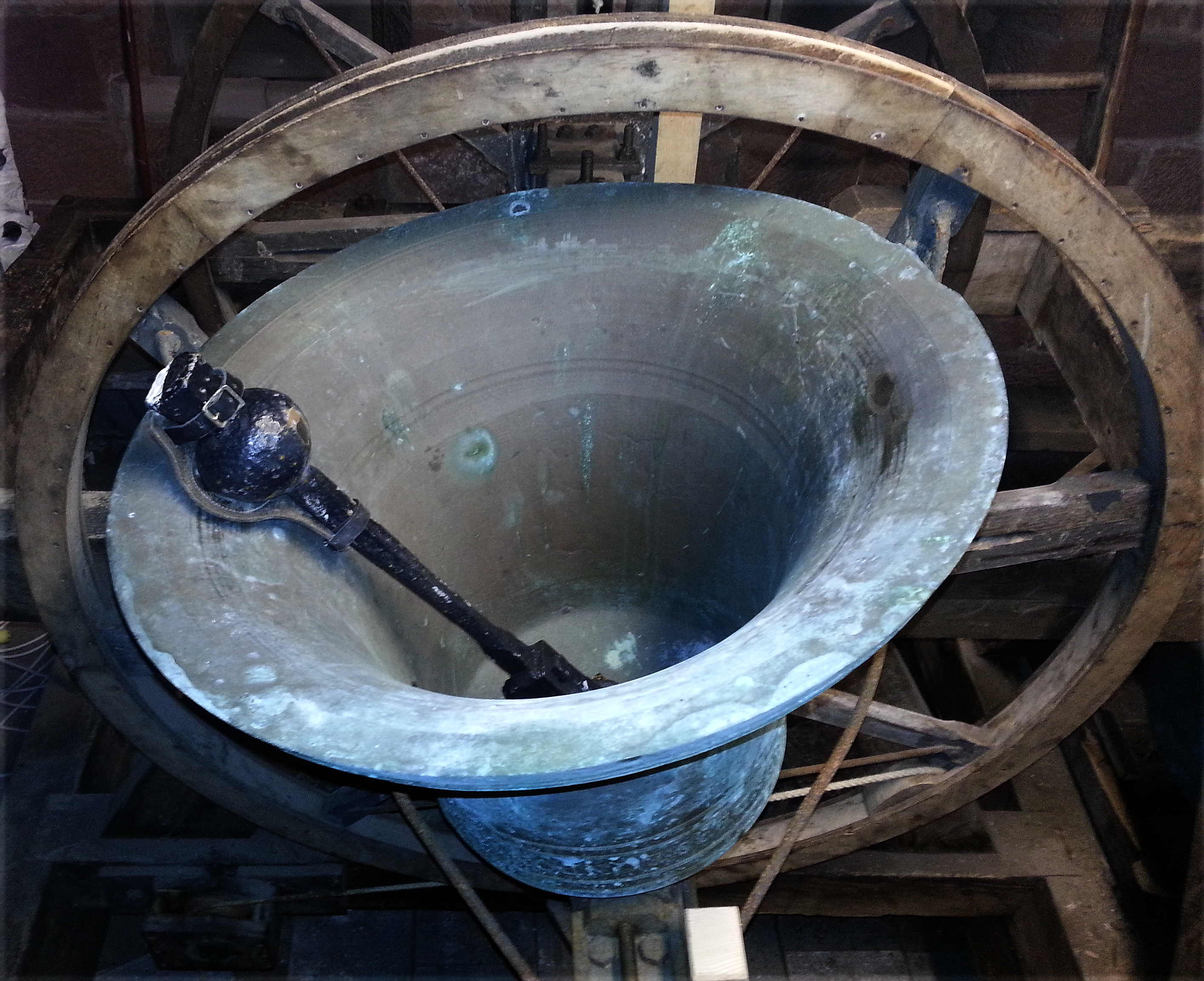
English-style full circle bell with clapper half-muffled. A leather muffle is put over one side only of the clapper ball. This gives a loud strike, then a muffled strike alternately. The bell is shown inverted in the "rest position". Half-muffles are usually used for funerals and occasions of remembrance or mourning.

A modern tradition at funerals where there are full circle ring of bells is to use "half-muffles" when sounding one bell as a tolled bell, or to ring all the bells half-muffled in change ringing. Half-muffling means a leather muffle is placed on one side only of the clapper of each bell so that there is a loud "open" strike followed by a muffled strike, which has a very sonorous and mournful echo effect. Fully muffled bell ringing is very rare as the loud and soft effect is lost.

An excellent example of this was demonstrated with the bells of Westminster Abbey at the Funeral of Diana, Princess of Wales in 1997.

The accompanying picture shows a half-muffled full-circle bell, with the bell in the inverted position (or the "up" position). The clapper is shown resting on the lower side of the bell's soundbow, and when it first rotates (to the right in the picture) the un-muffled side of the clapper will strike when the bell rises to the inverted position and the clapper is moving faster and crosses to the other side. On the return stroke the same happens but the strike will be muffled. Note that only bells swung through a large arc or full-circle can be half-muffled, as it requires considerable rotation of the bell to strike on both sides of the clapper. The tradition in the United Kingdom is that bells are only fully muffled for the death of a sovereign.

== In art & literature ==
"For Whom the Bell Tolls" is a partial quotation of the phrase:

"...And therefore never send to know for whom the bell tolls; It tolls for thee."

John Donne's 1624 work Devotions upon Emergent Occasions.

There are many other references to this phrase in Art and Literature.

== In music ==
In Berlioz's Symphonie Fantastique, the funeral knell was used in the 6/8 section of the 5th movement (i.e. Dream of a Witches' Sabbath).

== See also ==
- Dead bell
