= Margery Sampson =

Scottish bellringer

Margery Fletcher Sampson (10 August 1890 – 14 January 1915) was Scotland’s first female bell-ringer. She was also a teacher.

== Early life ==
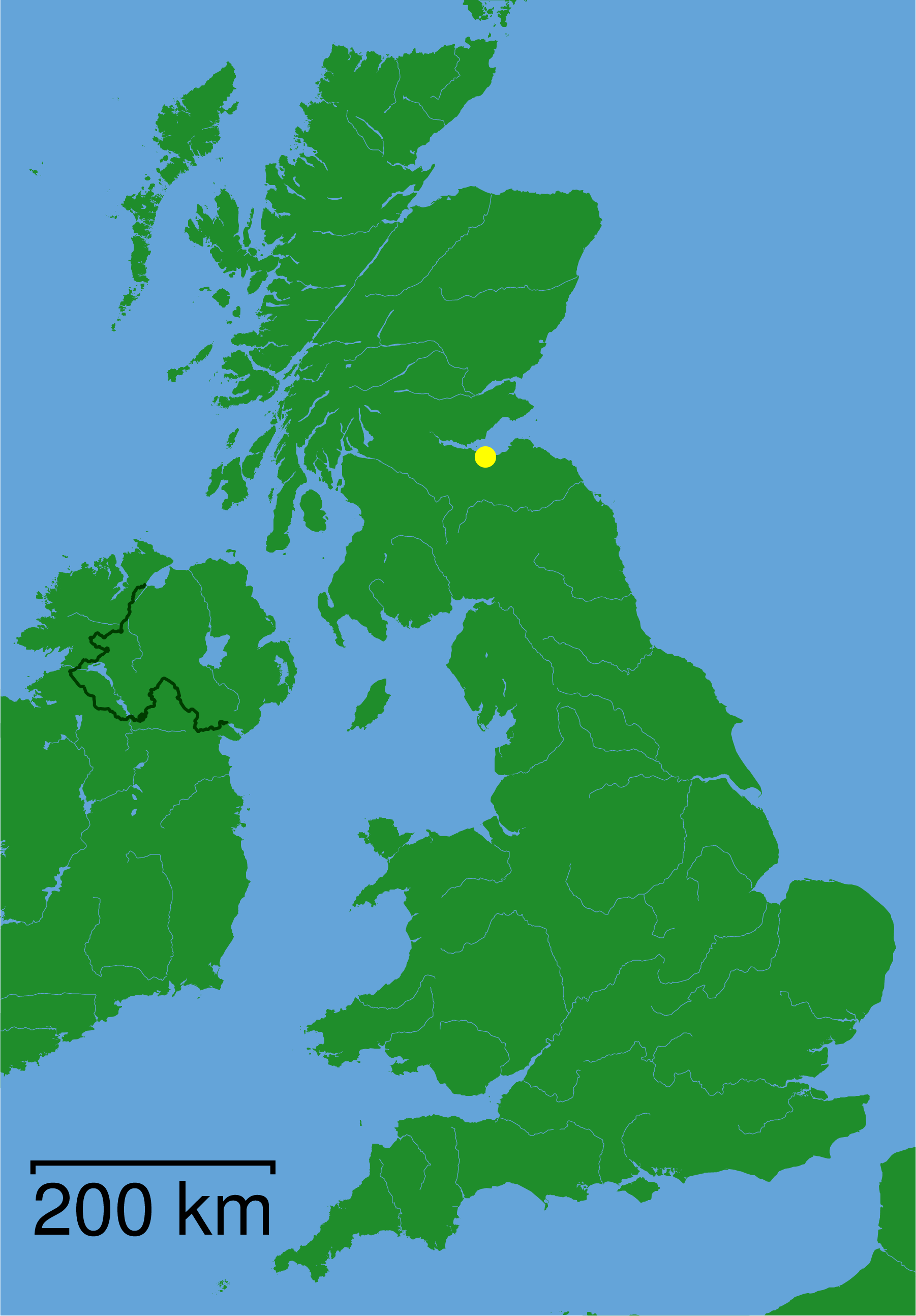
Birthplace of Mary Sampson: Edinburgh, Scotland

Margery Sampson was born in Leith, Edinburgh to Alexandrina Dobbie and William Brook Sampson, a clerk.

== Bell Ringing ==
There were no female bell-ringers in Scotland until 1907 when Sampson became a member of the bell-ringers at St Mary’s Cathedral, Edinburgh, where her father was the ‘ringing master’. Two years later, she was the first woman to ring a church bell in Scotland, doing so at St Cuthbert’s Church in Edinburgh.

Whilst living in Tamworth, England, Sampson became a member of both the Stafford Archdeaconry Society and The St Martin’s Guild of Church Bell-ringers in Birmingham. She went on to found the Ladies’ Guild of Bell-ringers, alongside others. Sampson rang twelve peals and she was the second woman to ring a peal of ‘Stedman Cinques (twelve bells)’ in the world.

== Career ==
After school, Sampson attended the Edinburgh School of Cookery before moving to Tamworth, where she was employed by Staffordshire County Council. She lived in Tamworth for two years.

Following this, Sampson returned to Edinburgh, where she taught at the Edinburgh School of Cookery.

== Death ==
In 1915, Sampson died at the age of 24 years old. In tribute, bell peals were rung in several towers. The publication, Ringing World, commemorated her ‘whole-heartedness and enthusiasm which was an example to others’.
