= Ancient Society of College Youths =

Bellringers society

The Ancient Society of College Youths (ASCY) is a change ringing society, founded in 1637 and based in the City of London. The society played a leading role in the early development of change ringing, and today, it provides ringers for important events at St Paul's Cathedral and Westminster Abbey. Although it is a non-territorial association, its importance is recognised through having four representatives on the Central Council of Church Bell Ringers. They are one of the two major historical ringing Societies based in London, the other being the Society of Royal Cumberland Youths

== History ==
The society is said to be founded on 5 November 1637, although it is possible that it was actually in existence before this date. The first Master is noted as Lord William Brereton. The first ringing by the society was recorded in c.1642, when it managed "a plain six-score on five bells". Robert Roan (Master in 1652) is said to have invented the ringing methods known as Grandsire Doubles and Plain Bob Minor, which are still rung today.

Fabian Stedman, the author of Campanalogia in 1677, also became steward to the College Youths in that year, and in 1682, he was elected Master of the College Youths.

Copies of historical documents (1637–1974) of the society are held by the National Archives, British Library and London Metropolitan Archives.

The society controversially voted to remove its ban on women becoming members in 1998, the rival Society of Royal Cumberland Youths elected its first female member in 1896. Members questioned if ASCY "Should remain ringing's only 'gentlemen's club', with emphasis on its unique male camaraderie? Can political correctness be resisted? Or should all that be left behind [...] What should be the long-term difference between College Youths and Cumberlands? How important is 'national standing'?".

== Achievements ==
Some notable early achievements of the society are highlighted as follows:

- 1684, 18th Nov.: three 720s rung consecutively on the back six bells at Southwark;
- 1690, 7th Jan.: "The whole peal of Plain Bob Triples" believed to have been rung at St. Sepulchre-without-Newgate; and
- 1725, 19th Jan.: The first peal on 12-bells was rung - 5060 Grandsire Cinques at St. Bride's, Fleet Street.

The Society was also a pioneer in "long length" peals; the first of these long lengths took place on 18 May 1728, and It consisted of 10,080 changes of Plain Bob Major. More recently, three members of the ASCY - Philip Earis, Andrew Tibbetts and David Pipe - have rung the longest peal ever, on handbells, consisting of 72,000 changes of Minor, ringing 100 different methods, all of which had to be memorised, and taking 24 hours and 9 minutes.

The Society also rang the 'extent' (or maximum number of possible permutations in the order of the bells) of Major - 40,320 changes, on 27 December 1977, taking 15 hours, 59 minutes to do so.

== Belfry stewardship ==
The ASCY is responsible for the bells at:

- St Mary-le-Bow;
- St Michael, Cornhill;
- St Giles-without-Cripplegate;
- St Lawrence Jewry;
- St Magnus the Martyr;
- and St Sepulchre-without-Newgate.

Its members hold regular practices at these towers, as well as at St Paul's Cathedral and Southwark Cathedral.
