= Call changes =

Bell ringing technique

Call change ringing is a branch of the art of change ringing, in which a group of English-style full-circle bell ringers are instructed continually to create different sequences, or changes, of the bells' striking order. Each command from the leader or "conductor" of the ringing results in a new sequence of sounding the bells. Each sequence is repeated until the next command or "call".

The technique was probably developed in the early 17th century in the early days of change ringing.

Call change ringing requires one ringer to give commands to change the order of the bells, as distinct from method ringing, where the ringers memorise the course of bells as part of a continuous pattern.

== Instructions ==
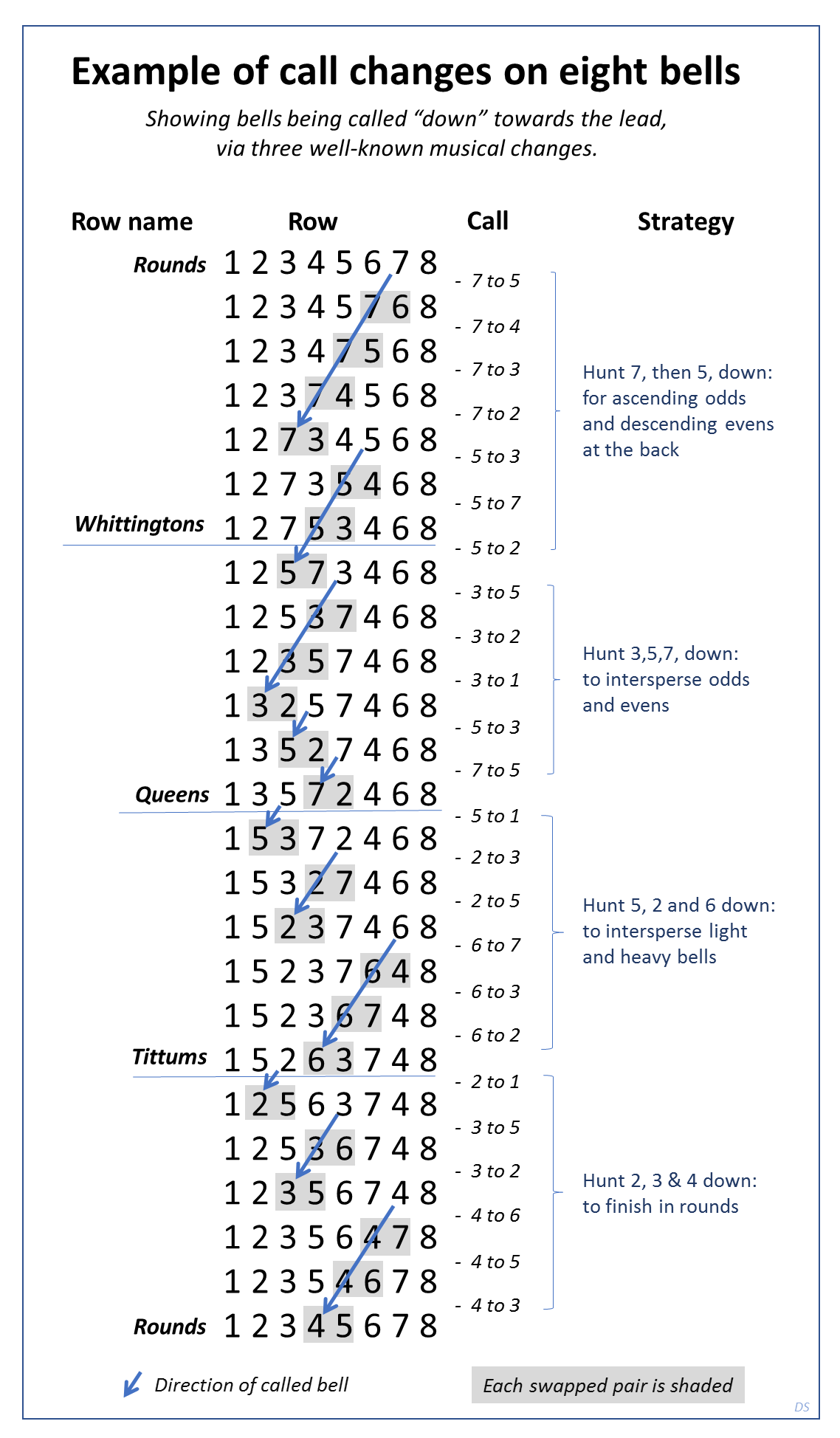
Call changes on eight bells, with the musical rows Whittingtons, Queens and Tittums. This is not a call change 'peal', but an example of calling changes for a short period for musical effect.

Calls are usually of the form "X to (or after) Y" or "X Y"; in which X and Y refer to two of the bells by their physical numbers in the tower (not by their positions in the row). All cause two bells to swap. The first form is used for calling up and calling down, and the second form swaps the two bells mentioned.

== Use ==
Call changes are a valuable step in the learning process for aspirant method ringers. They are normally the next step after learning to control a bell and accurately ring it in "rounds". Call changes are valuable in teaching bell-handling skills, such as the ability to judge the distance to be left over other bells (this is different according to the size of the bell being followed) and to move bells from one place to another in a row. Apart from their training role, call changes are widely rung by choice, or where there are not enough method ringers present in a tower.

== Devon call-change ringing ==
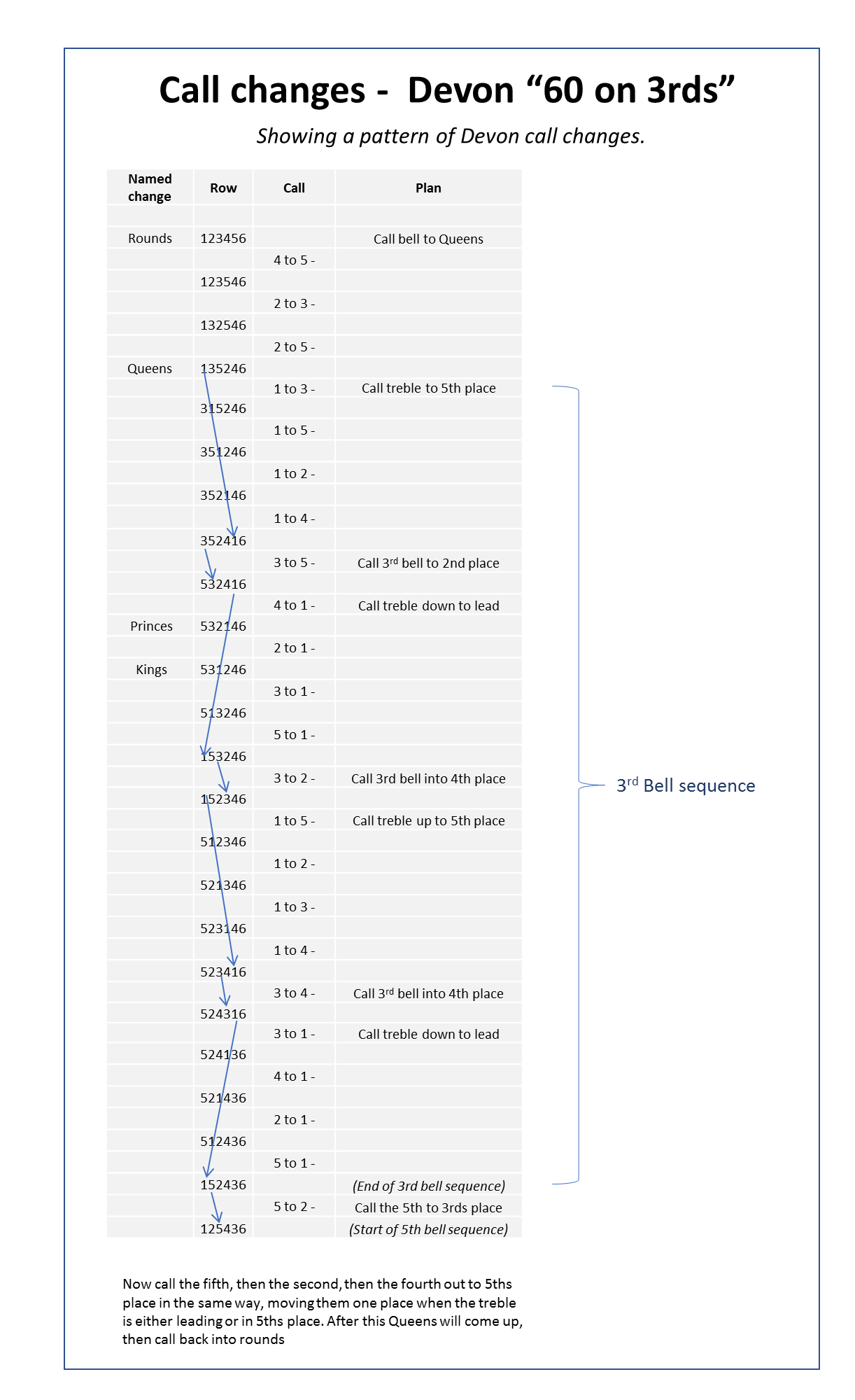
The Devon competition piece, 60 on 3rds is partially shown here to illustrate the evolving structure.

Call changes are also rung as a form of change ringing in their own right, principally in parts of Devon and Cornwall. The Devon Association of Ringers represents call change church bell ringers in Devon and was founded in 1925. The association has 160 affiliated towers and arranges training events, social events and ringing festivals. The call change tradition emphasises rhythmic ringing in simple musical sequences, and there are many noted compositions.

The following is the most well-known call change peal on six bells. It is the test piece for Devon Association call-change competitions, together with raising and lowering in peal before and after. The calling strategy, or plan is shown below. This means the conductor does not have to memorise the 60-plus calls, but only the overall plan.

"Sixty on thirds".

1. Call the bells to Queens. (135246)
2. Call the treble up to 5ths place.
3. Call the third into 2nds place.
4. Call the treble down to lead.
5. Call the third into 4ths place.
6. Continue this process until the third is in 5ths place.
7. Call the fifth, then the second, then the fourth out to 5ths place in the same way, moving them one place when the treble is either leading or in 5ths place.
8. Queens is regained after 60 calls.
