= Method ringing =

Sounding continually changing mathematical permutations on bells

Method ringing (also known as scientific ringing) is a form of change ringing in which the ringers commit to memory the rules for generating each change of sequence, and pairs of bells are affected. This creates a form of bell music which is continually changing, but which cannot be discerned as a conventional melody. It is a way of sounding continually changing mathematical permutations.

It is distinct from call changes, where the ringers are instructed on how to generate each new change by calls from a conductor, and strictly, only two adjacent bells swap their position at each change.

In method ringing, the ringers are guided from permutation to permutation by following the rules of a method. Ringers typically learn a particular method by studying its "blue line", a diagram which shows its structure.

The underlying mathematical basis of method ringing is intimately linked to group theory. The basic building block of method ringing is plain hunt.

The first method, Grandsire, was designed around 1650, probably by Robert Roan who became master of the College Youths change ringing society in 1652. Details of the method on five bells appeared in print in 1668 in Tintinnalogia (Fabian Stedman with Richard Duckworth) and Campanalogia (1677 – written solely by Stedman), which are the first two publications on the subject.

The practice originated in England and remains most popular there today; in addition to bells in church towers, it is also often performed on handbells.

== Fundamentals ==
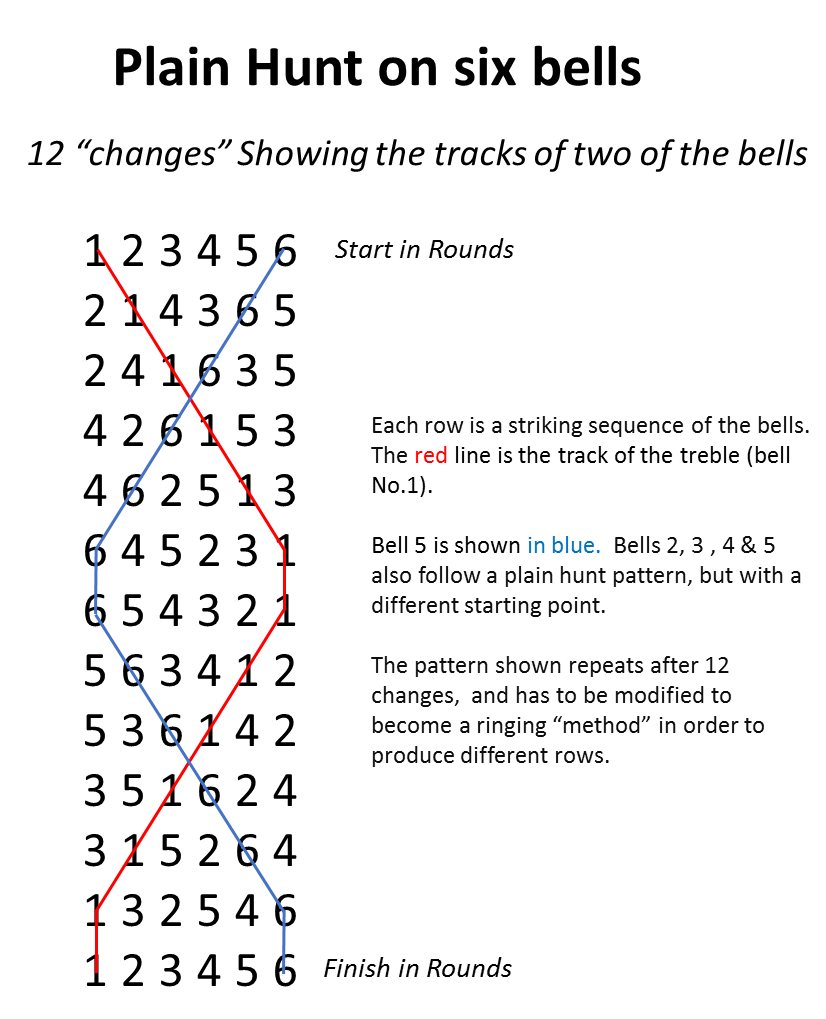
The "diagram", also known as the "blue line", of change ringing plain hunt on six bells. Two bells are shown.

There are thousands of different methods, a few of which are the below.

=== Plain hunt ===
Plain hunt is the simplest form of generating changing permutations continuously, and is a fundamental building-block of change ringing methods. It can be extended to any number of bells. It consists of a plain undeviating course of a bell between the first and last places in the striking order, with two strikes in the first and last position to enable a turn-around. Thus each bell moves one position at each succeeding change, unless it reaches the first or last position, where it will remain for two changes before proceeding to the other end of the sequence.

=== Grandsire ===
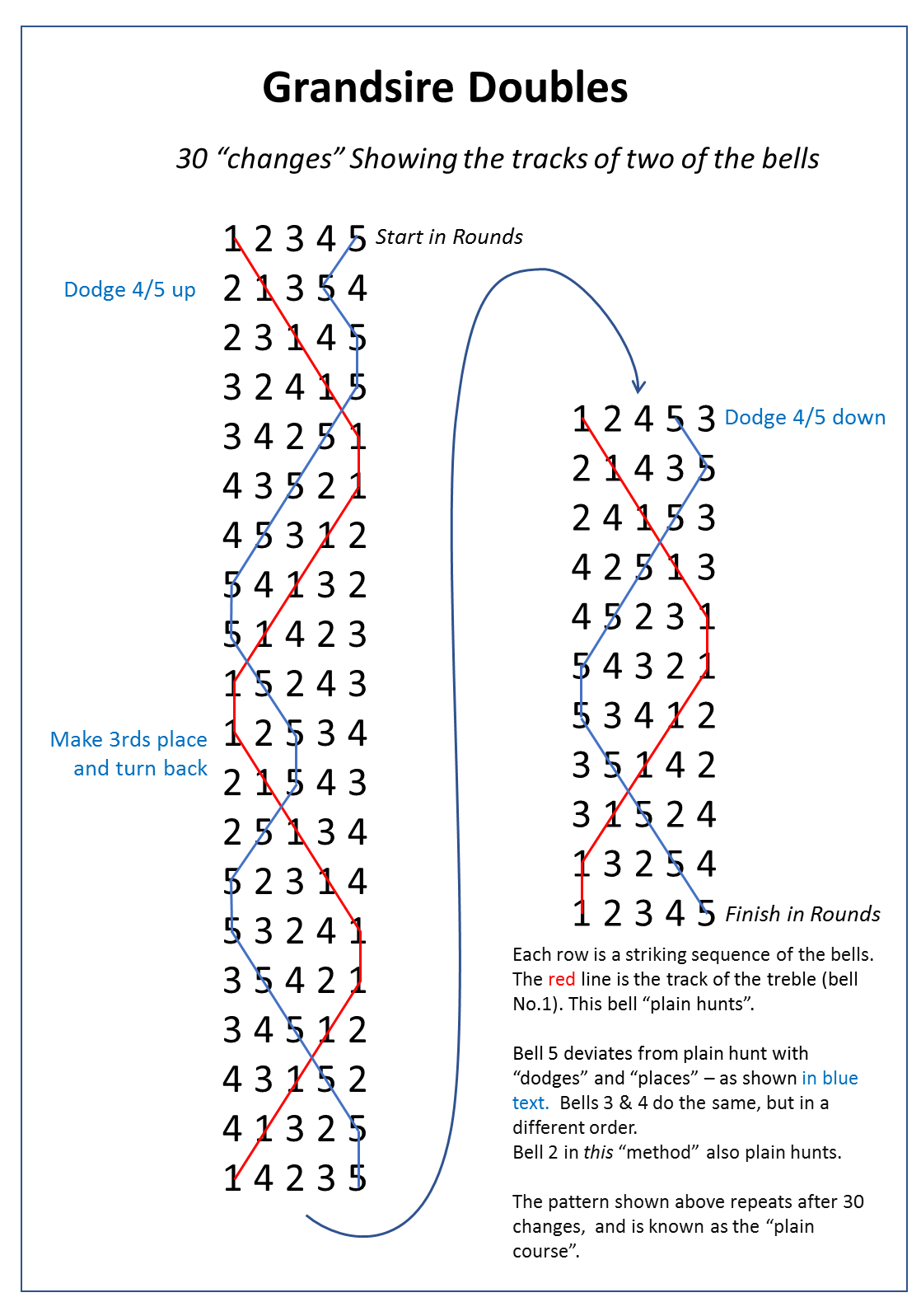
The "plain course" of Grandsire Doubles; 30 changes

Plain hunting is limited to a small number of possible different changes, which is numerically equal to twice the number of bells that are hunting. However, by introducing deviations from the plain hunt, by causing some of the bells to change their relationship to the others, change ringing "methods" were developed. These allow a large range of possible different changes to be rung; even to the extent of the full factorial sequence of changes.

Grandsire, the oldest change ringing method, is based on a simple deviation to the plain hunt when the treble (bell No.1) is first in the sequence or it is said to "lead". The treble is known as the "hunt bell" because it hunts continuously without ever deviating from the path. The diagram for the plain course is shown here.

The Grandsire variation on the plain hunt on odd numbers adds a second hunt bell, which is "coursing" the treble: that is, the second hunt bell takes its place at the front of the change immediately after the treble. The single deviation away from hunting for the rest of the bells now takes place as the two hunt bells change places at the front of the lead.

Furthermore, because there are two hunt bells, not the second bell but the third remains in place:

13254 – Treble leads
12345
21354 – The second hunt bell, No.2 in this case, leads after the treble. It is coursing it. 
23145

This forces a dodge on the other bells in 4/5 positions. After this, the bells immediately return to the plain hunt pattern until the next treble lead.

This rule can now be extended to any number of odd bells in changes, making Grandsire an easily extendable method. The hunt bell is changed many times during such ringing to enable the full factorial number of changes to be achieved.

=== Plain Bob ===
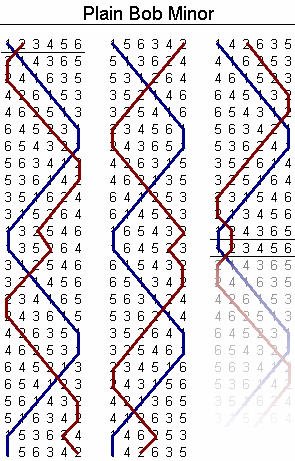
The plain course of Plain Bob Minor – 60 changes. For clarity the bottom row is repeated at the top of the next column. The course of the treble (No.1) is blue, and is plain hunt. Others change their pattern when No. 1 is first.

"Plain Bob" is one of the oldest change ringing and simplest of these, first named "Grandsire Bob". The deviations when a plain course is extended with "calls" are much simpler than those in Grandsire.

A "plain course" of plain bob minor is shown in diagrammatic form, which has the following characteristics;

1. all bells plain hunt, until the treble bell is first, when depending where they are in the pattern, they;
2. perform "Dodges" in the 3–4 position
3. or perform dodges in the 5–6 positions,
4. or sit for two blows if they are just above the treble, then go first again.

The red bell track shows the order of "works", which are deviations from the plain hunt.

1. 3/4 down dodge
2. 5/6 down dodge
3. 5/6 up dodge
4. 3/4 up dodge
5. make 2nds place.

And then it repeats. Each bells starts at a different place in this cyclical order. A dodge means just that; two bells dodge round each other, thus changing their relationship to the treble, and giving rise to different changes.

The plain bob pattern can be extended beyond the constraints of the plain course, to the full unique 720 changes possible ( this is factorial 6 on 6 bells, which is 1×2×3×4×5×6 = 720 changes). To do this, at set points in the sequences one of the ringers, called the "conductor" calls out commands such as "bob" or "single", which introduce further variations. The conductor follows a "composition" which they have to commit to memory. This enables the other ringers to produce large numbers of unique changes without memorising huge quantities of data, without any written prompts.

Ringers can also ring different methods, with different "works" – so there is a huge variety of ways of ringing method changes.

Plain Bob Minor
Plain Bob Minor played using synthesised bell sounds. The bells start ringing rounds followed by a plain course of Plain Bob Minor (60 of the 720 changes that are possible on six bells) and finish in rounds again.

== Key points ==
=== Numbering the bells ===
The highest bell in pitch is known as the treble and the lowest the tenor. The majority of bell towers have the ring of bells (or ropes) going clockwise from the treble. For convenience, the bells are referred to by number, with the treble being number 1 and the other bells numbered by their pitch (2, 3, 4, etc.) sequentially down the scale. The bells are usually tuned to a diatonic major scale, with the tenor bell being the tonic (or key) note of the scale.

=== Ringing rounds and changes ===
The simplest way to use a set of bells is ringing rounds, which is sounding the bells repeatedly in sequence from treble to tenor: 1, 2, 3, etc.. (Musicians will recognise this as a portion of a descending scale.) Ringers typically start with rounds and then begin to vary the bells' order, moving on to a series of distinct rows. Each row (or change) is a specific permutation of the bells (for example 123456 or 531246)—that is to say, it includes each bell rung once and only once, the difference from row to row being the order in which the bells follow one another. Plain hunt is the simplest way of creating bell permutations, or changes.

=== Obtaining the maximum unique changes ===
Since permutations are involved, it is natural that for some people the ultimate theoretical goal of change ringing is to ring the bells in every possible permutation; this is called an extent (in the past this was sometimes referred to as a full peal). For a method on $n$ bells, there are $n!$ (read factorial) possible permutations, a number which quickly grows as $n$ increases. For example, while on six bells there are 720 permutations, on 8 bells there are 40,320; furthermore, 10! = 3,628,800, and 12! = 479,001,600.

=== Key rules of valid method ringing ===
==== "Truth" of a ringing method ====
Estimating two seconds for each change (a reasonable pace), we find that while an extent on 6 bells can be accomplished in half an hour, a full peal on 8 bells should take nearly twenty-two and a half hours and one on 12 bells would take over thirty years! Naturally, then, except in towers with only a few bells, ringers typically can only ring a subset of the available permutations. But the key stricture of an extent, uniqueness (any row may only be rung once), is considered essential. This is called truth; to repeat any row would make the performance false.

==== Allowable position changes ====
Another key limitation keeps a given bell from moving up or back more than a single place from row to row; if it rings (for instance) fourth in one row, in the next row it can only ring third, fourth, or fifth. Thus from row to row each bell either keeps its place or swaps places with one of its neighbours. This rule has its origins in the physical reality of tower bells: a bell, swinging through a complete revolution with every row, has considerable inertia and the ringer has only a limited ability to accelerate or decelerate its cycle.

==== Start and finish with "rounds". ====
A third key rule mandates rounds as the start and end of all ringing. So to summarize: any performance must start out from rounds, visit a number of other rows (whether all possible permutations or just a subset thereof) but only once each, and then return safely to rounds, all the while making only small neighbour-swaps from row to row. These rules dramatically limit the options open to a method-maker.

For example, consider a tower with four bells. An extent includes 4! = 24 changes and there are, naturally, 24! possible orders in which to ring each change once, which is about 6.2 × 10^{23}. But once we limit ourselves to neighbour-swaps and to starting and ending with rounds, only 10,792 possible extents remain.

=== Reason for methods ===
It is to navigate this complex terrain that various methods have been developed; they allow the ringers to plot their course ahead of time without needing to memorize it all (an impossible task) or to read it off a numbingly repetitive list of numbers. Instead, by combining a pattern short and simple enough for ringers to memorize with a few regular breaking points where simple variations can be introduced, a robust algorithm is formed. This is the essence of method ringing.

=== Lead ===
A lead is part of the plain course. It commences when the method starts and lasts until the treble gets back to the same place. In the diagram of Plain Bob Minor shown, the lead starts when the treble rings in second place and lasts until the treble has rung twice at lead. It is common practice in diagrams to draw a line under the lead end to assist in understanding the method. Most methods have a plain course consisting of a number of leads where the pattern is the same, but different bells are in differing places. In the diagram given, the number 4 bell rings the same pattern as the number 2, but one lead earlier.

In principles (where the treble does the same work as other bells and is affected by calls) the definition of a lead can become more complex.

=== Calls and compositions ===
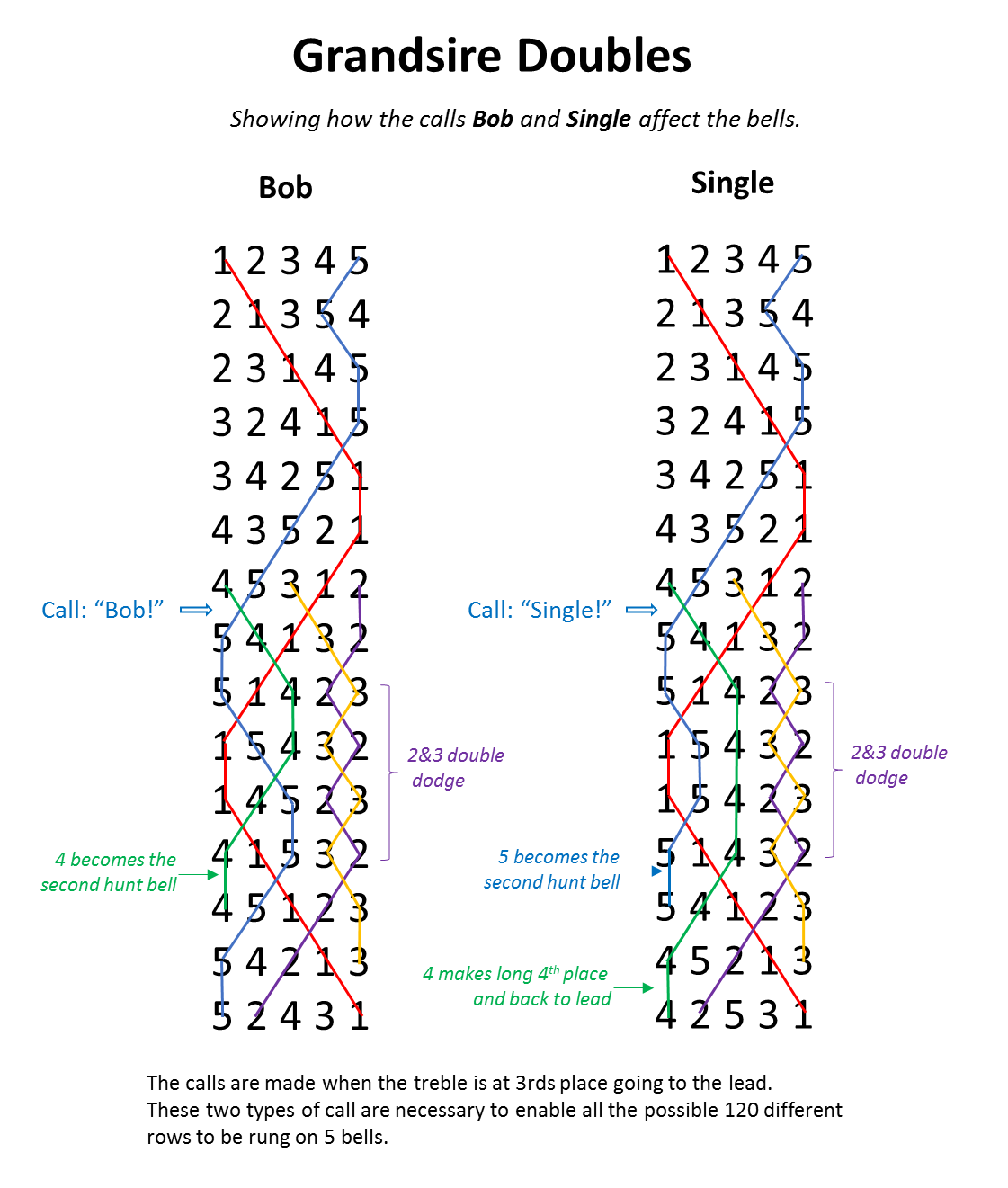
Showing the effects of bobs and singles

To obtain more changes than available in the plain course, a conductor makes a call directing the ringers to make a slight variation in the course. (The most common calls are called bobs and singles.) These variations usually last only one change, but cause two or more ringers to swap their paths, whereupon they continue with the normal pattern. By introducing such calls appropriately, repetition can be avoided, with the peal remaining true over a large number of changes. For example, an extent in a minor method is 720 (6!) changes, so would require 12 repetitions of the plain course shown.

To know when to make calls and which ones to make, a conductor follows a plan called a composition which he or someone else devised; if properly constructed it will ensure a true performance of the desired length. Today computers make checking a composition's truth easy; but the process once involved a mix of mathematics and laborious row-by-row checking.

Probably the greatest composer of the 20th century was Albert J Pitman, who composed over a hundred peals between 1910 and 1965, entirely by hand. None of his compositions was then, nor since, discovered to be false.

=== Place Notation (shorthand) ===
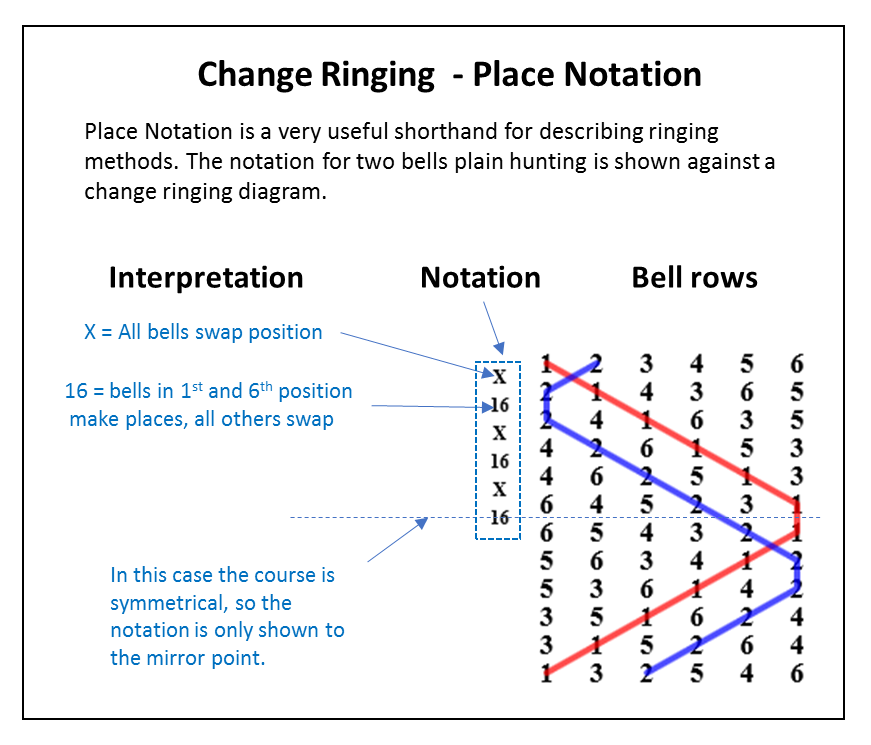
Place notation in English-style change ringing

As well as writing out the changes longhand (as in the accompanying illustration of Plain Bob Minor) there is a shorthand called Place Notation. For each row in which all bells change place, such as the first change, use an "x" or a "-". In rows where one or more bells stay in place write down the place numbers which do not change, so that the second row is written "16". Plain Bob Minor is therefore x16x16x16x16x16x12.

Many methods are symmetrical, and so only the first half lead is given, along with possibly the lead end. Plain Bob Minor is thus: x16x16x16 le:12. Where two changes consisting of numbers follow each other, use a dot to separate them. Plain Bob Doubles (i.e. on 5 bells) is: 5.1.5.1.5 le:125, or if written at full length 5.1.5.1.5.1.5.1.5.125.

== Method names ==
Methods are generally referred to by an official name assigned to them by the Central Council of Church Bell Ringers; such names have three standard parts: the method's name proper, its class, and its stage.

The name proper is the method's personal name. The oldest methods have long-established names; but new methods are constantly being devised and rung, and the Central Council generally allows each to be named by the band which first rings a peal in it. Most often these methods end up with a place name, such as the band's village; but people's names and still more fanciful inventions are not uncommon.

The class describes the method, putting it in some established category of methods that work in similar ways. Methods in the simplest category omit this second name and use a simple two-part name.

The stage indicates the number of bells, using unique terminology:

Bells	Stage name
3	Singles
5	Doubles
7	Triples
9	Caters
11	Cinques (pronounced sinks)

Bells	Stage name
4	Minimus
6	Minor
8	Major
10	Royal
12	Maximus

As can be seen, there are different naming systems for even- and odd-bell stages. The odd-bell stage names refer to the number of possible swaps that can be made from row to row; in caters and cinques can be seen the French numbers quatre and cinq while the stage name for three-bell ringing is indeed "singles". Higher odd-bell stages follow the same pattern (sextuples, septuples, etc.) while higher even-bell stages have more prosaic names: fourteen, sixteen, etc.).

Note that the names refer to the number of bells being permuted, which is not necessarily the same as the number being rung: for it is typical to ring triples methods not on seven bells but on eight, with the tenor covering: only the seven highest bells permute; the eighth and lowest bell is simply rung last in every row. So likewise with caters, usually rung on ten bells, and other higher odd-bell stages.

Put together, this system gives method names sound that is evocative, musical, and quaint: Kent Treble Bob Major, Grandsire Caters, Erin Triples, Chartres Delight Royal, Percy's Tea Strainer Treble Place Major, Titanic Cinques and so forth.

== "Performances" ==
A short composition, lasting perhaps only a few hundred changes, is called a touch, which got its name from the 16th-century expression a "touch" of music, meaning "a brief piece of instrumental music".; However many ringers look forward to the greater challenge of a quarter peal (about 1,250 changes) or a peal (about 5,000 changes), which is referred to as a "Performance".

This number derives from the great 17th-century quest to ring a full extent on seven bells; 7 factorial is 5,040. Sturdier bell frames and more clearly understood methods make the task easier today, but a peal still needs about 3 hours of labor and concentration.

Most ringers follow the definition of a peal as regulated by the Central Council. This requires a minimum of only 5,000 changes where major or a higher stage is being rung, but demands at least the full 5,040 changes on lower stages. For triples, this ensures at least a full extent; for lower stages a full extent falls well short of the goal and ringers must complete several full extents to reach 5,040 (working out mathematically to at least 7 extents on six bells, at least 42 on five, or at least 210 on four; three-bell peals are not recognised by the Central Council).

To qualify as a peal, the ringing must meet a number of other key criteria. Among other things, each bell must be rung continuously by the same person; a ringing band cannot swap in a person to give ringers an occasional break. Likewise the ringing must be done entirely from memory; ringers cannot consult the method's blue line nor can the conductor (who must be one of the ringers) have a written reminder of the composition.

More commonly rung is the quarter peal, typically consisting of 1,260 changes and typically taking 45 minutes to ring. Half peals are more rarely rung, but have been known. One example is in Buckfast Abbey in Devon, where there are two half peal boards.

Relationship of extents and peals
Changing bells	Stage name	Unique changes possible (extent)
5	Doubles	120 (42 extents = peal)
6	Minor	720 (7 extents = peal)
7	Triples	5040 (1 extent = peal)
8	Major	40320 (8 peals = extent)

== See also ==
- Campanology
- Change ringing
- Change ringing software
- Siteswap
