= Plain hunt =

In method ringing, a branch of change ringing, the ringing pattern known as plain hunt is the simplest method of generating continuously changing sequences, and is a fundamental building-block of method ringing.

== Explanation ==
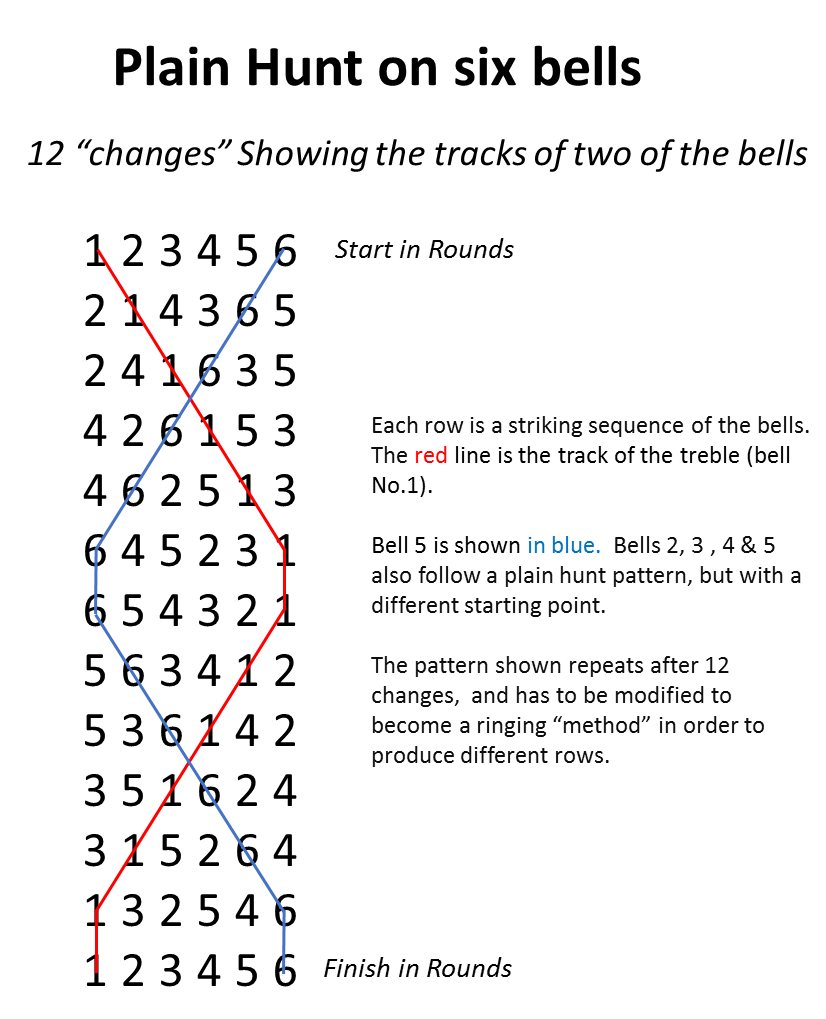
The "diagram" of change ringing plain hunt on six bells. Two bells are shown.

Plain hunting consists of a linear undeviating course of a bell between the first and last places in the striking order, with two strikes in the first and last position to enable a turn-around.

On eight bells this is shown in the accompanying diagram below, where all the bells are plain hunting. The bells are written out in their striking order, and each sequence is a "change":

Thus each bell moves one position at each succeeding change, unless they reach the first or last position, when they remain there for two changes then proceed to the other end of the sequence.

This simple rule can be extended to any number of bells, so that on 12 bells for instance, 24 unique changes can be obtained.

Example – plain hunt on eight bells

1 2 3 4 5 6 7 8- start in rounds (rounds is the descending sequence of bells)
2 1 4 3 6 5 8 7
2 4 1 6 3 8 5 7
4 2 6 1 8 3 7 5
4 6 2 8 1 7 3 5
6 4 8 2 7 1 5 3
6 8 4 7 2 5 1 3
8 6 7 4 5 2 3 1
8 7 6 5 4 3 2 1 – reverse rounds
7 8 5 6 3 4 1 2
7 5 8 3 6 1 4 2
5 7 3 8 1 6 2 4
5 3 7 1 8 2 6 4
3 5 1 7 2 8 4 6
3 1 5 2 7 4 8 6
1 3 2 5 4 7 6 8
1 2 3 4 5 6 7 8 – finish in rounds

=== Limitations ===
Plain hunt is limited to a small number of possible different changes, which is numerically equal to twice the number of bells that are hunting. However, by introducing deviations from the plain hunt, by causing some of the bells to change their relationship to the others, change ringing "methods" were developed. These allow a large range of possible different changes to be rung; even to the extent of the full factorial sequence of changes.

== Used as a method building block ==
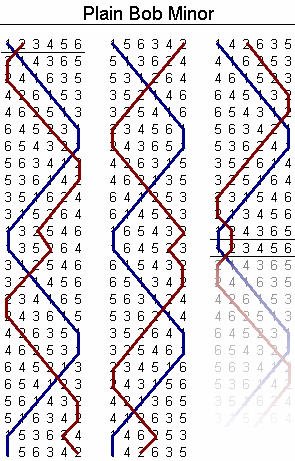
60 changes of the ringing method known as Plain Bob Minor. This has large blocks of plain hunting, and deviations from plain hunt only when bell no. 1 is the first.

The diagram on the right shows how plain hunt is used as a building-block in other ringing methods.

Bell number 1 is always plain hunting (shown in blue), and the other bells plain hunt but they change their pattern when bell number 1 is the first bell in the sequence. An example of one bell which is deviating from plain hunt is shown in red.

This variation on plain hunt means that up to 60 changes can be rung without repetition in this case.

There are thousands of ringing methods which incorporate blocks of plain hunt, and are only distinguished by different deviations at set points. These deviations define a particular ringing method in change ringing.
