= Change ringing =

Art of ringing a set of bells in mathematical patterns

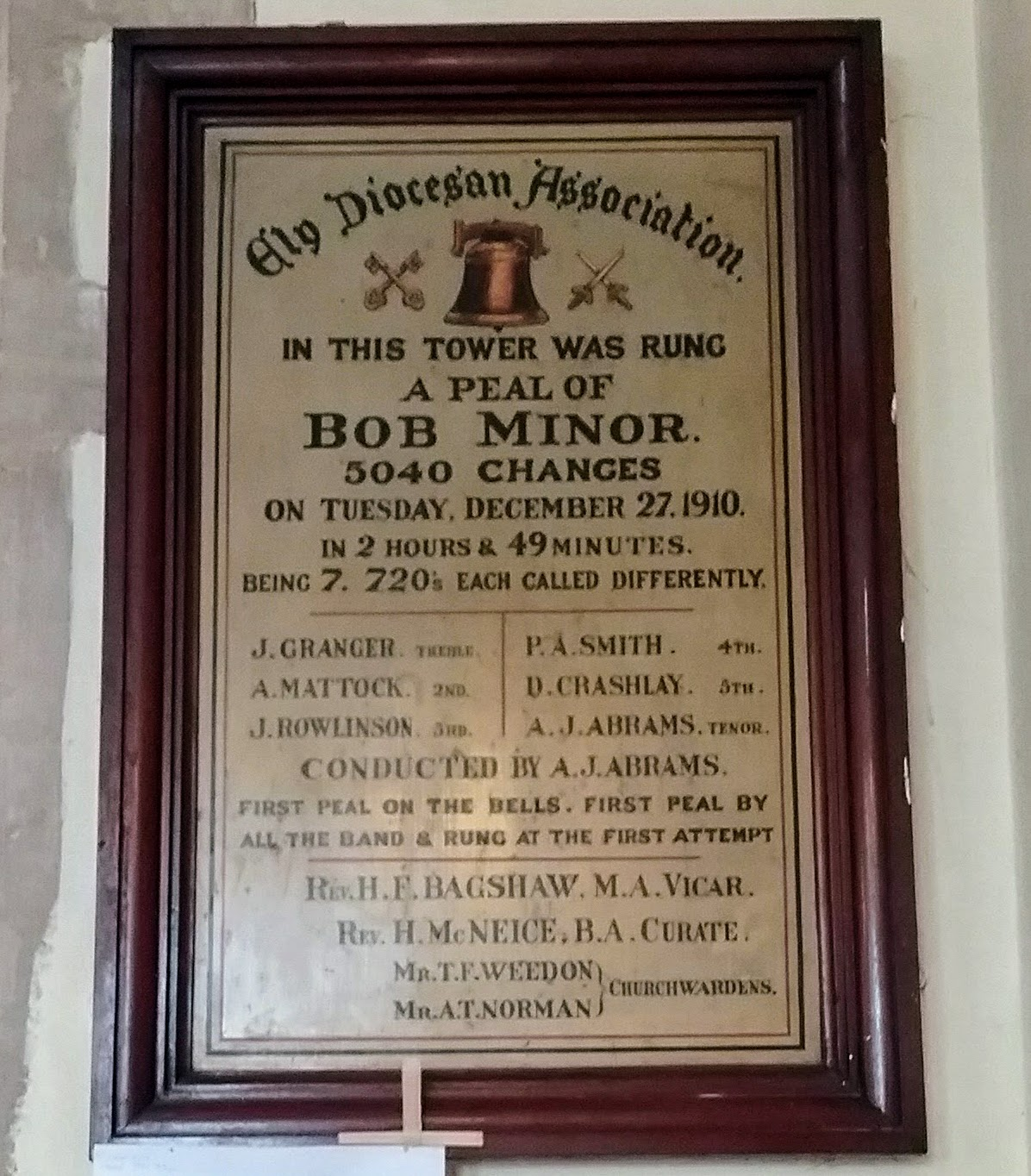
Peal board at St Peter and St Paul Church, Chatteris, Cambridgeshire, commemorating the ringing of a peal in 1910; 5,040 changes were rung in two hours and forty-nine minutes.

Change ringing is the art of ringing a set of tuned bells in a tightly controlled manner to produce precise variations in their successive striking sequences, known as "changes". This can be by method ringing in which the ringers commit to memory the rules for generating each change, or by call changes, where the ringers are instructed how to generate each change by a conductor. This creates a form of bell music which cannot be discerned as a conventional melody, but is a series of mathematical sequences.

Change ringing originated following the invention of English full-circle tower bell ringing in the early 17th century, when bell ringers found that swinging a bell through a much larger arc than that required for swing-chiming gave control over the time between successive strikes of the clapper. Ordinarily a bell will swing through a small arc only at a set speed governed by its size and shape in the nature of a simple pendulum, but by swinging through a larger arc approaching a full circle, control of the strike interval can be exercised by the ringer. This culminated in the technique of full circle ringing, which enabled ringers to independently change the speeds of their individual bells accurately to combine in ringing different mathematical permutations, known as "changes".

Speed control of a tower bell is exerted by the ringer only when each bell is mouth upwards and moving slowly near the balance point; this constraint and the intricate rope manipulation involved normally requires that each bell have its own ringer. The considerable weights of full-circle tower bells also means they cannot be easily stopped or started and the practical change of interval between successive strikes is limited. This places limitations on the rules for generating easily-rung changes; each bell must strike once in each change, and its position of striking in successive changes can only change by one place.

Change ringing is practised worldwide, but it is by far most common on church bells in English churches, where it first developed. Change ringing is also performed on handbells, where conventionally each ringer holds two bells, and chimed on carillons and chimes of bells, though these are more commonly used to play conventional melodies.

== Technique and physics ==
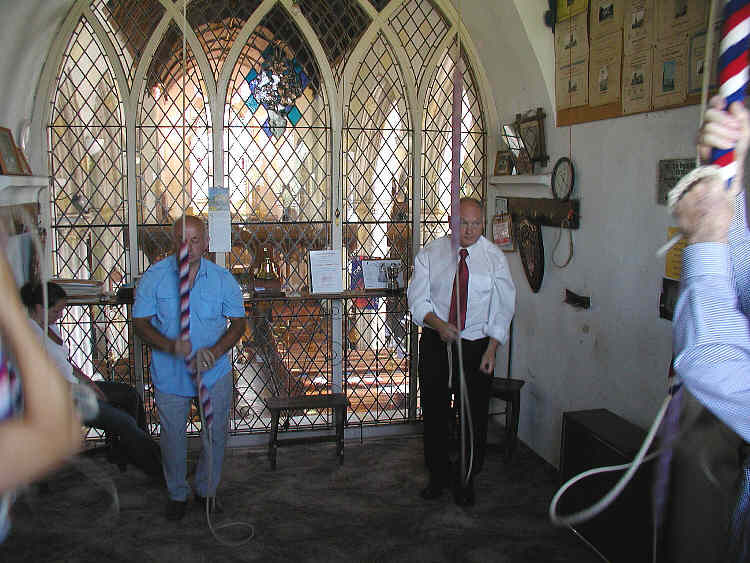
Bell ringing at St Mary and St Gabriel's Church, Stoke Gabriel, Devon, England. This is in the "ringing chamber".

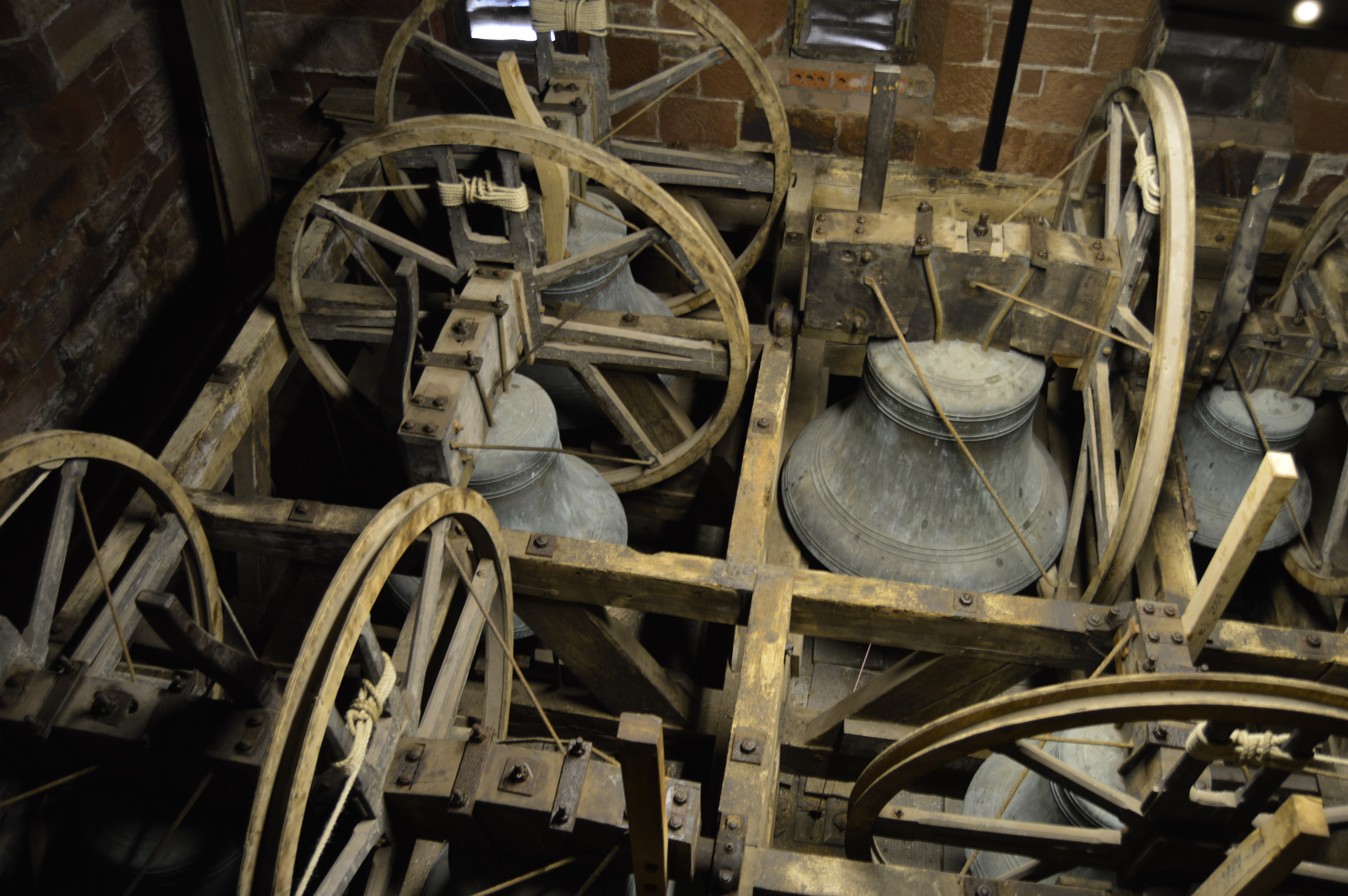
The bells of St Bees Priory in Cumbria shown in the "down" position, where they are normally left between ringing sessions. This is in the "bell chamber".

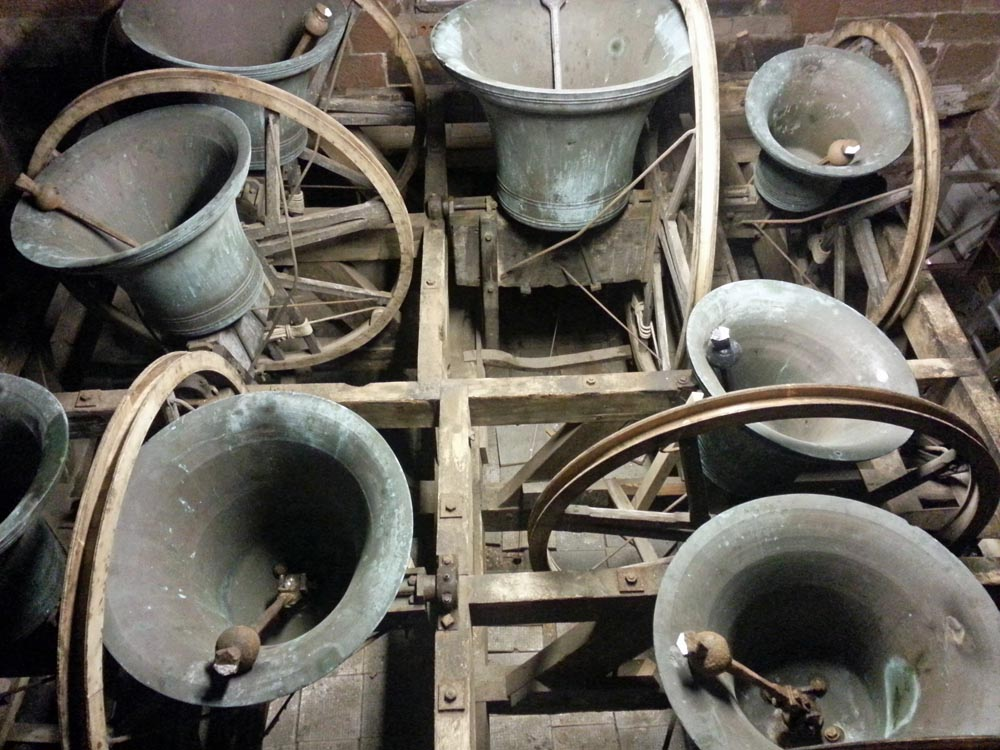
The bells of St Bees Priory shown in the "up" position. When being rung they swing through a full circle from mouth upwards round to mouth upwards, and then back again.

6 bells being rung to call changes in All Saints' Church, Kirkbymoorside, in North Yorkshire

Today, some towers have as many as sixteen bells that can be rung together, though six or eight bells are more common. The highest pitch bell is known as the treble, and the lowest is the tenor. In some towers, a bell larger than a tenor that is present would be called a bourdon. The bourdon is not part of the change ringing peal; it is hung from a pivoted beam. For convenience, the bells are referred to by number, with the treble being number 1 and the other bells numbered by their pitch—2, 3, 4, etc.—sequentially down the scale. (This system often seems counter-intuitive to musicians, who are used to a numbering that ascends with pitch.) The bells are usually tuned to a diatonic major scale, with the tenor bell being the tonic (or key) note of the scale. Some towers contain additional bells so that different subsets of the full number can be rung, still to a diatonic scale. For instance, many 12-bell towers have a flat sixth, which if rung instead of the normal number 6 bell allows 2 to 9 to be rung as light diatonic octave; other variations are also possible.

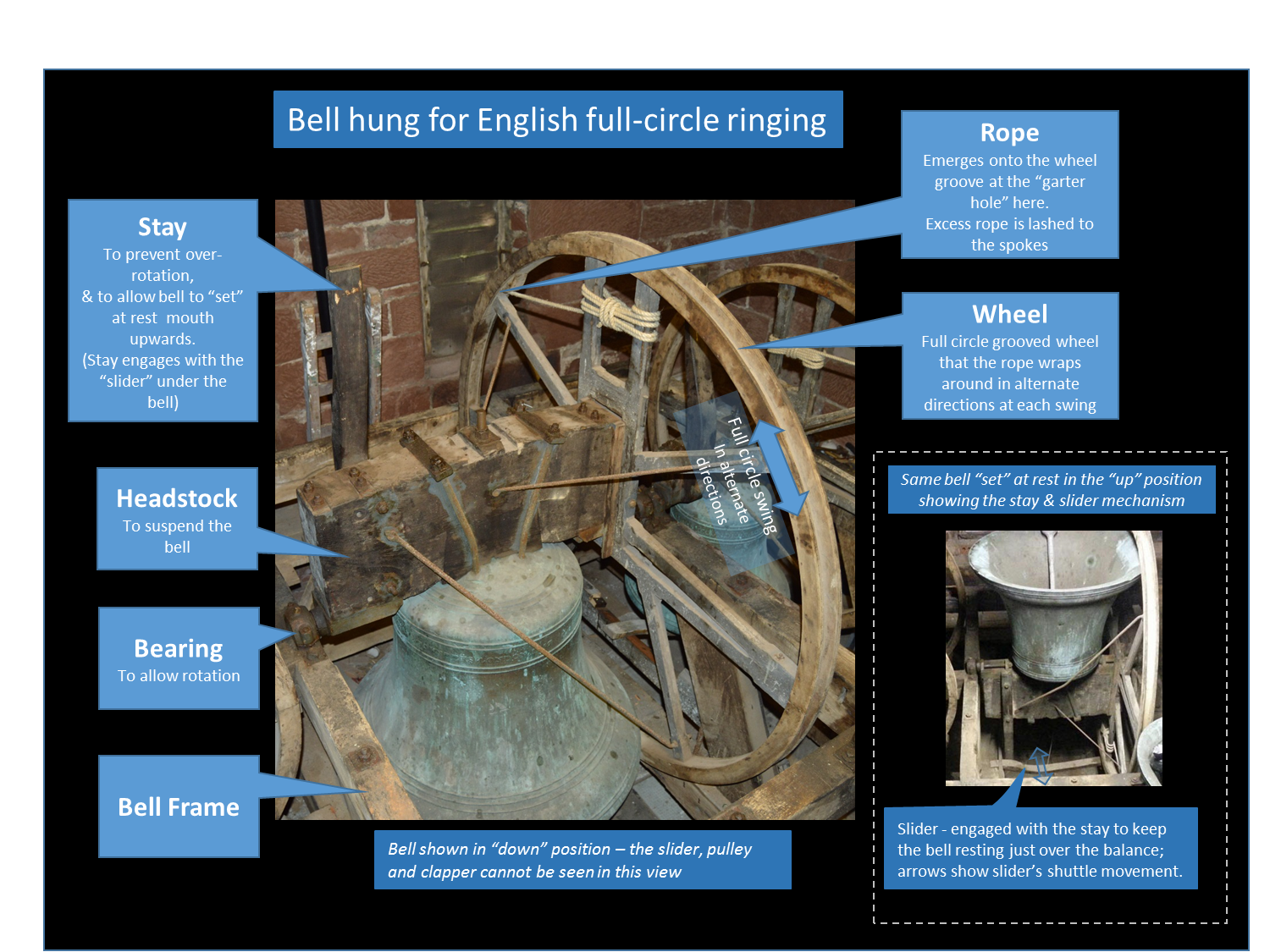
Mechanism of a bell hung for English full-circle ringing

The bells in a tower reside in the bell chamber or belfry usually with louvred windows to enable the sound to escape.

The bells are mounted within a bellframe of steel or wood. Each bell is suspended from a headstock fitted on trunnions (plain or non-friction bearings) mounted to the belfry framework so that the bell assembly can rotate. When stationary in the down position, the centre of mass of the bell and clapper is appreciably below the centreline of the trunnion supports, giving a pendulous effect to the assembly, and this dynamic is controlled by the ringer's rope. The headstock is fitted with a wooden stay, which, in conjunction with a slider, limits maximum rotational movement to a little less than 370 degrees. To the headstock a large wooden wheel is fitted and to which a rope is attached. The rope wraps and unwraps on the rim of the wheel as the bell rotates backwards and forwards. This is full circle ringing and quite different from fixed or limited motion bells, which chime. Within the bell the clapper is constrained to swing in the direction that the bell swings. The clapper is a rigid steel or wrought iron bar with a large ball to strike the bell. The thickest part of the mouth of bell is called the soundbow and it is against this that the ball strikes. Beyond the ball is a flight, which controls the speed of the clapper. In very small bells this can be nearly as long as the rest of the clapper.

Below the bell chamber there may be one or more sound chambers, (one of which is likely to house the clock mechanism if the church has one) and through which the rope passes before it drops into the ringing chamber or room. Typically, the rope's length is such that it falls close to or on to the floor of the ringing chamber. About 5 feet (1.5 m) from the floor, the rope has a woollen grip called the sally (usually around 4 feet (1.2 m) long) while the lower end of the rope is doubled over to form an easily held tail-end.

Unattended bells are normally left hanging in the normal ("down") position, but prior to being rung, the bells are rung up. In the down position, the bells are safe if a person touches them or pulls a rope. A bell that is up is dangerous to be near, and only competent ringers should ever contemplate entering a bell chamber or touching a rope when the bells are up. To raise a bell, the ringer pulls on the rope and starts the bell swinging. Each time the bell swings the ringer adds a little more energy to the system, similar to pushing a child's swing. Eventually there is enough energy for the bell to swing right up and be left over-centre just beyond the balance point with the stay resting against the slider to hold the bell in position, ready to be rung.

Bellringers typically stand in a circle around the ringing chamber, each managing one rope. Bells and their attendant ropes are so mounted that the ropes are pulled in a circular sequence, usually clockwise, starting with the lightest (treble) bell and descending to the heaviest (tenor). To ring the bell, the ringer first pulls the sally towards the floor, upsetting the bell's balance and swinging it on its bearings. As the bell swings downwards the rope unwinds from the wheel and the ringer adds enough pull to counteract friction and air resistance. The bell winds the rope back onto the other side of the wheel as it rises and the ringer can slow (or check) the rise of the bell if required.

The rope is attached to one side of the wheel so that a different amount of rope is wound on and off as it swings to and fro. The first stroke is the handstroke with a small amount of rope on the wheel. The ringer pulls on the sally and when the bell swings up it draws up more rope onto the wheel and the sally rises to, or beyond, the ceiling. The ringer keeps hold of the tail-end of the rope to control the bell. After a controlled pause with the bell, on or close to its balancing point, the ringer rings the backstroke by pulling the tail-end, causing the bell to swing back towards its starting position. As the sally rises, the ringer catches it to pause the bell at its balance position.

In English-style ringing the bell is rung up such that the clapper is resting on the lower edge of the bell when the bell is on the stay. During each swing, the clapper travels faster than the bell, eventually striking the soundbow and making the bell sound. The bell speaks roughly when horizontal as it rises, thus projecting the sound outwards. The clapper rebounds very slightly, allowing the bell to ring. At the balance point, the clapper passes over the top and rests against the soundbow.

In change ringing where the order the bells are struck in is constantly altered, it is necessary to time the swing so that this strike occurs with precise positioning within the overall pattern. Precision of striking is important at all times. To ring quickly, the bell must not complete the full 360 degrees before swinging back in the opposite direction; while ringing slowly, the ringer waits with the bell held at the balance, before allowing it to swing back. To achieve this, the ringer must work with the bell's momentum, applying just the right amount of effort during the pull that the bell swings as far as required and no further. This allows two adjacent bells to reverse positions, the quicker bell passing the slower bell to establish a new pattern. Although ringing up certainly involves some physical exertion, actual ringing should rely more on practised skill than mere brute force. Even the smallest bell in a tower is much heavier than the person ringing it. The heaviest bell hung for full-circle ringing is in Liverpool Cathedral and weighs 82 long cwt 0 qr 11 lb (9,195 lb or 4,171 kg). Despite this colossal weight, it can be safely rung by one (experienced) ringer.

(Whilst heavier bells exist – for example Big Ben – they are generally only chimed, either by swinging the bell slightly or having the bell hung dead and using a mechanical hammer.)

== Changes ==
The simplest way to sound a ring of bells is by ringing rounds. This is a repeated sequence of bells descending from the highest to lowest note, which is from the lightest to the heaviest bell. This was the original sequence used before change ringing was developed, and change ringing always starts and ends with this sequence.

Two forms of ringing changes have developed;

1. Call changes: where the conductor of the ringing commands each change.
2. Method ringing: where after a word of command to start, the changes are rung from memory by the ringers.

=== Call change ringing ===
Most ringers begin their ringing career with call change ringing; they can thus concentrate on learning the physical skills needed to handle their bells without needing to worry about "methods". There are also many towers where experienced ringers practise call change ringing as an art in its own right (and even exclusively), particularly in the English county of Devon.

The technique was probably developed in the early 17th century in the early days of change ringing.

Call change ringing requires one ringer to give commands to change the order of the bells, as distinct from method ringing, where the ringers memorise the course of bells as part of a continuous pattern.

==== Call change instructions ====
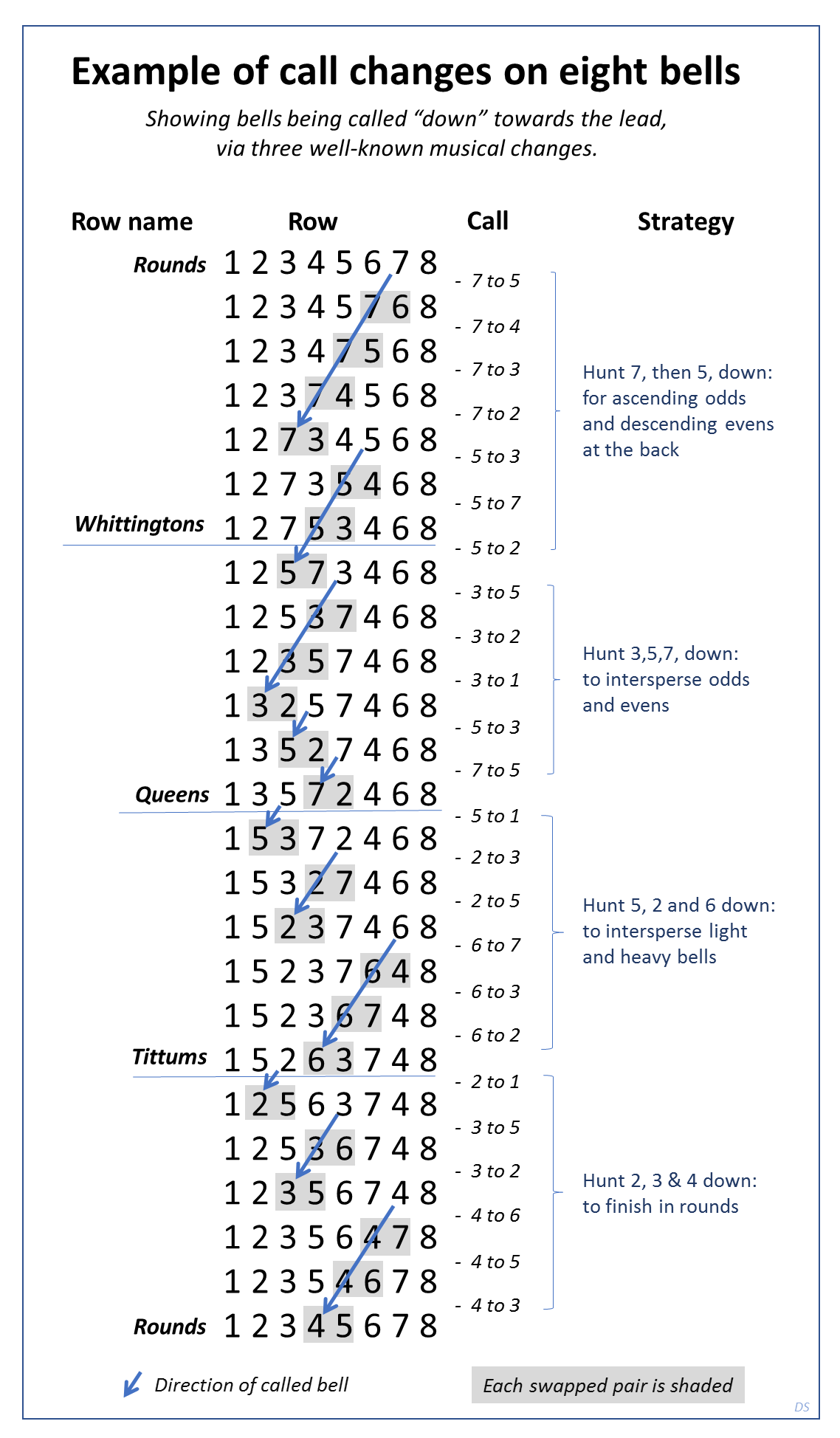
Call changes on eight bells, with the musical rows Whittingtons, Queens and Tittums. This is not a call change 'peal', but an example of calling changes for a short period for musical effect.

In call change ringing each different sequence of the bells, known as a "row", is specifically called out by one ringer, the "conductor", who instructs the other ringers how to change their bells' places from row to row. This command is known as a "call".

The change is made at the next "handstroke" (when the sally on the bell rope is pulled), after the call. In calling, the conductor usually has a strategy or plan to achieve the desired progression of rows, rather than remembering each call, and an example of these is shown in the example on eight bells. Conductors can space out the calls at will, but each row is normally struck twice at least because of the difficulty of calling continuous changes.

Calls are usually of the form "X to (or after) Y" or "X and Y"; in which X and Y refer to two of the bells by their physical numbers in the tower (not by their positions in the row). All cause two bells to swap. The first form is used for calling up and calling down, and the second form swaps the two bells mentioned.

As an example of calling up and down, consider the following sequence of rows, and the calls a conductor would use to call them:

Row	Conductor's intent	Call, if calling Up	Call, if calling Down	Call if swapping
1,2,3,4,5,6	to swap bells 2 and 3	"2 to 3"	"3 to 1"	"2 and 3"
1,3,2,4,5,6	to swap bells 4 and 5	"4 to 5"	"5 to 2"	"4 and 5"
1,3,2,5,4,6	to swap bells 2 and 5	"2 to 5"	"5 to 3"	"2 and 5"
1,3,5,2,4,6	to swap bells 1 and 3	"1 to 3"	"3 to lead"	"1 and 3"
3,1,5,2,4,6				

Thus it can be seen how these ways of calling differ:

- In calling up, The first-called bell moves after the second called bell.
- In calling down, The first-called bell moves after the second called bell.
- In Swapping, the bells simply swap position

In all cases, the ringer of the bell immediately above (behind) the swapping pair must also be alert, as that bell follows a new bell after the swap. Rarer forms of change calling may name just one of the moving bells, call the moving bell by position rather than number, or call out the full change.

The example on the right shows called changes eight bells being called using the "down" system. The sequence of calls shown gives three well-known musical rows, which are Whittingtons, Queens, and Tittums.

- Whittingtons – bell 1 and 2 stay in place, other bells ascend the odds and descend the evens
- Queens – descending odd bells then descending evens
- Tittums – interspersed light and heavy bells, giving a "tee-tum, tee-tum...." effect.

=== Method ringing ===
Method ringing is the continuously changing form of change ringing, and gets its name from the use of a particular method to generate the changes.

After starting in repetitive rounds, at a given command, the ringers vary the bells' order, to produce a series of distinct sequences known as rows or changes. In this way permutation of the bells' striking order proceeds. For example 123456 can become 214365 in the next sequence.

The method is committed to memory by each ringer, so that only a few commands are given by the ringer in charge (the conductor). Learning the method does not consist of memorising the individual sequences, but using a variety of techniques such as:

1. Memorising the path of the bell, not the numbers of the bells it strikes after. This can be by visualising a tracking line in a method diagram
2. or by breaking the line into small "work" units which are joined together.
3. and looking for visual signposts, such as when the ringer's bell crosses with another particular bell.

There are thousands of different methods, of which two methods on six bells are explained in detail below.

==== Plain hunt ====
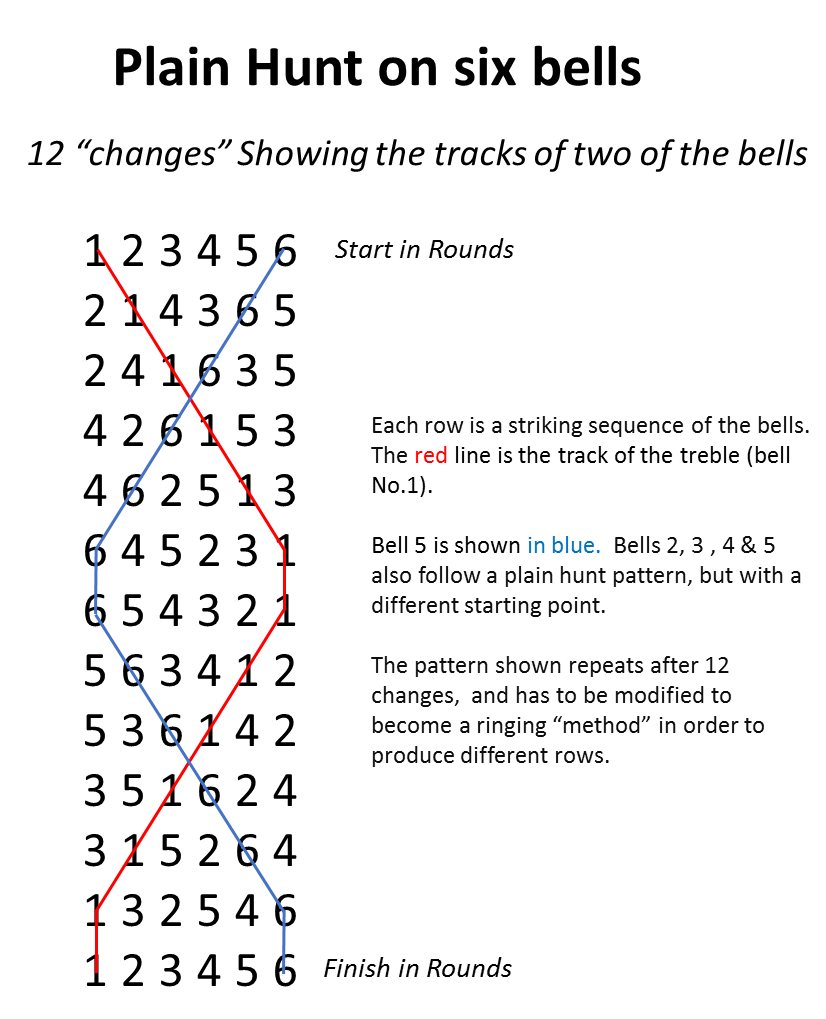
The "diagram" of change ringing plain hunt on six bells. Two bells are shown.

In method ringing, plain hunt is the simplest form of generating changing permutations in a continuous fashion, and is a fundamental building-block of many change ringing methods. The accompanying diagram shows plain hunt on six bells. The course of two bells only are shown for clarity. Each row in the diagram shows the order of striking after each change.

Plain hunt consists of a plain undeviating course of a bell between the first and last places in the striking order, by moving a place in the sequence at each change, but with two strikes in the first and last position to enable a turn-around as the internal bells change over.

Thus each bell moves one position at each succeeding change, unless they reach the first or last position, where they remain for two changes then proceed to the other end of the sequence. All of the bells are doing this at every change, without any words of command.

This simple rule can be extended to any number of bells, however it repeats the sequence after twice the number of bells hunting.

==== Plain Bob ====
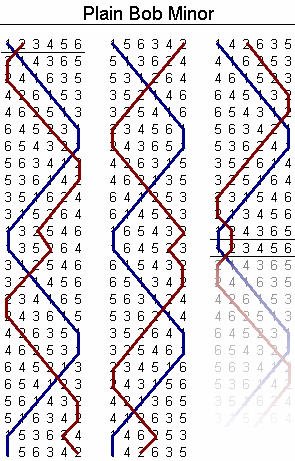
The plain course of Plain Bob Minor, shown in red. Note that, for clarity, the row at the bottom of each column is repeated at the top of the next.

Plain Bob Minor
Plain Bob Minor played using synthesised bell sounds. The bells start ringing rounds followed by a plain course of Plain Bob Minor (60 of the 720 changes that are possible on six bells) and finish in rounds again.

To enable a greater number of changes to be rung without repetition, more advanced methods were developed, many based upon the plain hunt. "Plain Bob" is one of the oldest and simplest of these, and is shown as an example above.

A "plain course" of plain bob minor is shown in diagrammatic form, which has the characteristics:

1. all the bells plain hunt, until the treble bell is first, and depending where they are in the pattern, they
2. perform "dodges" in the 3-4 position
3. or perform dodges in the 5-6 positions
4. or sit for two blows if they are just above the treble, then go first again.

The red bell track shows the order of "works", which are deviations from the plain hunt.

1. 3/4 down dodge
2. 5/6 down dodge
3. 5/6 up dodge
4. 3/4 up dodge
5. make 2nds place.

And then it repeats. Each bells starts at a different place in this cyclical order. A dodge means just that: two bells dodge round each other, thus changing their relationship to the treble, and giving rise to different changes.

The plain bob pattern can be extended beyond the constraints of the plain course of 60 changes, to the full unique 720 changes possible (this is 6 factorial on 6 bells, which is 1×2×3×4×5×6 = 720 changes). To do this, at set points in the sequences one of the ringers, called the "conductor" calls out commands such as "bob" or "single", which introduce further variations. The conductor follows a "composition" which they have to commit to memory. This enables the other ringers to produce large numbers of unique changes without memorising huge quantities of data, without any written prompts.

Ringers can also ring different methods, with different "works" on different numbers of bells – so there is a huge variety of ways of ringing changes in method ringing.

== Peals and quarter peals ==
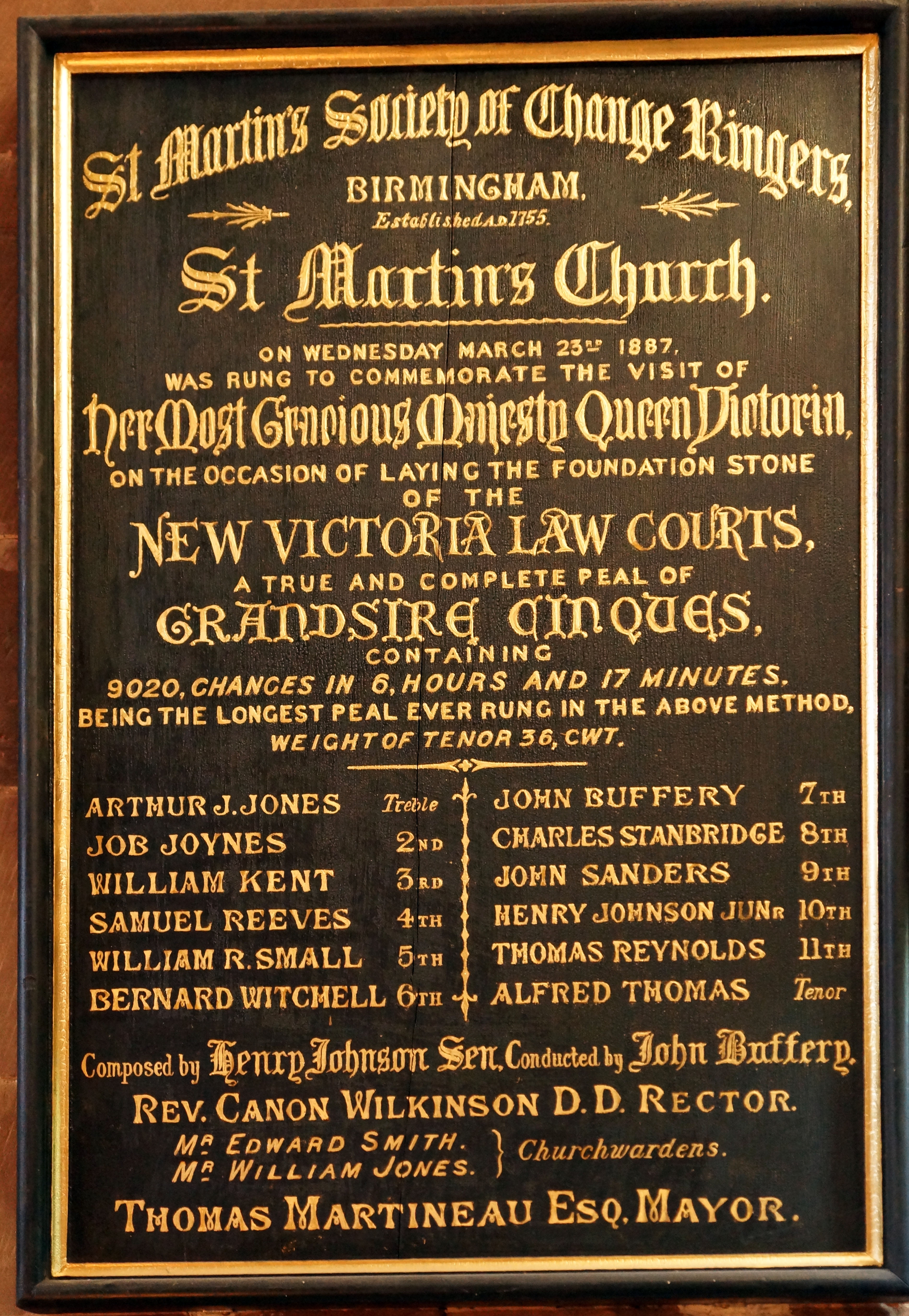
A peal board at St Martin in the Bull Ring, Birmingham, recording the details of a notable peal. Thousands of these boards exist in change-ringing belfries.

For some people, the ultimate goal of this system is to ring all the permutations, to ring a tower's bells in every possible order without repeating – what is called an extent (or sometimes, formerly, a full peal). The feasibility of this depends on how many bells are involved: if a tower has n bells, they have n! (read factorial) possible permutations, a number that becomes quite large as n grows.

For example, while six bells have 720 permutations, eight bells have 40,320; furthermore, 10! = 3,628,800, and 12! = 479,001,600. Estimating two seconds for each change (a reasonable pace), one finds that while an extent on six bells can be accomplished in half an hour, an extent on eight bells should take nearly twenty-two and a half hours. (When in 1963 ringers in Loughborough became the only band in history to achieve this feat on tower bells, it took them just under 18 hours.) An extent on 12 bells would take over thirty years.

Since extents are obviously not always practicable, ringers more often undertake shorter performances. Such ringing starts and ends with rounds, having meanwhile visited only a subset of the available permutations; but truth is still considered essential — no row can ever be repeated; to do so would make the ringing false. A peal is an extended performance; it must comprise at least 5000 changes (but 5040 on 7 bells, i.e. an extent). A performance of 1250 changes likewise makes a quarter peal (quarter for short); a peal or a quarter tends to last about three hours or 45 minutes, respectively.

== Changes on handbells ==
Change ringing can also be performed on handbells, and is quite popular in its own right. Many record-length peals, including the longest peal ever rung, are by handbell ringers.

Normally each ringer has a bell in each hand and sit or stand in a circle (like tower ringers). The tower bell terms of handstroke and backstroke are retained, referring to an upwards and downwards ring of the bell respectively; and as in towers, the ringing proceeds in alternate rows of handstroke and backstroke.

Occasionally, a technique called lapping, or cross and stretch is used. Ringers stand or sit in a straight line at a single convenient table on which the bells are placed. They pick up a bell each time they ring it, and then put it down. As the bell sequence changes, however, the ringers physically swap the bells accordingly—so the bells move up and down the table and each row is rung in strict sequence from right to left. Ringers in cross and stretch thus do not have responsibility for their own personal bell, but handle each as it comes.

Some handbell change ringers practice a hybrid of these two methods, known as body ringing: ringers standing in a line each hold one bell, exchanging places in the line so that the changes sound correctly when the bells are rung in sequence from right to left.

== History and modern culture ==
Change ringing as we know it today emerged in England in the 17th century. To that era we can trace the origins of the earliest ringing societies, such as the Lincoln Cathedral Guild, which claims to date to 1612 or the Antient [sic] Society of Ringers of St Stephen in Bristol, which was founded in 1620 and lasted as a ringing society until the late 19th century. The recreation began to flourish in earnest in the Restoration era; an important milestone in the development of method ringing as a careful science was the 1668 publication by Richard Duckworth and Fabian Stedman of their book Tintinnalogia, which promised in its subtitle to lay down "plain and easie Rules for Ringing all sorts of Plain Changes". Stedman followed this in 1677 with another famous early guide, Campanalogia.

Throughout the years since, the group theoretical underpinnings of change ringing have been pursued by mathematicians. "Changes" can be viewed as permutations; sets of permutations constitute mathematical groups, which in turn can be depicted via so-called Cayley graphs, which in turn can be mapped onto polyhedra.

Bells have been installed in towers around the world and many rings in the British Isles have been augmented to ten, twelve, fourteen, or even sixteen bells. Today change ringing is, particularly in England, a popular and commonplace sound, often issuing from a church tower before or after a service or wedding. While on these everyday occasions the ringers must usually content themselves with shorter "touches", each lasting a few minutes, for special occasions they often attempt a quarter-peal or peal, lasting approximately 45 minutes or three hours respectively. If a peal attempt succeeds, towers sometimes mark the occasion with a peal board mounted on the wall of the ringing chamber; at St Peter Mancroft in Norwich there is one documenting what is generally considered to have been the first true peal: 5040 changes of Plain Bob Triples (a method still popular today), rung 2 May 1715. There is some evidence there may have been an earlier peal (also Plain Bob Triples), rung January 7, 1690 at St Sepulchre-without-Newgate in the City of London by the Ancient Society of College Youths. Today over 4000 peals are rung each year.

=== Organisation and extent ===
The Central Council of Church Bell Ringers, founded in 1891, is dedicated to representing change ringers around the world. Most regional and local ringing guilds are affiliated with the council. Its journal, The Ringing World, has been published weekly since 1911; in addition to news and features relating to bellringing and the bellringing community, it publishes records of achievements such as peals and quarter-peals. Ringers generally adhere to the Council's rules and definitions governing change ringing.

The Central Council, by means of its peal records, also keeps track of record length peals, both on tower bells and handbells. (The record for tower bells remains the 1963 Loughborough extent of Plain Bob Major [40,320 changes]; for handbells it was set in 2007 in Willingham, Cambridgeshire, with 72,000 changes of 100 different Treble Dodging Minor methods, taking just over 24 hours to ring) More importantly, perhaps, along with keeping track of the first peal ever rung in a method, the Central Council controls the naming of new methods: it generally allows the first band to ring a method to name it.

Much ringing is carried out by bands of ringers meeting at their local tower to ring its bells. For the sake of variety, though, many ringers like to take occasional trips to make a tower grab ringing the bells of a less familiar tower. The setting, the church architecture, the chance to ring more bells than usual, the bells' unique tone, their ease or difficulty of ringing, and sometimes even the unusual means of accessing the ringing chamber can all be part of the attraction. The traditional means of finding bell towers, and still the most popular way today, is the book (and now internet database) Dove's Guide for Church Bell Ringers.

As of 30 June 2018 there are 7,141 English style rings in ringable condition. The Netherlands, Belgium, Pakistan, India, and Spain have one each. The Windward Isles and the Isle of Man have 2 each. Canada and New Zealand 8 each. The Channel Isles 11. Africa as a continent has 13. Scotland 23, Ireland 38, USA 48, Australia 61 and Wales 227. The remaining 6,695 (94%) are in England (including three mobile rings). World-wide there are 985 unringable rings, 930 in England, 55 in Wales and 12 elsewhere.

=== Number of bells ===
Methods of change ringing are named for the number of working bells, or the bells that switch order within the change. It takes a pair to switch, and commonly the largest bell (the tenor) does not change place. For example, there may be six bells, only five of which work, allowing for only two pairs. A method of ringing for these bells would be called doubles. Doubles is the most common group of methods rung in the United Kingdom, since the majority of parish churches with bell towers in the UK are fitted with only six bells.

"Plain Bob Doubles" is a method rung on five bells whereas "Plain Bob Triples" is the same method rung on seven working bells.

There are two separate ways to refer to the number of bells. One way is used for even numbers, the other for an odd number.

Even numbers of bells
Number of bells	Name
4	Minimus
6	Minor
8	Major
10	Royal
12	Maximus

Odd numbers of bells
Number of bells	Name
3	Singles
5	Doubles
7	Triples
9	Caters
11	Cinques

The name for 9 bells is pronounced "kate-ers" and comes from the French "quatres". The name for 11 bells also comes from the French and is pronounced "sinks" cf. Cinque Ports.

The names refer to the number of bells which change places in each row. With three bells only one pair can change, and so it is singles. With seven bells there are clearly three pairs with the one left over not moving this row.

=== Named changes ===
Mathematical abstraction though each row may be, some rows do have a musical or melodic meaning to the listener. Over the years, a number of these have acquired names — they are named changes. Both the conductors directing call-change ringing and the composers coming up with plans for a bout of method ringing sometimes like to work their favourite named changes in. The table below lists some popular named changes on eight bells; many of these names are also applicable by extension on more or fewer bells.

Change	Name
12345678	Rounds
87654321	Back rounds or Reverse Rounds
13572468	Queens (an apocryphal story says it appealed to Elizabeth I)
15263748	Tittums (so named because of the ti-tum ti-tum sound it makes)

Such names are often humorous; for example, the sequence 14235 on five bells is called weasels because it is the tune of the refrain to the children's song Pop Goes the Weasel. This is particularly effective at the end of ringing down. The bells are in order, and so if not chimed leave a pause, the sequence becomes: 1..4..23.5 where a dot indicates a pause.

Called changes are listed at MAW Call Change Collection

=== Striking ===
Although neither call change nor method ringing produces conventional tunes, it is still the aim of the ringers to produce a pleasant sound. One of the most important aspects of this is good striking — not only should the bells never clash by sounding at the same moment, the bells should sound to a perfect rhythm, tapping out a steady beat.

It is the custom to leave a pause of one beat after every alternate row, i.e., after the ringing of each ‘backstroke’ row. This is called 'open handstroke' ringing (or open handstroke leading). In Devon, Cornwall and parts of Yorkshire, this custom is not followed when call-change ringing; instead the bells strike steadily without the pause. This latter custom is known as the closed-hand or cartwheel arrangement. However, for method ringing the universal practice is to ring with open handstrokes, even in the South West of England.

Striking competitions are held where various bands of ringers attempt to ring with their best striking. They are judged on their number of faults (striking errors); the band with the fewest faults wins. These competitions are organized on regional and national levels, being particularly popular among the call-change ringers of Devon where it is customary to include the quality of the rise and lower of the bells as part of the judging criteria. Competitions for method ringers usually start "off the stay"—i.e., the bells are rung up before the competition begins. At the annual National 12 Bell Striking Contest the bands are ringing methods and producing a different change approximately every 2.5 seconds, with a gap between bells of 0.21 seconds. To an expert ringer's ear at this level of competition a variation of a tenth of this would be discernible as a striking fault.

=== Sport ===
In 2016 readers of The Ringing World magazine wrote to insist that bell ringing was "an art and a sport", as demonstrated by regular "striking competitions". It was suggested that classification of change ringing as a sport by Sport England could save it from becoming obsolete. But the Central Council of Church Bell Ringers opposed the move, suggesting that it would jeopardise its relationship with church bodies, since bell ringing should be seen as part of Christian worship, not exercise. The council's president, Chris Mew, said: "Where is the glamour of the sports field and where are the David Beckhams of the belfry?"

=== Virtual ===
The COVID-19 pandemic made it impossible for bell ringers to assemble in belfries. Searching for alternative methods, in March 2020 two ringers from the USA developed software called Ringing Room that mimics the operation of ropes and bells, and permits people to ring together online, in a type of networked music performance. Various other online platforms for virtual change ringing have also been created, but Ringing Room is the most popular, with over 10,000 people joining in the first year.

In one Shropshire church, bells can be tied up with their sounds simulated by sensors, so ringers can practise in silence using Bluetooth headsets.

== In literature and television ==
The mystery novel The Nine Tailors by Dorothy L. Sayers (1934) contains a great deal of information on change-ringing. Her fictional detective, Lord Peter Wimsey, demonstrates his skill at ringing, and the solution to the central puzzle of the book rests in part upon his knowledge of the patterns of change ringing.

Connie Willis, who frequently references Sayers in To Say Nothing of the Dog (1997), features bell ringers in her earlier novel Doomsday Book (1992); a group of American women led by a Mrs. Taylor frequently appears practising for or ringing both handbells and changes.

The British television series Midsomer Murders aired an episode in the fifth season on a series of murders within a bell-ringing team, in "Ring Out Your Dead".

In the science-fiction novel Anathem by Neal Stephenson (2008) changes are rung in a cloistered monastery for mathematicians to signal different ceremonies.

== English bell-ringing terms ==
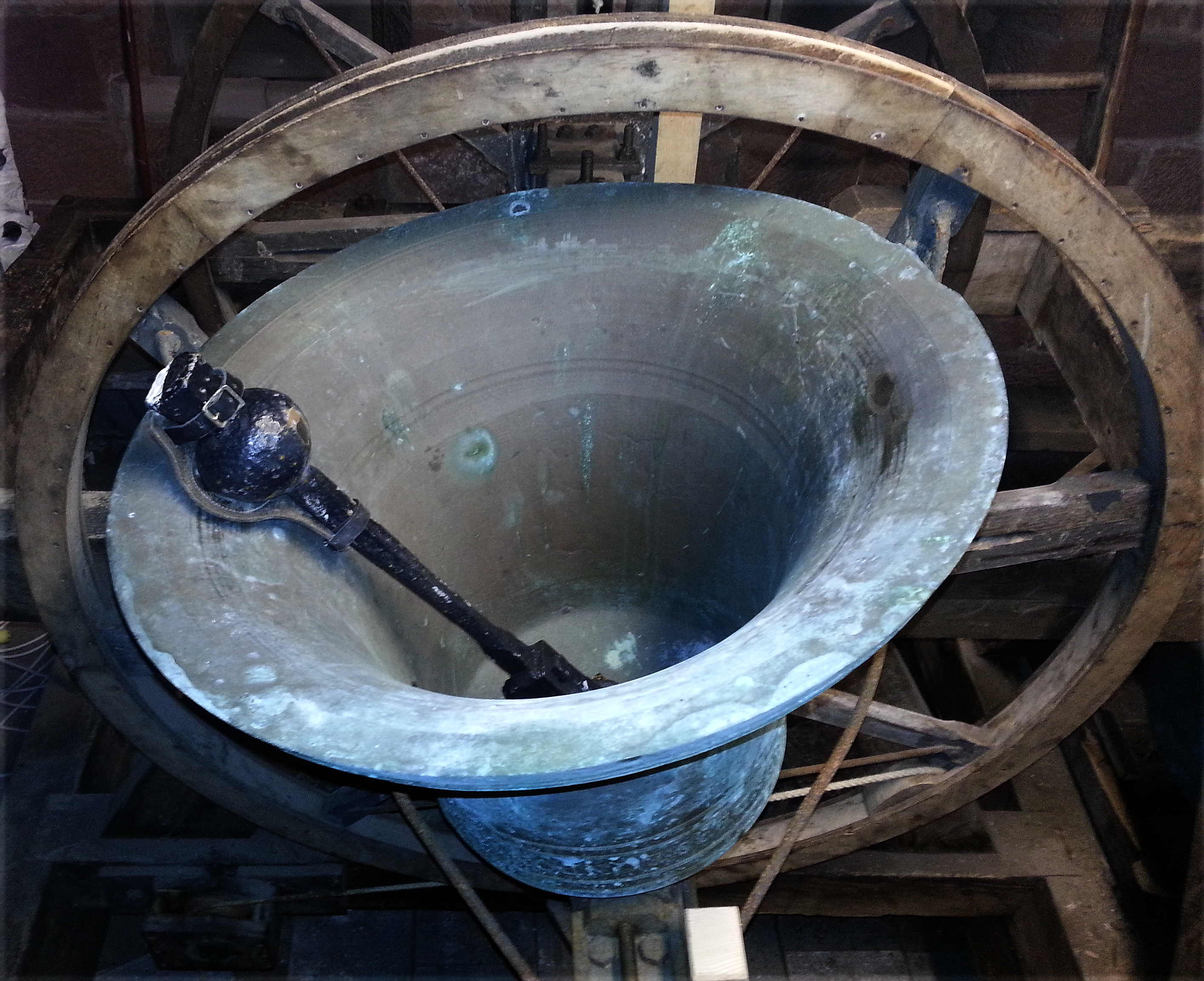
English style full circle bell with clapper half-muffled. A leather muffle is put over one side only of the clapper ball. This gives a loud strike, then a muffled strike alternately.

- Back – at or near last place in a change.
- Back bells – the heavier bells (so tend to limit the speed).
- Backstroke (or Backstroke home) – The part of a bell's cycle started by pulling on the tail end (rope end) in the tower, or with the bells raised in hand; also: the position at which the back bells come into rounds order at backstroke.
- Baldrick – the leather lined metal strap from which the clappers used to be hung.
- Band – a group of ringers for a given set of bells (or for a special purpose, e.g., a "peal band")
- Bearings – the load-bearing assembly on which the headstock (and so the whole bell) turns about its gudgeon pins. Modern hanging means the bell is hung on ball bearings, but were traditionally plain bearings.
- Bob – the commonest type of call in most methods or a class of plainmethod (in which either dodging takes place or some bells are not just hunting or place making); also can mean (usually called the "Bob place") the appropriate point in the method (e.g. a lead end) to modify the sequence of changes.
- Bob caller – someone who calls a touch, but does not check the ringing as a conductor would.
- Bristol start – starting to raise in peal by adding an extra bell each time.
- Bump the stay – allow the bell to swing over the balance, out of control, so the stay pushes the slider to its limit, stopping the bell.
- Cambridge – The right place surprise method, one of the standard eight, that is often the first learned.
- Canons – loops cast onto older bells' crowns.
- Cinques – (pronounced "sinks") methods for working eleven bells (possibly with a twelfth covering) the name deriving from the practice of swapping five pairs of bells.
- Clapper – the metal (usually cast iron) rod/hammer hung from a pivot below the crown of the bell, that strikes the soundbow of the bell when the bell stops moving.
- Clocking – causing a bell to sound while down by pulling a hammer against it (as a clock would) or by pulling the clapper against the side of the bell.
- Closed leads (also called cartwheeling) – handstroke changes follow backstroke changes with no handstroke gap (unlike open leads)
- Come round – return to rounds to end a touch (e.g. "come round at handstroke), or produce rounds prematurely.
- Cover – a bell (e.g. tenor) ringing at the end of every row, while the other bells ring a method.
- Delight – a treble bob method in which an internal place is made sometimes, but not every time, the treble is going from one dodge to another ("cross sections").
- Dodge – Changing direction for one stroke in bell ringing (although strictly a dodge is taking a retrograde step in the middle of a portion of hunting). Dodging practice is an exercise where two bells exchange places on every stroke, sometimes taught to aid learners change from call changes to plain hunt.
- Double method – a method where the structure is the same if reversed.
- Doubles – a method with five working bells, possibly with a sixth covering.
- Down – EITHER: when the bells are hanging with the mouth lowermost position, OR: moving towards the front (as in "hunting down").
- Extent – a touch where all possible changes are rung exactly once each; the number of such different rows is N factorial, where N is the number of bells.
- Firing- From rounds all the bells are rung at once for a few strokes before returning to rounds. Done at special occasions such as weddings or New Year.
- Fire out – to ring haphazardly, either because ringers accidentally try to ring at once, or deliberately for wedding ringing.
- Front – at or near the start of a row.
- Front bells – the smaller bells which are rung first in rounds.
- Garter hole – the hole in the wheel where the rope passes through.
- Handstroke – the stroke when the sally is gripped.
- Hunt – move one place at a time up or down (see plain hunt, treble bob hunt, etc.).
- Lead end – the change on which the treble is leading (ringing first) at its backstroke.
- Little Bob – a method in which the treble plain hunts between lead and a place short of the last place.
- Line – the sequence of places a bell rings in a method, or the diagram describing the method (the convention being that the treble line is shown in red while the others are blue).
- Method – an agreed/named sequence of changes that forms a round block, See plain course.
- Muffling For commemorative services such as funerals, memorial services and Remembrance Sunday, the bells are rung half-muffled with a leather pad on one side of the clapper. Bells are very rarely fully muffled with pads on both sides.
- Sally – the woollen bulge woven into the rope. It is both an indicator and a help with gripping.
- Slider – A device which allows the bell to go over the balance at each end of its swing, but not to over-rotate.
- Stay – a device that is attached to the headstock and works in conjunction with the slider.
- Tenor – the lowest pitched bell in the tower.
- Treble – the highest-pitched bell in the tower.
- Up – EITHER: when the bells are raised to the mouth uppermost position, OR: moving towards the back (as in "hunting up").

== See also ==
- The Australian and New Zealand Association of Bellringers
- Braid theory
- Change ringing software
- Grandsire
- John Taylor & Co
- Margery Sampson
- Steinhaus–Johnson–Trotter algorithm
- Veronese bellringing art
- Whitechapel Bell Foundry
