= Index of campanology articles =

Campanology is the scientific and musical study of bells. It encompasses the technology of bells – how they are cast, tuned, and rung – as well as the history, methods, and traditions of bellringing as an art. Articles related to campanology include:

== A–C ==
- American Bell Association International
- Ancient Society of College Youths
- Anton Brees Carillon Library
- The Australian and New Zealand Association of Bellringers
- Balangiga bells
- Bell
- Bell-cot
- Bell-gable
- Bell-ringer
- Bellfounding
- Bell cemetery
- Bell metal
- Bell of Good Luck
- Bell of King Seongdeok
- Bell pattern
- Bell tower
- Bell tower (wat)
- Bells of Notre-Dame de Paris
- Belfry (architecture)
- Bianzhong
- Big Ben
- Bilbie family
- Blagovest
- Bolognese bell ringing
- Bonshō
- Bourdon (bell)
- Call changes
- Campanology
- Campanas Quintana
- Canpanò
- Carillon
- Carillon Society of Australia
- Carillon Society of Britain and Ireland
- Central Council of Church Bell Ringers
- Change ringing
- Change ringing software
- Chime (bell instrument)
- Church bell
- Clock chime
- Company of Ringers of the Blessed Virgin Mary of Lincoln

== D–F ==
- De Gruytters carillon book
- Death knell
- Dōtaku
- Dove's Guide for Church Bell Ringers
- Electronic carillon
- Ellacombe apparatus
- Fonderie Paccard
- Freedom Bell
- Freedom Bell, American Legion
- Funeral toll

== G–I ==
- Ghanta
- Gillett & Johnston
- Glockenmuseum Stiftskirche Herrenberg
- Grandsire
- Grassmayr Bell Foundry
- Great Bell of Dhammazedi
- Great Tom (bell)
- The Guild of Carillonneurs in North America
- Guild of St Magnus
- Harmonic series (music)
- Hatch bell foundry

== J–L ==
- Japanese Peace Bell
- John Taylor & Co
- John Warner & Sons
- Justice Bell (Valley Forge)
- Juutila Foundry
- Kane (instrument)
- Liberty Bell
- Liberty Bell Memorial Museum
- Liberty Bell Museum
- List of bell ringing organizations
- List of carillons
- List of carillons in Belgium
- List of carillons in the United States
- List of carillons of the British Isles
- List of heaviest bells
- Louver

== M–O ==
- Maria Gloriosa
- Manchester Universities Guild of Change Ringers
- McShane Bell Foundry
- Meneely bell foundries
- Method ringing
- Mingun Bell
- Mini-ring
- Motorin family
- Musical tuning
- National Twelve-Bell Striking Contest
- Netherlands Carillon School
- The Nine Tailors
- North American Guild of Change Ringers
- Nottingham University Society of Change Ringers
- Olsen Nauen Bell Foundry
- Olympic Bell
- Overtone
- Oxford Diocesan Guild of Church Bell Ringers
- Oxford Society of Change Ringers
- Oxford University Society of Change Ringers

== P–R ==
- Plain hunt
- Peal
- Peal board
- Petersglocke
- Petit & Fritsen
- Pieter and François Hemony
- Pontificia Fonderia Marinelli
- Quarter bells
- Queen Fabiola Competition
- Rhodesian Independence Bell
- Ring of bells
- Ring Out, Wild Bells
- Ring Out Your Dead
- Royal Carillon School "Jef Denyn"
- Royal Eijsbouts bell foundry
- Rudhall of Gloucester
- Russian Orthodox bell ringing

== S–U ==
- The Sigismund Bell
- Society of Cambridge Youths
- Society of Royal Cumberland Youths
- Southampton University Guild of Change Ringers
- Standing bell
- Strike tone
- Suffolk Guild of Ringers
- Swan Bells
- Temple Bell (Boston)
- Tharrawaddy Min Bell
- Tsar Bell
- Turnbuckle
- University of Bristol Society of Change Ringers
- University of London Society of Change Ringers

== V–Z ==
- Vanden Gheyn family
- The Verdin Company
- Veronese bell ringing
- Welcome to the Sticks
- Westminster Quarters
- Whitechapel Bell Foundry
- World Carillon Federation
- World Peace Bell (Newport, Kentucky)
- World Peace Bell Association
- Zvonnitsa

== See also ==
- Index of music articles
