= List of bell ringing organizations =

The following is a list of bell ringing organizations

== List of change ringing organizations ==
Below is a list of all currently known ringing societies around the world. This includes societies affiliated to the Central Council of Church Bell Ringers – identified by the number of representative members:

- Aberystwyth University Society
- Aldenham College Youths
- Ancient Society of College Youths (4 CC Reps)
- Antient Free and Accepted Masons of England - Clavis Lodge No. 8585
- Army Guild of Bellringers
- The Australian and New Zealand Association of Bellringers (4 CC Reps)
- Bangor Student Society of Change Ringers
- Barnsley and District Society
- Barrow and District Society (1 CC Rep)
- Bath and Wells Diocesan Association (5 CC Reps)
- Bath University Society
- Bedfordshire Association (3 CC Reps)
- Beverley and District Society (2 CC Reps)
- Birmingham University Society
- Cambridge University Guild (2 CC Reps)
- Camping, Caravanning and Hostelling Ringing Society
- Canterbury Colleges Society
- Cardiff Students' Society
- Carlisle Diocesan Guild (2 CC Reps)
- Central European Association
- Chester Diocesan Guild (4 CC Reps)
- Clerical Ringers Guild
- Company of Ringers of the Blessed Virgin Mary of Lincoln
- Coventry Diocesan Guild (4 CC Reps)
- Derby Diocesan Association (4 CC Reps)
- Devon Association (2 CC Reps)
- Devonshire Guild (4 CC Reps)
- Doncaster and District Society
- Dordrecht Ringers Guild
- Dorset County Association (2 CC Reps)
- Durham and Newcastle Diocesan Association (4 CC Reps)
- Durham University Society (1 CC Rep)
- East Anglia University
- East Derbyshire & West Nottinghamshire Association (1 CC Reps)
- East Grinstead and District Guild (1 CC Reps)
- Edinburgh University Guild
- Ely Diocesan Association (4 CC Reps)
- Essex Association (5 CC Reps)
- Exeter University Change Ringing
- Faraday Guild
- Fire Service Guild
- Four Shires Guild (2 CC Reps)
- Framland Ringers Society
- Friends of Dorothy Society
- Geldrop, Guild of St Brigida Bellringers
- Gloucester and Bristol Diocesan Association (5 CC Reps)
- Guildford Diocesan Guild (4 CC Reps)
- Guild of Medical Ringers
- Guild of St Magnus
- Halifax Archdeaconry Guild
- Handbell Ringers of Great Britain
- Hereford Diocesan Guild (4 CC Reps)
- Hertford County Association (4 CC Reps)
- Huddersfield University Society
- Hull University Society
- Irish Association (2 CC Reps)
- Keele University Society
- Kent County Association (5 CC Reps)
- Ladies' Guild (3 CC Reps)
- Lancashire Association (5 CC Reps)
- Lancaster University Society
- Leeds University Society (1 CC Reps)
- Leicester Diocesan Guild (4 CC Reps)
- Leicester University Society
- Lichfield & Walsall Archdeaconry Society (3 CC Reps)
- Lincoln Diocesan Guild (4 CC Reps)
- Lincoln University Ringing
- Liverpool Universities Society (1 CC Reps)
- Llandaff and Monmouth Diocesan Association (3 CC Reps)
- Lundy Island Society of Change Ringers
- Manchester Universities Guild of Change Ringers
- Medway Universities
- Middlesex County Association & London Diocesan Guild (4 CC Reps)
- MIT Guild
- Musicians' Guild of Change Ringers
- National Police Guild (1 CC Rep)
- Newcastle Universities Society
- North American Guild of Change Ringers (4 CC Reps)
- North Staffordshire Association (3 CC Reps)
- North Wales Association (2 CC Reps)
- Norwich Diocesan Association (4 CC Reps)
- Nottingham University Society of Change Ringers
- Open University Society
- Oxford Diocesan Guild of Church Bell Ringers(6 CC Reps)
- Oxford Society of Change Ringers(1 CC Reps)
- Oxford University Society of Change Ringers (1 CC Rep)
- Peterborough Diocesan Guild (4 CC Reps)
- Portsmouth University
- Post and Telecom Ringers Guild
- Rambling Ringers Society
- Reading University
- Royal Air Force Guild
- Royal Naval Guild of Bellringers
- Saffron Walden Society
- Salisbury Diocesan Guild (5 CC Reps)
- Scottish Association (2 CC Reps)
- Sheffield Universities' Guild
- Shropshire Association (2 CC Reps)
- Society of Cambridge Youths
- Society of Royal Cumberland Youths (3 CC Reps)
- Society Of National Youths
- Society of Sherwood Youths (1 CC Reps)
- South African Guild (1 CC Reps)
- South Northamptonshire Society
- Southampton City Ringers
- Southampton University Guild of Change Ringers
- Southwell and Nottingham Diocesan Guild (4 CC Reps)
- St Agatha's Guild (1 CC Reps)
- St Andrews University
- St Brannock's Society of North Devon
- St David's Diocesan Guild (1 CC Reps)
- St James's Society
- St Martin's Guild for the Diocese of Birmingham (2 CC Reps)
- St Mary Abbotts Guild, Kensington
- Suffolk Guild of Ringers (4 CC Reps)
- Surrey Association (4 CC Reps)
- Surrey University Society
- Sussex County Association (5 CC Reps)
- Swansea and Brecon Diocesan Guild (2 CC Reps)
- Teachers, National Guild of
- Three and Four Bell National Society
- Towcester, St Lawrence Society
- Truro Diocesan Guild (5 CC Reps)
- University of Bristol Society of Change Ringers (2 CC Reps)
- University of London Society of Change Ringers (1 CC Reps)
- Veronese, Associazione Suonatori di Campane a Sistema (2 CC Reps)
- Wells Amateur Bellringing Society
- Welsh Colleges Guild
- West Anglia Society
- Whiting Society
- Winchester and Portsmouth Diocesan Guild (5 CC Reps)
- Worcestershire and Districts Association (4 CC Reps)
- York Colleges Guild
- Yorkshire Association (5 CC Reps)

== List of carillon organizations ==
- The Guild of Carillonneurs in North America
- Royal Carillon School "Jef Denyn"
- World Carillon Federation

== List of handbell organizations ==
- Bells at Temple Square
- Dorothy Shaw Bell Choir
- Pikes Peak Ringers
- The Raleigh Ringers
