= Peal board =

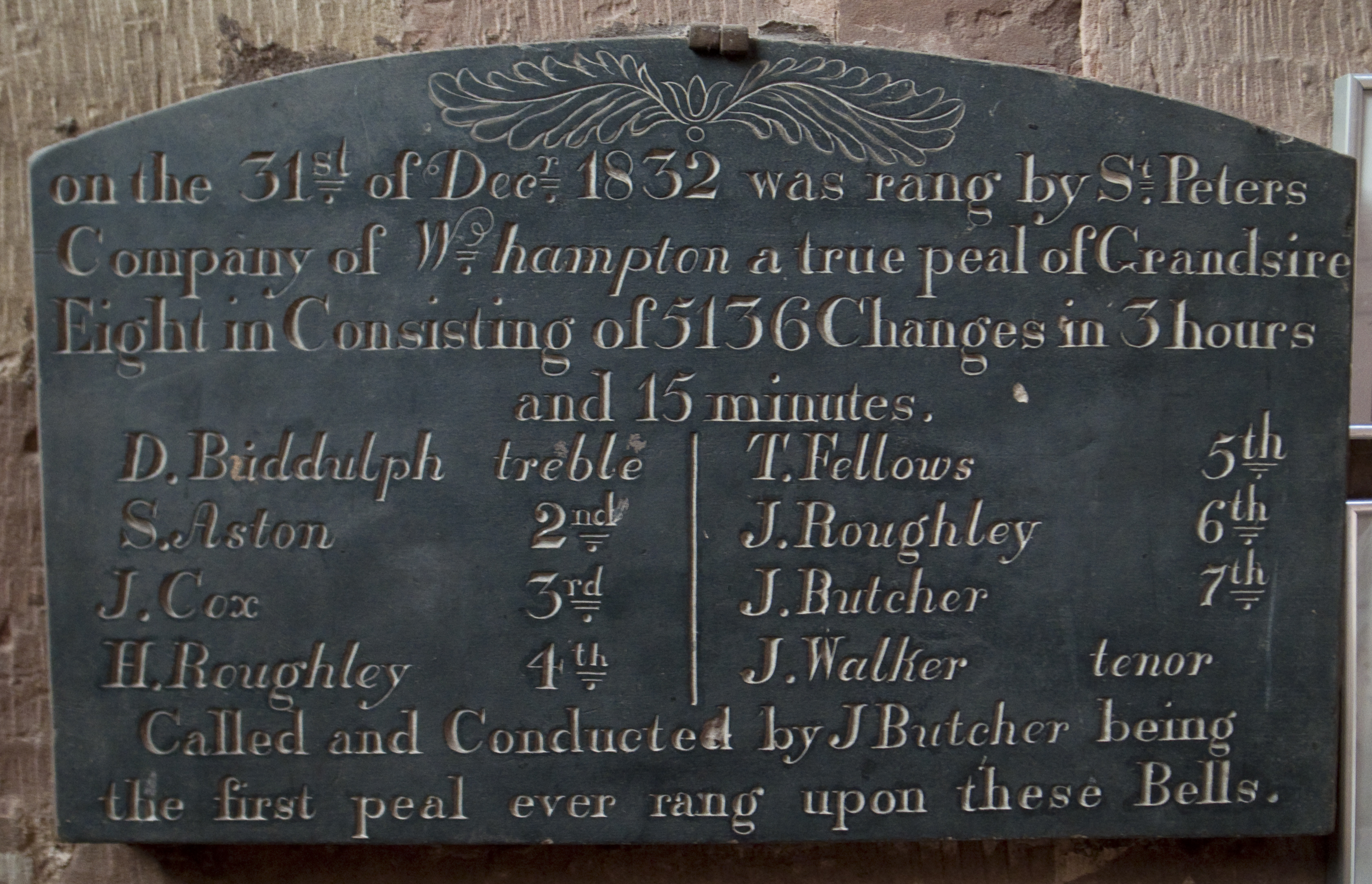

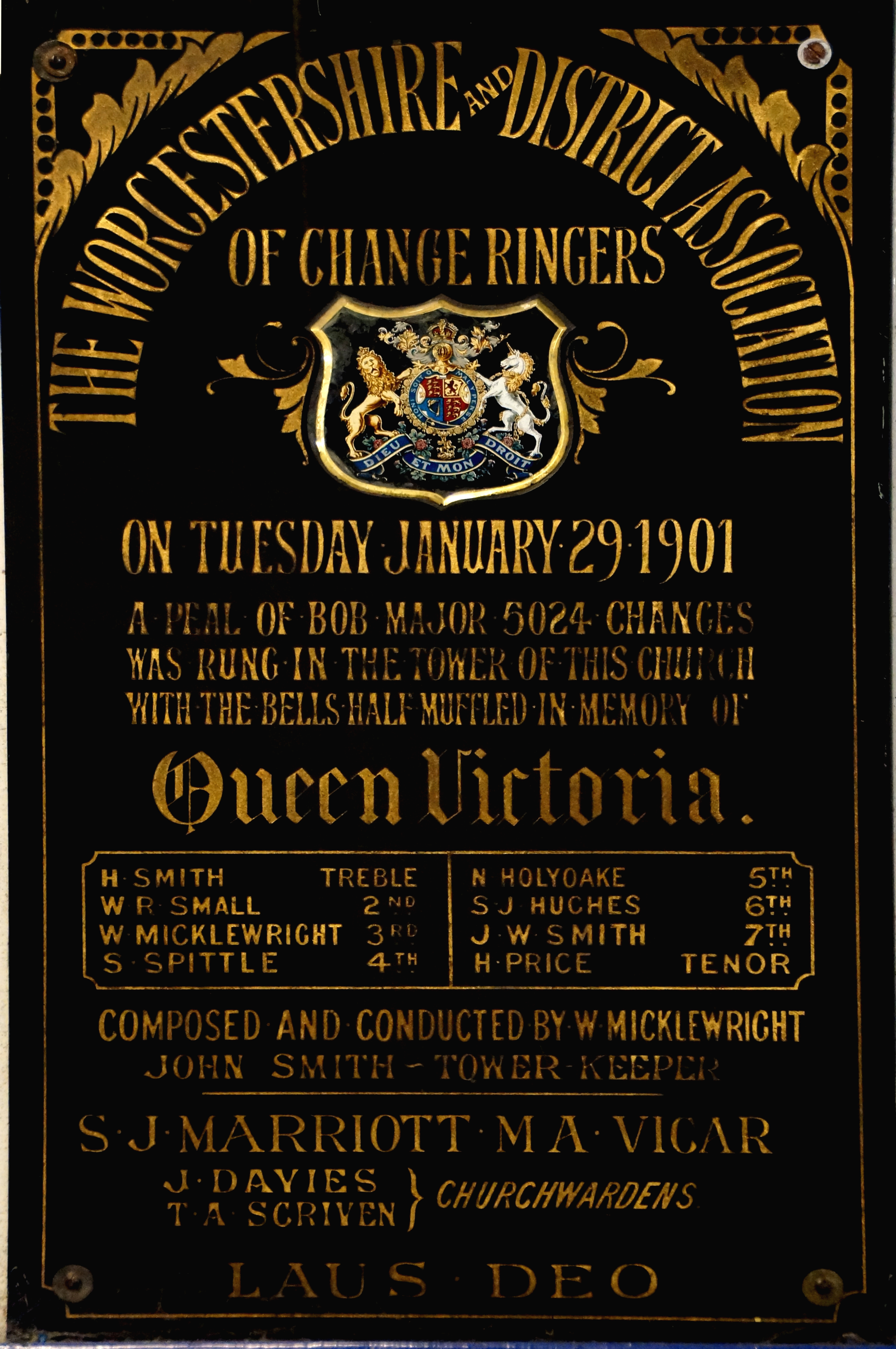
Peal board in Netherton, West Midlands for the funeral of Queen Victoria, 1901

A peal board records on a wooden, metal, stone or canvas plaque a peal rung on church bells.

== Peal ==
In modern terms a peal is the ringing of 5000 or more different changes on bells (5040 on 7 or fewer bells) in the "English style" of change ringing. The Central Council of Church Bell Ringers determines the rules for allowing a peal.

== Peal board ==
Early peal boards often record a historical first achievement such as first peal on the bells (such as the first in the city of Chester) or the first peal of a particular method. More commonly they record an event such as a royal occasion, induction of an incumbent or funeral of a ringer.

Many important peal boards were destroyed by incendiary bombs during World War II including that recording the first peal by the College Youths in 1725 at St Brides.
