= Blagovest =

Type of peal in Russian Orthodox bell ringing

The blagovest is a type of peal in Russian Orthodox bell ringing. Its name means Annunciation or Good News, and is the call to prayer rung before the beginning of divine services, as well as during the services. The bells are also rung at the carrying out of the deceased. The rules of ringing and the bell used are specified by the rules of the Orthodox divine liturgy.

The blagovest consists of the ringing of a single bell.

A blagovest is rung with a large bell, therefore the category of large bells are called blagovestniks.
