= Bell-ringer =

Occupation

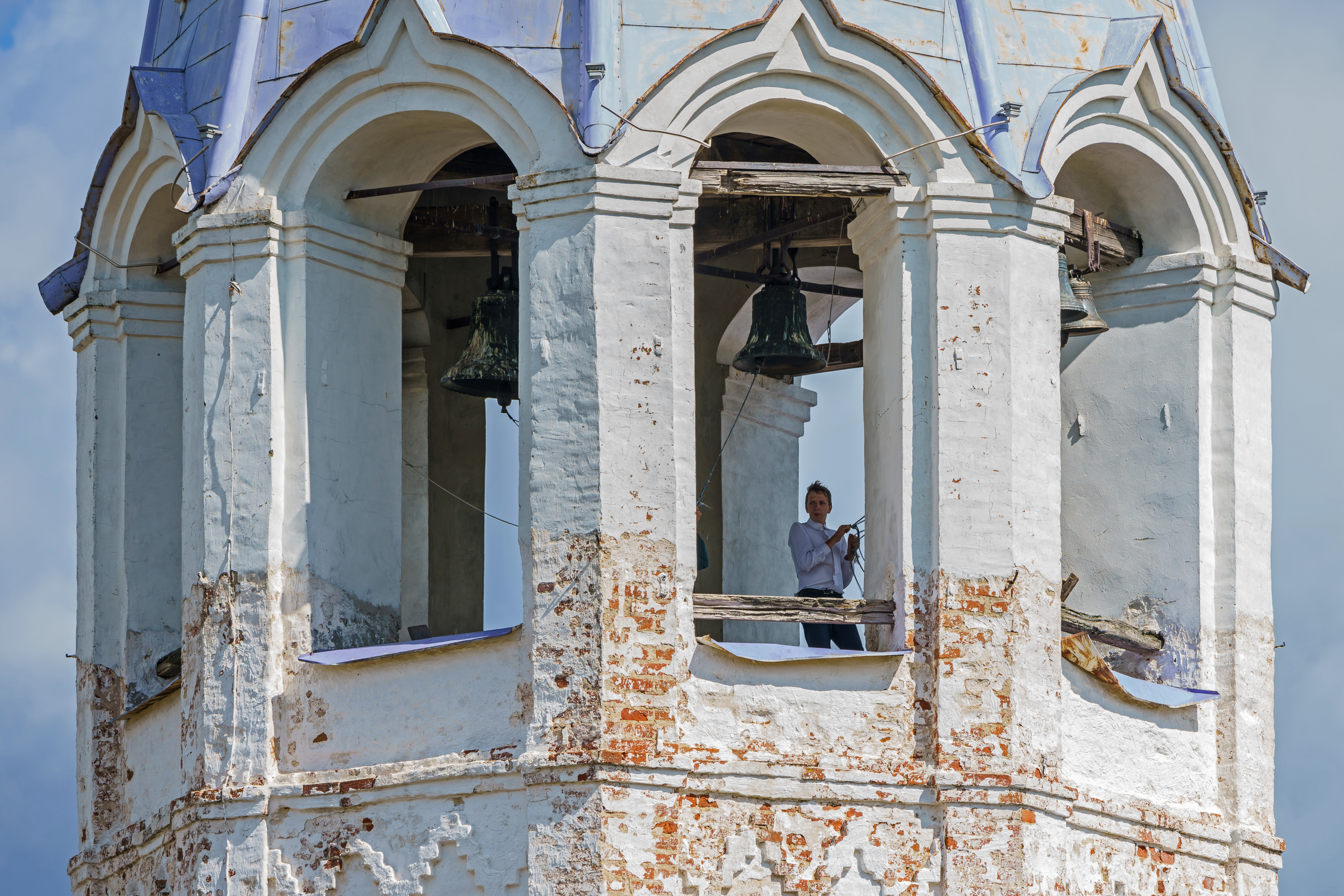
A bell-ringer at work in Palekh, Russia

A bell-ringer is a person who rings a bell, usually a church bell, by means of a rope or other mechanism.

Despite some automation of bells for random swinging, there are still many active bell-ringers in the world, particularly those with an advanced ringing tradition such as full-circle or Russian ringing, which are artistic and skilled performances difficult to automate.

The term campanologist is popularly misused to refer to a bell-ringer, but this properly refers to someone engaged in the study of bells—which is known as campanology.

Although in some places carillons are used to sound bells, they are "played" by carillonneurs, not by bell-ringers, and are associated with the ringing of tunes in the Western musical tradition.

== Full-circle ringing ==
=== English full-circle ringing ===
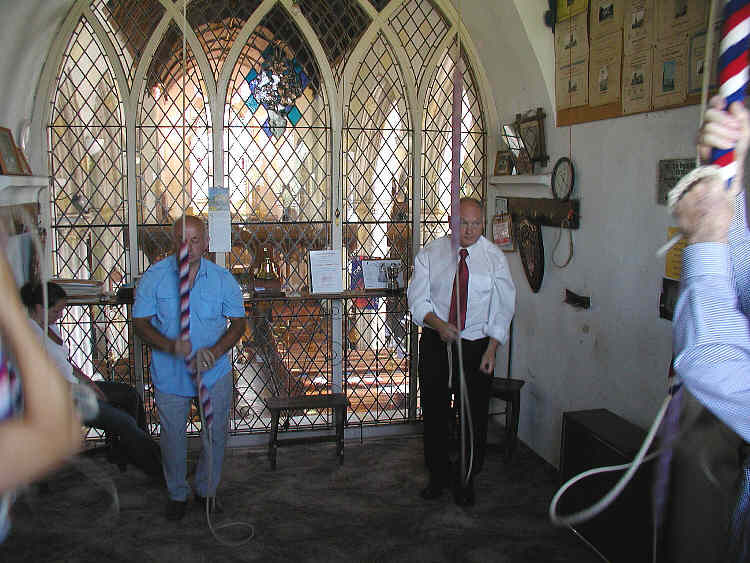
English full-circle bell ringers at Stoke Gabriel parish church, Devon, England

In England, it is estimated there are about 40,000 bell-ringers ringing on rings of bells in the English full-circle style. This type of ringing cannot be automated because of the large rotating masses of the bells and the exact regulation in speed of striking that is required.

The high level of control exerted by ringers means the bells can be struck with both accurate and equal spacing, and can change their striking pattern at each stroke. In addition the Doppler effect due to the movement of the bell when it is struck, and the sharp attack of the strike and the fast die-away due to damping by the clapper, imparts a unique musical sound.

This style of ringing takes place every week in several thousand belfries in England, and to a lesser extent other English-speaking nations. It is supported by the Central Council of Church Bell Ringers, founded in 1891, which is dedicated to representing change ringers around the world.

=== Bolognese full-circle ringing ===
This system originated during the Middle Ages, and was perfected in the 19th century. It is a form of full circle ringing which requires the bell ringers to manually swing the bells whilst standing beside them in the bell chamber. It was originally designed for an ensemble of four or five bells, nowadays it is also sometimes used for a set of six bells.

The bells are never counterbalanced. They are mounted on a wooden structure called the castle, and flanked by a wooden support called the goat. The bells are not very heavy, as the rotation has to be fast. Generally, every bell that weighs less than 800 kg (16 cwt) is rung by one person. The heaviest bell used with this system is in Bologna Cathedral, and is called la Nonna ("the Granny") and weighs 3.3 tonnes. Thirteen people are needed to ring a scappata or a calata with it. The bell ringers have to be in contact with the bells and mechanical devices are not allowed.

=== Veronese full-circle ringing ===
This method of full circle ringing is similar to English full-circle ring, in that it uses ropes to enable the bell ringers to manipulate the bells. It is not clear whether hanging the bells in this way was independently developed at San Giorgio or whether the method was imported from England where bells are also hung for full circle ringing.

== Chiming ==
Chiming is the art of ringing bells which are "hung dead" or stationary.

=== Russia ===
A bell-ringer demonstrating Russian chiming on a portable belfry.

Bell ringing saw a spectacular revival in Russia with the growth of the Russian Orthodox Church (see Russian Orthodox bell ringing).

Technically, bells rung in the Russian tradition are sounded exclusively by chiming (i.e., moving only the clapper so that it strikes the side of a stationary bell) and never by swinging the bell. For the Russian tradition a special complex system of ropes is used, designed individually for each belltower. All the ropes are gathered at approximately one point, where the bell-ringer (zvonar) stands. Some ropes (the smaller ones) are played by hand, the bigger ropes are played by foot. The major part of the ropes (usually - all ropes) are not actually pulled, but rather pressed. Since one end of every rope is fixed, and the ropes are kept in tension, a press or even a punch on a rope makes a clapper strike the side of its bell.

The secrets of this technique have passed from generation to generation, but by the 20th century this art was almost lost. Training took place only at workshops until 2008, then the first permanent traditional bell-ringing school opened in Moscow, under the leadership of Drozdihin Ilya.

=== Ellacombe apparatus ===
The Ellacombe apparatus is an English mechanism devised for performing change ringing on church bells by striking stationary bells with hammers. It does not produce the same sound as full circle ringing on the same bells due to the absence of the Doppler effect as the bells do not rotate, and the lack of a damping effect from the clapper after each strike. As it requires considerable expertise for one person to ring changes on several bells, it is rarely used for change ringing, and usually a set sequence or a tune is played.

== Small-arc swinging ==
The swinging of bells through a small arc of movement does not allow the ringer to control the speed of the bell striking. Thus a number of bells rung together in this way results in an uncoordinated sound as the bells each swing at their own speed dictated by the physics of a simple pendulum. Sometimes the bells are spaced out, and sometimes they strike simultaneously. This randomness also occurs with motorised bells ringing together. This a common method of ringing where full-circle bells do not exist, and requires little skill.

== Safety ==
It has been asserted that the Middle Ages, it was believed that the sound of a bell could disperse thunder and that many bell-ringers were electrocuted as a result. In France between the years 1753 and 1786, 103 bell-ringers were killed during thunderstorms as a result of holding onto wet bell ropes. The Parlement of Paris enforced an edict in 1786 to prohibit the practice. Deaths likely continued until the 19th century when the lightning rod came into general use.

A Spanish study measured the sound pressure levels at 120 dB inside a bell tower. Despite this, little occupational hearing damage was found in bell ringers, likely because of the sound being brief in duration.

== Decline ==
By the late 1940s, the Church of Sweden increasingly began to automate the ringing of its church bells and dismiss its employed bell-ringers.

== See also ==
- Theodore the Bellringer
- List of bell ringing organizations
- Quasimodo – famous fictional bellringer
