= Change ringing software =

Overview of technology used in change ringing

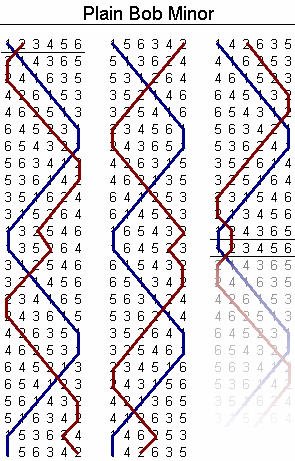
The "Blue Line" of Plain Bob Minor produced by change ringing software.

Change ringing software encompasses the several different types of software in use today in connection with change ringing.

== Modern ==
In the United Kingdom, the Central Council of Church Bell Ringers (CCCBR) maintains a list of change ringing software. There are four general types of software used in connection with change ringing: tools for composition, simulation, record keeping, and maintaining up-to-date bell tower directories.

=== Composing tools ===
The most common use of software in change ringing is composition proving. This type of software is used to take the tedium out of proving change ringing compositions: that is, checking that no change within the composition is repeated. The software will perform the checks required to prove a composition in milliseconds, rather than the hours or days required for paper based proving methods. Often these programs can also analyse compositions to determine the musical rows that they contain.

In recent years, more advanced tools have emerged which can assist the human composer in other ways. These range from pure composition-generation programs such as BYROC and Elf, to more sophisticated programs such as SMC32, which can work alongside the human composer, for instance by linking together existing musical blocks which the composer has created.

The main examples of proving software are:

- Trident
- Beltower

Some examples of composition generation tools:

- BYROC
- Elf

=== Simulator ===
The original use of simulators was to allow the practicing of change ringing in the tower, but nowadays is perhaps used more in the home, using a dumbbell or keyboard. Many different scenarios can now be accommodated by the software. Sensors are used to give temporal information to the computer.

- Single or multiple learner silent practice with computer producing sound of the bell
- Whole band silent practice with computer producing sound of all the bells
- Practice on more bells than you have with the computer adding in the extra bells
- Practice methods that are more advanced that your band is capable with the computer filling in all the bells

The main examples of simulator software are:

- Abel
- Beltower
- Virtual Belfry

=== Recordkeeping ===
Keeping records is very important to some change ringers. Records are often kept in the following areas:

- Grabs (towers visited)
- Peals
- Quarter peals

The main examples of record keeping software are:

- WinRK
- Duco

=== Tower directory ===
An up-to-date directory of towers is often used to plan outings and, used in conjunction with the record keeping software to decide what towers still need to be grabbed.

The main examples of tower directory software are:

- TowerBase

== History ==
The earliest known change ringing programs can be traced back to the 1950s. Some of this history is traced in this article on software firsts.

== See also ==
- Campanology
