= Suffolk Guild of Ringers =

Bellringers society

Suffolk Guild of Ringers for the Diocese of St Edmundsbury and Ipswich
- Guild logo
- Abbreviation: SGR
- Formation: 2 April 1923
- Founded at: St Mary-le-Tower church house, Ipswich
- Legal status: Charity
- Purpose: Promotion of Full circle ringing in Diocese of St Edmundsbury and Ipswich
- Region served: Suffolk
- Members: 776 (2019)
- Chairman: Mark Ogden (2023–)
- Ringing Master: Julian Colman (2025- )
- Affiliations: Central Council of Church Bell Ringers
- Website: www.suffolkbells.org.uk

The Suffolk Guild of Ringers for the Diocese of St Edmundsbury and Ipswich is a society and charity supporting the bell ringers and rings of bells in the Diocese of St Edmundsbury and Ipswich who practice the art of change ringing. The Guild was established on 2 April 1923 at Ipswich and covers over 200 rings of bells in the county of Suffolk in the area that falls within the diocese boundary.

== Origins ==
Prior to the creation of the Diocese of St Edmundsbury and Ipswich the western half of the county was part of the Diocese of Ely and the eastern half was part of the Diocese of Norwich and therefore ringers were members of the respective associations being the Ely Diocesan Association of Church Bell Ringers (EDACR) and the Norwich Diocesan Association of Ringers (NDAR). After the diocese was created in 1914 Ely Diocesan Association adopted the name 'The Ely and St. Edmundsbury Diocesan Association'at the 1919 AGM whilst the Norwich Diocesan Association was known as 'The Norwich and Ipswich Association.' The impetus for the formation of an Suffolk association came mainly from the west of the county but this met with much opposition particularly from (NDAR). The Suffolk County Association, the first solely Suffolk based ringing organisation, was formed on 5 February 1921, at Lavenham, under the mastership of Stedman Symonds, but soon changed its name to the Suffolk Diocesan Association at Easter. On 29 April 1922, there was another change of name to the St. Edmundsbury and Ipswich Diocesan Association. Finally on 2 April 1923 the Suffolk Guild of Ringers was formed after a meeting at St. Mary le Tower Church House, Ipswich with Charles Sedgley being elected master and Rev. Herbert Drake as secretary.

== Operations ==
As of the end of 2019 the Guild has 776 members from 198 towers with ringable bells. Its listed objects are to supporting the recruitment and training of bellringers and cultivating the art of scientific ringing alongside promoting and supporting the restoration and augmentation of rings of bells. The Guild is affiliated to the Central Council of Church Bell Ringers (CCCBR), a global organisation representing all those who practice Change ringing, and currently sends four representatives to be part of the Council.

=== Governance ===
A mixture of elected and appointed officers run the Guild with Guild Management Committee being the main decision making body. The chairman, secretary, treasurer, and ringing master make up the executive and are trustees of Guild which is registered as a charity. The Guild is split into four districts to encourage ringing at a local level through education and training. Each district covers a geographical quarter of the diocese, North East, South East, North West, and South West electing their own ringing master, secretary, treasurer along with representatives to the Guild's committees.

=== Ringing ===
Aside from regular religious services, ringing is often conducted for special occasions such as anniversaries, memorials and other locally or nationally significant events. There are weekly evening practices held at around 80 towers across the Guild where all skills of change ringing are taught and practiced including method ringing. Each district in Guild has a rolling programme of monthly events at a different towers allowing ringers to socialise and practice more advance ringing, events will include outings outside of the Guild, striking contests, and socials. The members of the Guild regularly ring peals, as defined by the Central Council of Church Bell Ringers. Between its formation and the end of 2019 there has been 9812 peals rung for the Guild. Quarter peals, which are performances of continuous method ringing last approximately 45 mins, are also regularly rung by members with around 530 being recorded in 2019.

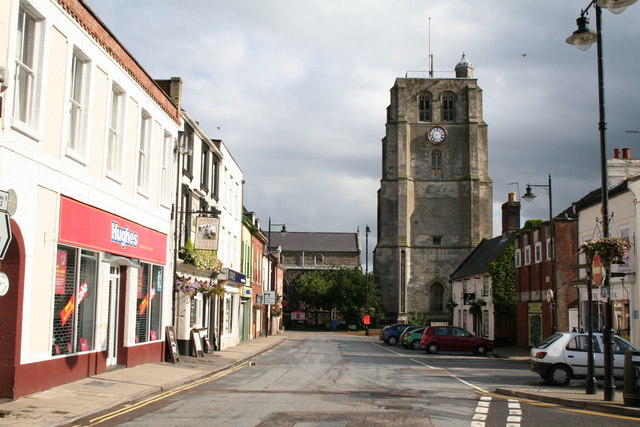
The Bell Tower at Beccles which is operated by the Guild on behalf of the Town Council

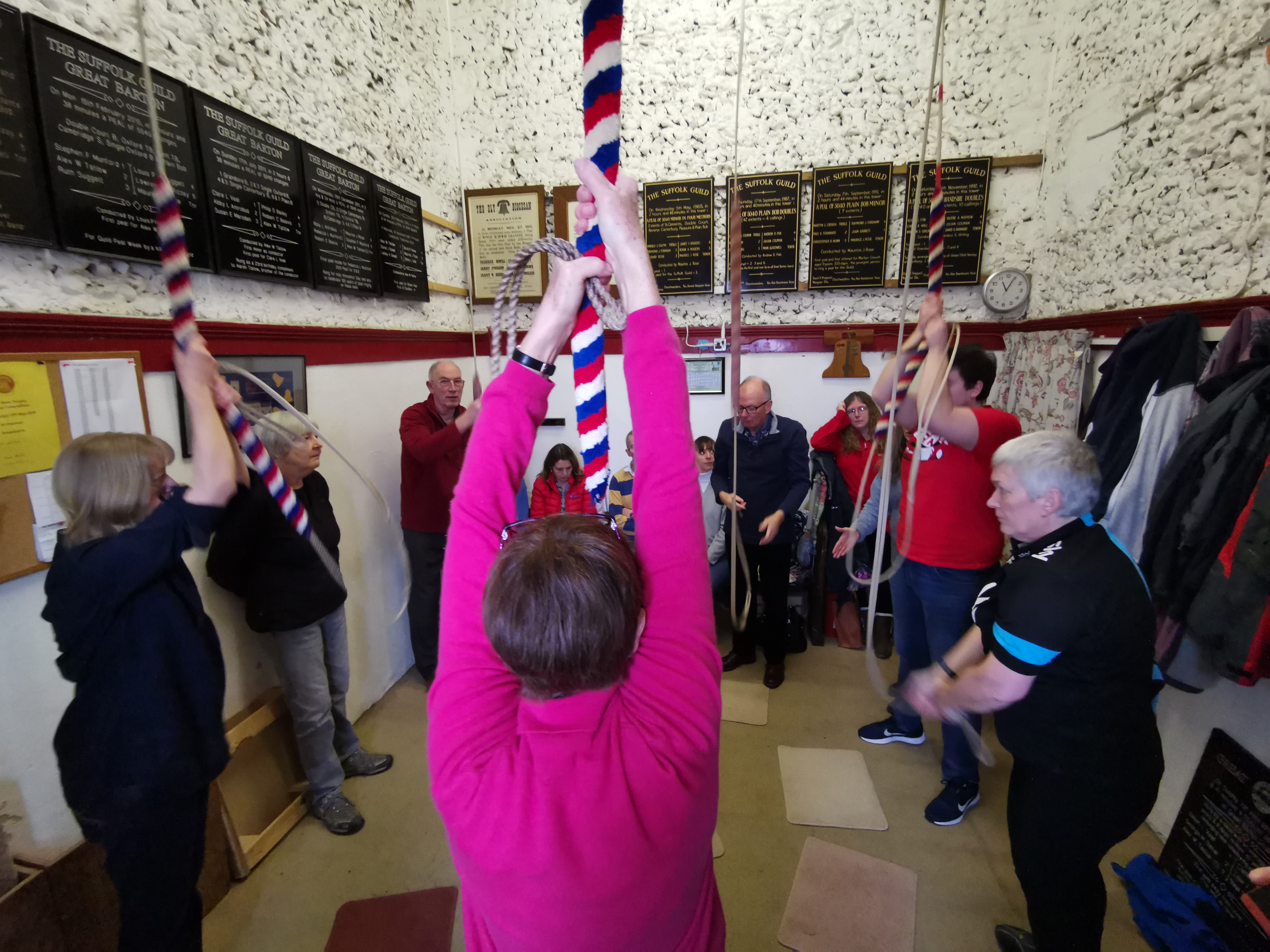
Guild members ringing at Holy Innocents, Great Barton

=== Notable members ===
Imogen Holst was an honorary member and selected a recording of Debenham bells as one of her Desert Island Discs.

== Striking contests ==
There are three annual striking competitions held by the Guild as well as a number held at district level. The three Guild contests are:

- Rose trophy for eight bell method ringing
- Mitson shield for six bell method ringing
- Lester Brett trophy for six bell call change ringing

A combined band is sent represent the Guild as a whole at the East Anglian Ridgman trophy for ten bell method ringing.

=== Rose Trophy ===
Rose Trophy Results
Year	Venue	Winner
1984	Halesworth	SE District
1985	Elveden	St Mary‑le‑Tower
1986	Offton	SE District
1987	Kersey	St Mary-le-Tower
1988	Eye	St Mary-le-Tower
1989	Stowmarket	St Mary-le-Tower
1990	Ipswich, St Margaret	SE District
1991	Stoke by Nayland	St Mary-le-Tower
1992	Worlingworth	St Mary-le-Tower
1993	Horringer	St Mary-le-Tower
1994	Debenham	Grundisburgh
1995	Kersey	St Mary-le-Tower
1996	Aldeburgh	St Mary-le-Tower
1997	Stowmarket	St Mary-le-Tower
1998	Hollesley	St Mary-le-Tower
1999	Boxford	St Mary-le-Tower
2000	Horham	St Mary-le-Tower
2001	Cotton	St Mary-le-Tower
2002	Ufford	St Mary‑le‑Tower
2003	Stoke by Nayland	St Mary‑le‑Tower
2004	Southwold	St Mary‑le‑Tower
2005	Stowmarket	NW District
2006	Orford	NE District
2007	Hadleigh	SE District
2008	Rendham	St Mary-le-Tower
2009	Dalham	St Mary-le-Tower
2010	Woodbridge	NE District
2011	Stoke by Nayland	SE District
2012	Leiston	NE District
2013	Gislingham	NE District
2014	Helmingham	NW District
2015	Lavenham	St Mary-le-Tower
2016	Southwold	St Mary-le-Tower
2017	Horringer	NE District
2018	Debenham	SE District
2019	Lavenham	NW District
2020	Not contested	N/A
2021	Horringer	The Norman Tower
2022	Offton	St Mary-le-Tower
2023	Hitcham	SE District
2024	Felixstowe	The Norman Tower
2025	Aldeburgh	

=== Mitson Shield ===
Mitson Shield results
Year	Venue	Winner
1963	Bredfield	SE District
1964	Buxhall	SE District
1965	Cavendish	Henley
1966	Theberton	Beccles
1967	Horringer	Framsden
1968	Ashbocking	Bramford
1969	Woolpit	Bramford
1970	Higham	Lavenham
1971	Benhall	Lavenham
1972	Walsham	Clare
1973	Offton	Horringer
1974	Bacton	Horringer
1975	Nayland	Grundisburgh
1976	Saxmundham	Lavenham
1977	Great Barton	Grundisburgh
1978	Bredfield	Beccles
1979	Kersey	Lavenham
1980	Wingfield	St Mary‑le‑Tower
1981	Buxhall	St Mary‑le‑Tower
1982	Henley	St Mary‑le‑Tower
1983	Cavendish	St Mary‑le‑Tower
1984	Blythburgh	St Mary‑le‑Tower
1985	Fornham St Martin	St Mary‑le‑Tower
1986	Bramford	St Mary‑le‑Tower
1987	Hintlesham	St Mary‑le‑Tower
1988	Yaxley	St Mary‑le‑Tower
1989	Buxhall	St Mary‑le‑Tower
1990	Sproughton	St Mary‑le‑Tower
1991	Nayland	St Mary‑le‑Tower
1992	Tannington	Stowmarket
1993	Rougham	Stowmarket
1994	Otley	Grundisburgh
1995	Polstead	Grundisburgh
1996	Saxmundham	Grundisburgh
1997	Buxhall	Stowmarket
1998	Tunstall	St Mary‑le‑Tower
1999	Bildeston	St Mary‑le‑Tower
2000	Oakley	St Mary‑le‑Tower
2001	Bacton	St Mary‑le‑Tower
2002	Pettistree	St Mary‑le‑Tower
2003	Polstead	St Mary‑le‑Tower
2004	Reydon	St Mary‑le‑Tower
2005	Gt Finborough	Grundisburgh
2006	Tunstall	Rendham
2007	Monks Eleigh	Grundisburgh
2008	Sweffling	Pettistree
2009	Exning	St Mary‑le‑Tower
2010	Hasketon	St Mary‑le‑Tower
2011	Nayland	St Mary-le-Tower
2012	Blythburgh	Pettistree
2013	Thornham Magna	The Wolery
2014	Ashbocking	St Mary‑le‑Tower
2015	Rattlesden	St Mary‑le‑Tower
2016	Reydon	St Mary‑le‑Tower
2017	Walsham‑le‑Willows	Pakenham
2018	Earl Stonham	St Mary‑le‑Tower
2019	Polstead	Pettistree
2020	Not contested	
2021	Not contested	
2022	Blythburgh	St Mary‑le‑Tower
2023	Troston	St Mary-le-Tower A
2024	Falkenham	Pettistree
2025	Yoxford	

== Events ==
=== Ipswich Christmas Ringing ===
Since 1993 Guild members have rung all the bells at the churches in Ipswich town centre on the Saturday before Christmas.

=== St Edmund's day ===
The Guild supported the campaign to restore Edmund the Martyr as patron saint of England by coordinating annual ringing of bells across Suffolk on his feast day of the 20 November due to his connection with Suffolk.

=== Ringing for Peace Armistice 100 ===
On the 100th anniversary of the armistice November 2018 members of the Guild rang the bells at all the ringable towers in the diocese in a single day to mark the commemorations, a feat which had never been attempted before.

== Affiliated towers ==
The towers covered by the Guild which contain four or more bells hung for change ringing.

=== North East District ===
1. Aldeburgh, St Peter and St Paul
2. Badingham
3. Barsham
4. Beccles
5. Bedfield
6. Benhall
7. Blaxhall
8. Blythburgh, Holy Trinity
9. Bramfield, St Andrew
10. Brampton
11. Bungay, St Mary
12. Chediston
13. Covehithe
14. Dennington
15. Fressingfield
16. Great Glemham
17. Halesworth
18. Heveningham, St Margaret
19. Huntingfield, St Mary
20. Kelsale
21. Leiston
22. Mendham
23. Metfield
24. Monk Soham
25. Parham
26. Peasenhall
27. Rendham
28. Reydon
29. Ringsfield
30. Rumburgh
31. Saxmundham
32. Southwold
33. St Cross South Elmham
34. St Margaret South Elmham
35. Stradbroke
36. Sweffling
37. Tannington
38. Theberton
39. Wenhaston
40. Westhall, St Andrew
41. Weybread
42. Wingfield
43. Wissett
44. Woodbridge
45. Worlingham
46. Worlingworth
47. Wrentham
48. Yoxford

=== North West District ===
1. Ampton
2. Bacton
3. Badwell Ash
4. Bardwell
5. Barrow
6. Brandon
7. Brome
8. Burgate
9. Bury St Edmunds, The Norman Tower
10. Buxhall
11. Chevington
12. Cotton
13. Dalham
14. Elveden
15. Eriswell
16. Euston
17. Exning
18. Eye
19. Fornham All Saints
20. Fornham St Martin
21. Freckenham
22. Gislingham
23. Great Ashfield
24. Great Barton
25. Great Finborough, St Andrew
26. Great Livermere
27. Haughley
28. Hepworth
29. Hinderclay
30. Hopton
31. Horringer
32. Hunston
33. Ingham
34. Ixworth
35. Lakenheath
36. Mildenhall
37. Newmarket, Mindinho-le-Tower
38. Newmarket, St Mary
39. Norton, The Owl Ring
40. Oakley
41. Old Newton
42. Pakenham
43. Palgrave
44. Redgrave
45. Rickinghall Superior
46. Rougham
47. Stoke Ash
48. Stowlangtoft
49. Stowmarket, St Peter & St Mary
50. Thelnetham
51. Thorndon
52. Thornham Magna
53. Thrandeston
54. Thurston
55. Tostock
56. Troston
57. Walsham le Willows
58. Wattisfield
59. West Stow
60. Wetherden
61. Wetheringsett
62. Whepstead
63. Wickham Skeith
64. Yaxley

=== South East District ===
1. Ashbocking, All Saints
2. Barham, St Mary & St Peter
3. Barking
4. Baylham
5. Bramford
6. Brandeston
7. Bredfield
8. Burgh
9. Campsea Ashe
10. Clopton
11. Coddenham
12. Copdock
13. Cretingham
14. Debenham
15. Earl Soham
16. Earl Stonham
17. Easton
18. Falkenham
19. Felixstowe
20. Framlingham
21. Framsden
22. Grundisburgh
23. Hacheston
24. Harkstead
25. Hasketon
26. Helmingham
27. Henley, St Peter
28. Hintlesham
29. Holbrook
30. Hollesley
31. Horham
32. Iken
33. Ipswich, Old Stoke, The Wolery
34. Ipswich, St Clement
35. Ipswich, St Lawrence
36. Ipswich, St Margaret
37. Ipswich, St Mary at Quay
38. Ipswich, St Mary le Tower
39. Ipswich, St Matthew
40. Ipswich, St Nicholas
41. Kettleburgh
42. Marlesford
43. Monewden
44. Offton
45. Orford
46. Otley
47. Pettistree
48. Rushmere St Andrew
49. Sproughton
50. Stonham Aspal
51. Stutton
52. Tattingstone
53. Tuddenham St Martin
54. Tunstall
55. Ufford
56. Wickham Market
57. Wilby
58. Winston

=== South West District ===
1. Acton, All Saints
2. Assington
3. Bildeston
4. Boxford
5. Bures
6. Cavendish, St Mary
7. Clare
8. Cowlinge
9. Drinkstone
10. Edwardstone
11. Elmsett
12. Felsham
13. Glemsford
14. Great Thurlow
15. Hadleigh
16. Hartest
17. Haverhill
18. Hawkedon
19. Higham
20. Hitcham
21. Kedington
22. Kersey, St Mary
23. Lavenham
24. Little Glemham
25. Little Thurlow
26. Long Melford
27. Monks Eleigh
28. Nayland
29. Polstead
30. Poslingford
31. Preston St Mary
32. Rattlesden
33. Stansfield
34. Stoke by Clare
35. Stoke by Nayland, St Mary
36. Stradishall
37. Stratford St Mary
38. Sudbury All Saints
39. Sudbury St Gregory
40. Sudbury, St Peter
41. Woolpit
