= Russian Orthodox bell ringing =

Tradition in the Russian Orthodox church

A bell-ringer in a bell tower. Ropes lead from the clappers of the bells to the station where the ringer stands.

Russian Orthodox bell ringing has a history starting from the baptism of Rus in 988 and plays an important role in the traditions of the Russian Orthodox Church.

== Theology ==
The ringing of bells is one of the most essential elements of an Orthodox church. Church bells are rung to:

- Summon the faithful to services
- Express the triumphal joy of the Christian Church
- Announce important moments during the services both to those in church and to those who are not able to be physically present in the church, so that all may be united in prayer
- Strengthen Christians in piety and faith by its sound, which Orthodox Christians believe is "alloyed with divine grace to disperse and destroy the forces of cruelty and of demonic suggestion"
- Proclaim important events, such as the death of a member of the church; the arrival of an important person, such as the bishop or civil ruler; an emergency such as fire or flood; or victory in battle (as dramatically recreated in the triumphant conclusion of the 1812 Overture).

The use of bells is not only practical, but is also considered to be spiritual. Bells are sometimes referred to as "singing icons", because they establish the acoustic space of an Orthodox temple just as painted icons and hymnography define its visual and noetic space, respectively. Icons are considered "scripture in image" as bells are "scripture in sound".

There are several liturgical services which point out the importance of bells in the Russian Orthodox Church: Blessing the Foundation of a New Bell Tower, Blessing a New Bell Tower (after construction is completed), Blessing, Naming, and Chrismating a Bell. There is also a service for the blessing of a bell ringer.

Bells are blessed with a ritual containing many of the elements of the Rite of Baptism. The new bell is blessed with holy water and censed, both outside and inside, and the priest lays hands on the bell to bless it. During the rite, the bell is "named" (that is, consecrated in honour of a saint, whose icon has often been molded into the side of the bell when it was cast at the foundry—but though a bell may be called the "Gabriel" bell, it would never be called the "St. Gabriel" bell, because a bell is not a saint).

The theological understanding of bells as "weapons" in spiritual warfare, and their role in the Christian life is emphasized during the rite by the scripture lesson from Numbers 10:1–10:

"And the Lord spoke to Moses, saying: Make for yourself two silver trumpets … And they shall be for you for the calling of the assembly … When you sound an alarm … And if you shall go forth to war … And in the days of your rejoicing …"

The use of bells is symbolic of the proclamation of the Gospel. Sometimes Orthodox churches and monasteries will combine the use of bells with the striking of a wooden or metal semantron, with the semantron being sounded first, then the bells being rung later. The quieter and simpler sound of the semantron is understood to symbolize the Old Testament prophets, for it is the symbol only of a coming event, whereas the ringing of the bells is spread far into the air symbolizing the annunciation of the Gospel throughout the world.

== History ==
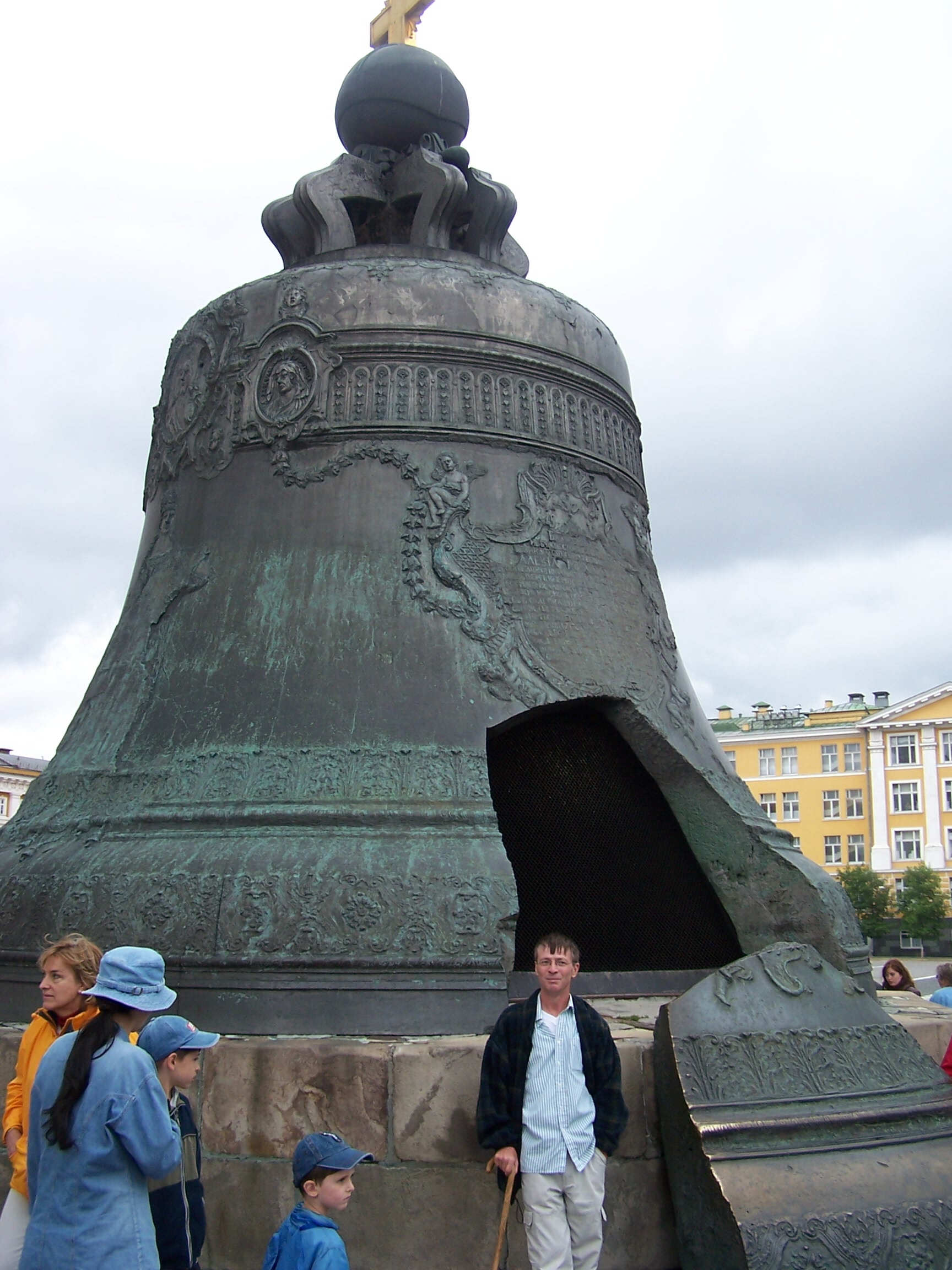
The Tsar Bell standing beside the Ivan the Great Bell Tower in Moscow; the sculpting of the wall of the bell can be seen in the broken section.

After the conversion of Kievan Rus to Christianity in the 10th century, bells came gradually into use everywhere. Originally, a flat piece of wood or metal called a semantron would be beaten rhythmically with a mallet to summon the faithful to services. This was especially true in monasteries, some of which still to this day use both semantrons and bells.

While the semantron was inherited from Greece, the use of church bells was imported into Russia from Western Europe. The Russian word for bell is kolokol, which comes from the German word glocke, derived from the Latin clocca, which in turn appears to come from the Irish clog. The word for bell in Church Slavonic is kampan, which is derived from Latin campana. During the fifteenth century the semantron began to be gradually replaced by bells. At that time, several foundries for bell making were established in Russia. Russian church bells are commonly cast using a mixture of bronze and tin, often with silver added to the bell metal, to produce their unique sonority and resonance. Russian bells also tend to differ from Western bells in the proportion of their height to width, and the method of varying the thickness of the walls of the bell. The clapper ("tongue") of the bell also follows a different design than that used in the West.

The art of bellfounding reached its pinnacle in the 18th century, with the production of unimaginably huge bells. The largest bell in the world, the Tsar Bell (218 tons) was cast in 1733 for the Ivan the Great Bell Tower in Moscow. Unfortunately, the Tsar Bell was damaged in a fire in 1737 before it could be successfully hung, and stands today at the base of the tower. The largest working bell in the world is the Dormition Bell (144,000 lb) which hangs in the same Ivan the Great Bell Tower.

After the Bolshevik Revolution, the Soviet Union severely persecuted Christianity. Numerous bells were destroyed and during certain periods the production of church bells all but stopped. After the fall of the Iron Curtain the production of bells resumed, and has experienced a surge of activity as many of the churches that were destroyed are being rebuilt.

== Technique of ringing ==
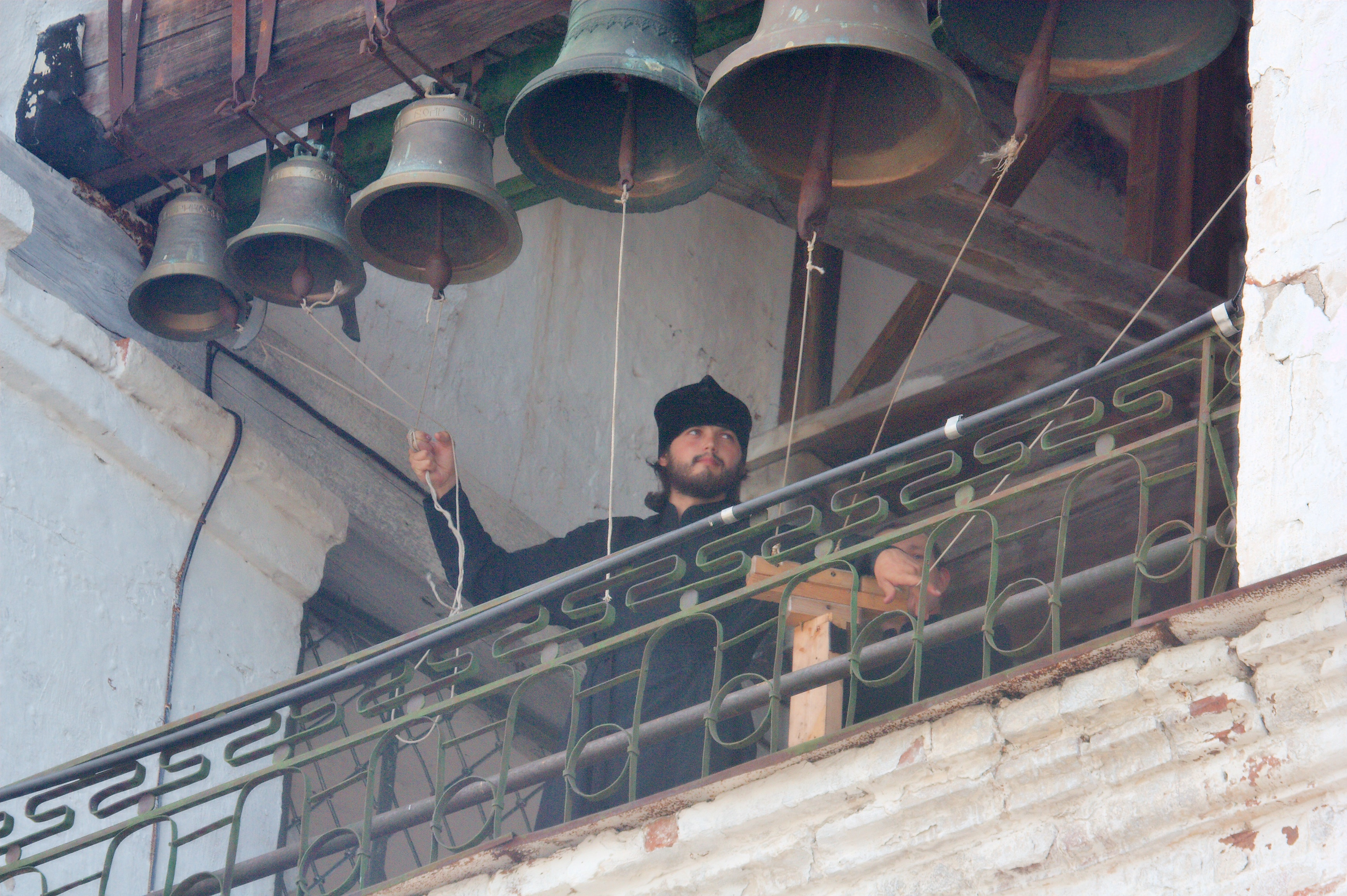
Ringing the bells at Ipatiev Monastery in Kostroma, Russia.

Bell-ringer demonstrating Russian ringing on a portable belfry

Technically, bells rung in the Russian tradition are sounded exclusively by chiming (i.e., moving only the clapper so that it strikes the side of a stationary bell) and never by swinging the bell. For the Russian tradition a special complex system of ropes is used, designed individually for each belltower. All the ropes are gathered at approximately one point, where the bell-ringer (zvonar) stands. Some ropes (the smaller ones) are played by hand. The bigger ropes are played by foot. The major part of the ropes (usually – all ropes) are not actually pulled, but rather pressed. Since one end of every rope is fixed, and the ropes are kept in tension, a press or even a punch on a rope makes a clapper strike the side of its bell.

The secrets of this technique have passed from generation to generation, but by the 20th century this art was almost lost. Training took place only at workshops until 2008, then the first permanent traditional bell-ringing school opened in Moscow, under the leadership of Drozdihin Ilya.

No melody is employed, as in the Western carillon, but rather a complicated polyrhythmical sequence of sounds is produced. "The foundation of Orthodox bell ringing lies not in melody but in rhythm, with its intrinsic dynamic, and in the interaction of the timbres of [various] bells." These sequences have a very special harmony, since Russian bells (unlike Western European ones) are not tuned to a single note. Western bells usually have an octave between the loudest upper tone ("ring") and the loudest lower tone ("hum"). Russian bells have a seventh between these sounds. Generally, a good Russian bell is tuned to produce a whole scale of sounds (up to several dozen of them). This effect is accomplished both by the composition of the alloy from which the bell is cast and the sculpting of the sides of the bell in the mold.

== Types of ringing ==
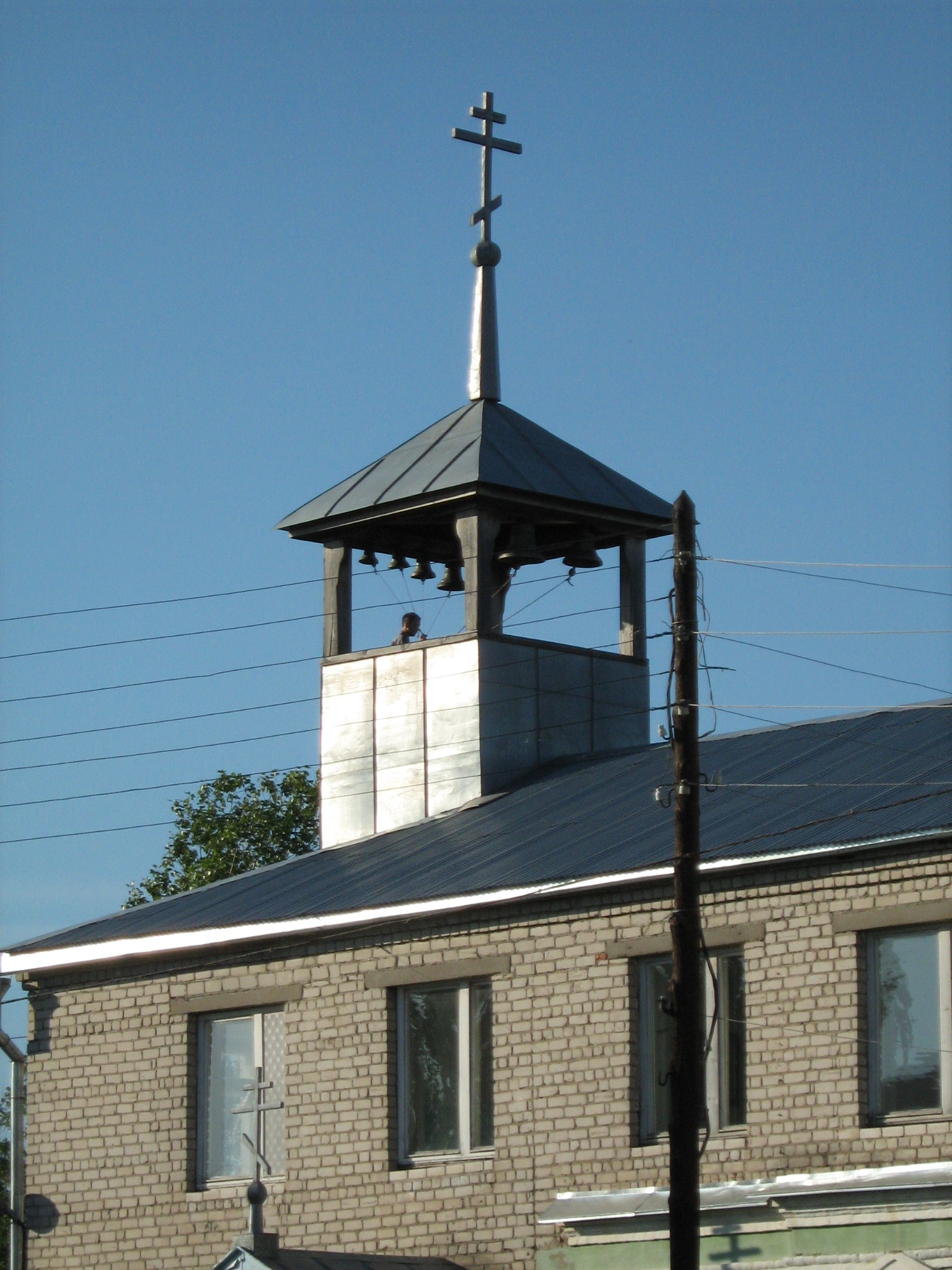
A bell-ringer works the ropes on top of a small church in Old Kstovo.

The Russian Orthodox typicon provides for different types of bell ringing. Different ringing is used on different days (on working days, on Sunday, on holy days, during fasts, Lent, Easter etc.) Different ringing is required for different services (for morning service, service for the dead, Liturgy, etc.). These differences are accomplished by ringing particular bells in particular ways.

=== Terminology ===
To understand the Russian Orthodox method of bell ringing, it is necessary to recognize a few items of terminology. The bells in an Orthodox bell tower (zvonnitsa) are organized into three groups:

- Zazvonny— the smallest, or soprano bells.
- Podzvonny— the middle, or alto bells.
- Blagovestnik— the largest, or bass bells.

Within each of these three groups there may be several bells of varying size, all within the general range of the group. The larger the bell, the deeper its voice.

A zvon is a toll on any bell or bells.

A zvonar is a bell ringer. In the Orthodox church, this is a tonsured (clerical) position, and there is a distinct service of the "Setting Apart of a Bell Ringer". The use of electric bells is forbidden in the Orthodox Church, because it is a sacred function, and may only be performed by a member of the church. Before he goes into the belltower, the zvonar will go to the priest (or the igumen if it is a monastery) for a blessing to ring the bells.

Different ringing is used at different moments of the service (before the service, during the most essential parts of the All-Night Vigil or Divine Liturgy, while the departed is being carried to the cemetery, etc.). Four kinds of canonical tolls are distinguished, which, rung separately or in combination, comprise all the diversity of Orthodox bell-ringing: Blagovest, Perebor, Perezvon, and Trezvon.

=== Blagovest ===
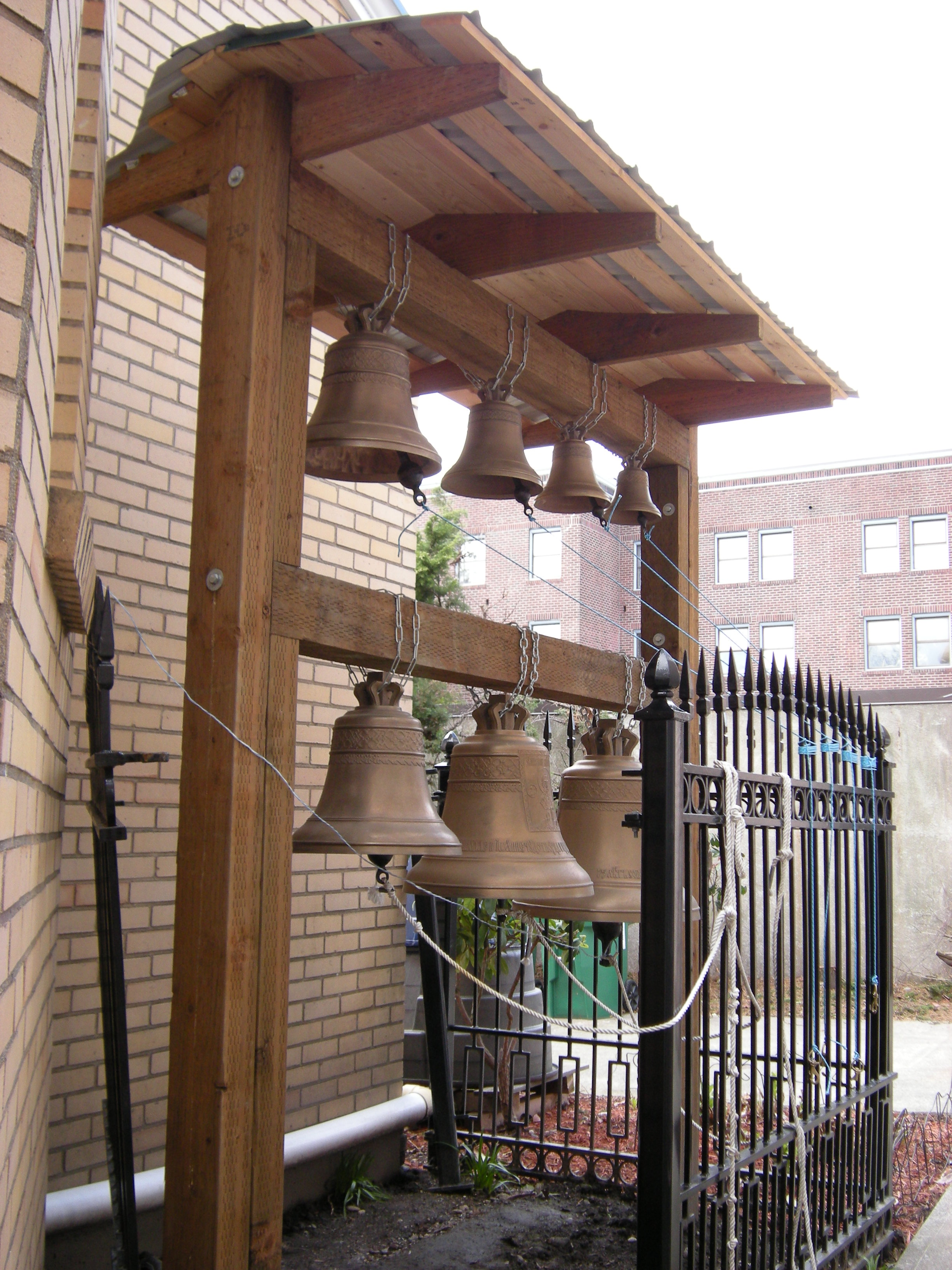
Bells at St. Nicholas Russian Orthodox Memorial Cathedral, Seattle, Washington.

The blagovest is the measured striking of a single large bell (called the blagovestnik). Blagovest means "annunciation", or "good news" because with this ringing the believers are notified that the divine service is about to begin in the church.

As a separate toll before the beginning of a divine service, the blagovest commences with three slow strokes (i.e., with rather long pauses between), and thereafter continues with more frequent, measured strokes, sometimes ending with three more slow strokes. According to the Typikon, the blagovest should last for as long as it takes to read through Psalm 118 (Septuagint; KJV: Psalm 119) once, or Psalm 50 (KJV: Psalm 51) twelve times.

Depending on the type of the divine service, the blagovest is classified as "regular" (obyknovenny, i.e., fast and often accomplished by swinging the clapper to both sides of the bell), or "Lenten" (postny, i.e., slow, and on only one side of the bell). On Great Feasts the blagovest is tolled on the largest blagovestnik in the tower and the toll as a rule is faster, louder, and longer.

Besides the normal blagovest, in Orthodox ringing there is another, named “tidal” (valovoy) or "great" (bolshoi), when strokes on the largest blagovestnik are mixed with tolls on another blagovestnik.

The Blagovest can be sounded on different bells, depending on the day. Large bell towers typically have five Blagovestniki (ranged from larger to smaller):

- Festal or Triumphal (Prazdnichny or Torzhestvenny)
- Polyeleos (Polyeleyny)
- Sunday (Voskresny)
- Daily or Ferial (Budnichny or Prostodnevny)
- Small or Lenten (Maly or Postny).

=== Perebor ===
The Perebor Russian: Перебор is the funeral zvon. Each individual bell is struck once, from the smallest to the largest, in a slow, steady peal. After that, all of the bells are struck together at the same time. Striking the bells from the smallest to the largest symbolizes the stages of a person's life from birth to death; the final striking of all the bells together symbolizes the end of earthly life. During the perebor, each stroke of a bell should not be made until the sound of the previous bell has died away. The perebor may be repeated as many times as necessary, and is tolled as the body of the deceased is carried from the temple (church building) to the grave.

=== Perezvon ===
The Perezvon (Russian: Перезвон) is the striking of each of the bells, once or several times, from largest to the smallest, with a final stroke on all at once. The pattern may be repeated many times, but the final stroke on all bells is made only at the very end.

This peal symbolizes what the Orthodox Church holds to be the kenosis (self-emptying) of God the Son when he became incarnate (Philippians 2:7–8), and is sounded only twice a year, on Great Friday and Great Saturday during those moments which recount Jesus' death on the cross and his burial.

=== Trezvon ===
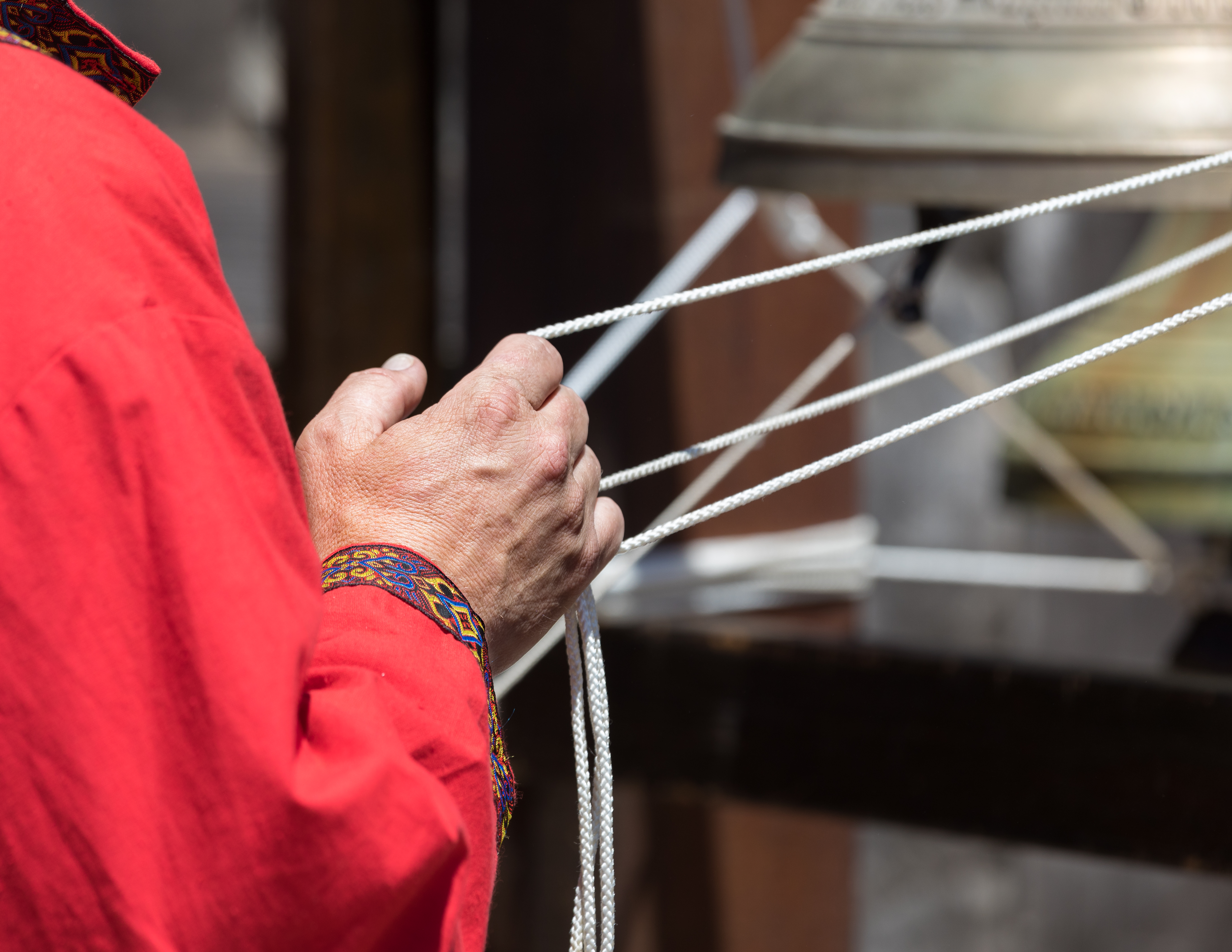
Victor Avdienko, Bell Ringer & Percussionist, San Francisco Symphony, ringing bells in front of the orthodox chapel at the Fort Ross Festival 2018, Sonoma County, California

The Trezvon (triple-peal) is the rhythmical ringing of multiple bells, using all the major groups of the bell scale. The trezvon is the most joyous of the various types of rings. The order of ringing the different bells is not fixed, but may be composed by the bell-ringer himself and prompted by his creativity and self-expression. For the trezvon, the elaborate pattern is repeated three times, with a short pause between each repetition. All three groups of bells participate in the trezvon (soprano, alto, bass), and each group has its own part in the peal. Traditionally, the meter for a trezvon is 3/4 or 4/4. The largest bell which can participate in it is the blagovestnik which was used to ring the blagovest for the given service, or a smaller bell, but not a larger one.

The trezvon is usually rung in three stages: the beginning, the zvon itself, and the finale. The beginning usually consists of three slow tolls on the blagovestnik for that day, symbolizing the Holy Trinity. The main part of the trezvon, the zvon, is often performed in several movements— one, two, or three, often called “verses”— each of which is finished with one, two, or three chords (formed by striking several select bells at once), corresponding to the number of verses. Each movement might have its own particular rhythm, dynamic, and composition. The trezvon is usually finished with three chords. The length of the trezvon is normally the length of the time it takes to read of Psalm 50; but on more festive occasions it should be longer.

The Dvuzvon (double-peal) is the same as a Trezvon, except the pattern is repeated only twice instead of three times.

== Occasions ==
The above types of zvons may be combined and rung at particular times during the same service, or used exclusively on certain occasions. The following are general guidelines, and cannot accommodate the full richness and diversity of the Russian Orthodox Church. There are also variations in local tradition.

- All-Night Vigil
- Divine Liturgy
- Holy Week and Pascha
- Feast days
- Funerals
- Victory Day (9 May) within Russia, during the playing of Slavsya and occasionally the final bars of the National Anthem of Russia
- Performances of the 1812 Overture

== Gallery ==
=== Arundel bells ===
These bells are not to be confused with the Sebastopol Bell at Windsor, although both were captured during the end of the Crimean War.

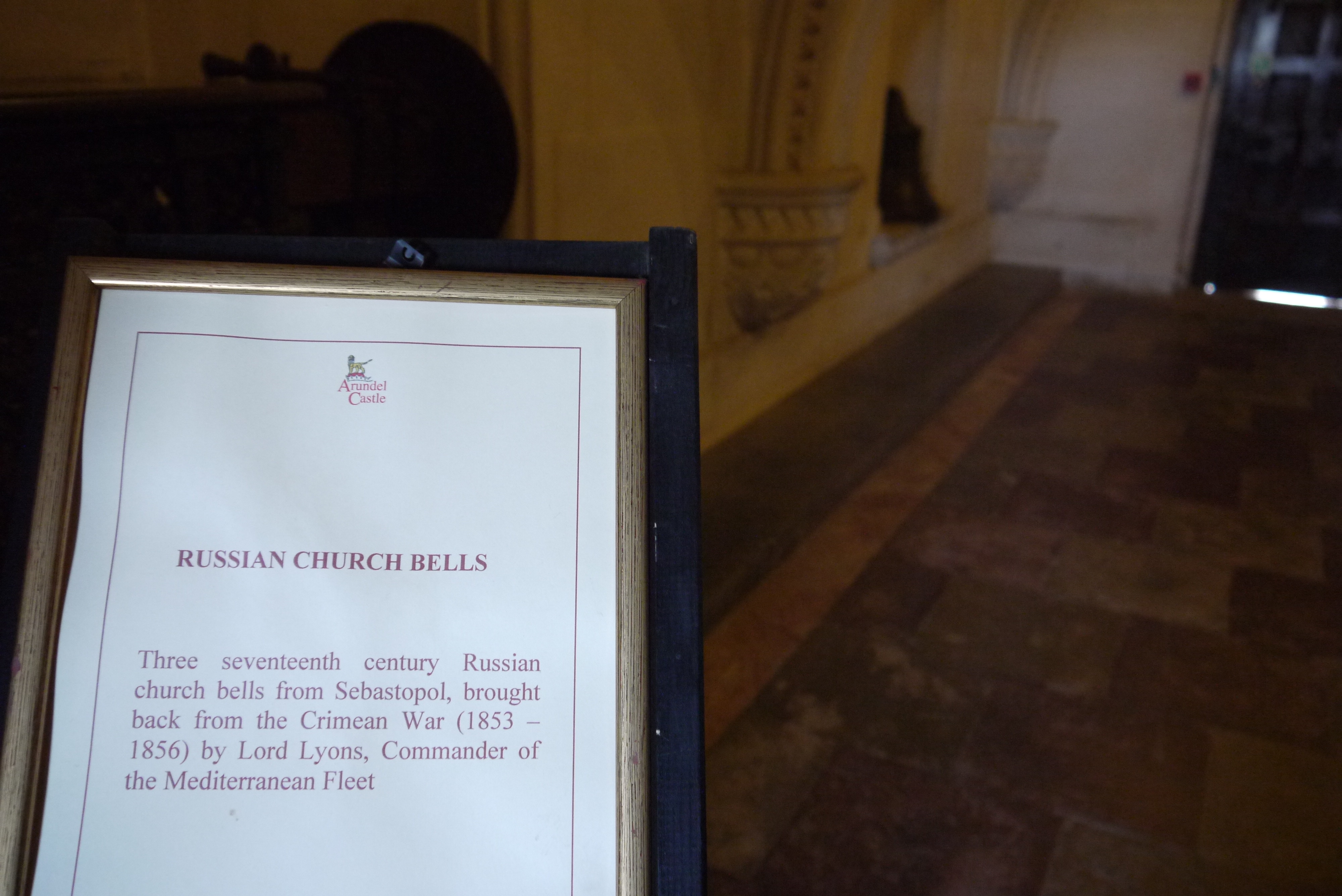
Three 17th Century Russian Orthodox Church Bells in Arundel Castle, West Sussex United Kingdom. These bells were taken as trophies from Sevastopol at the conclusion of the Crimean War in 1856.

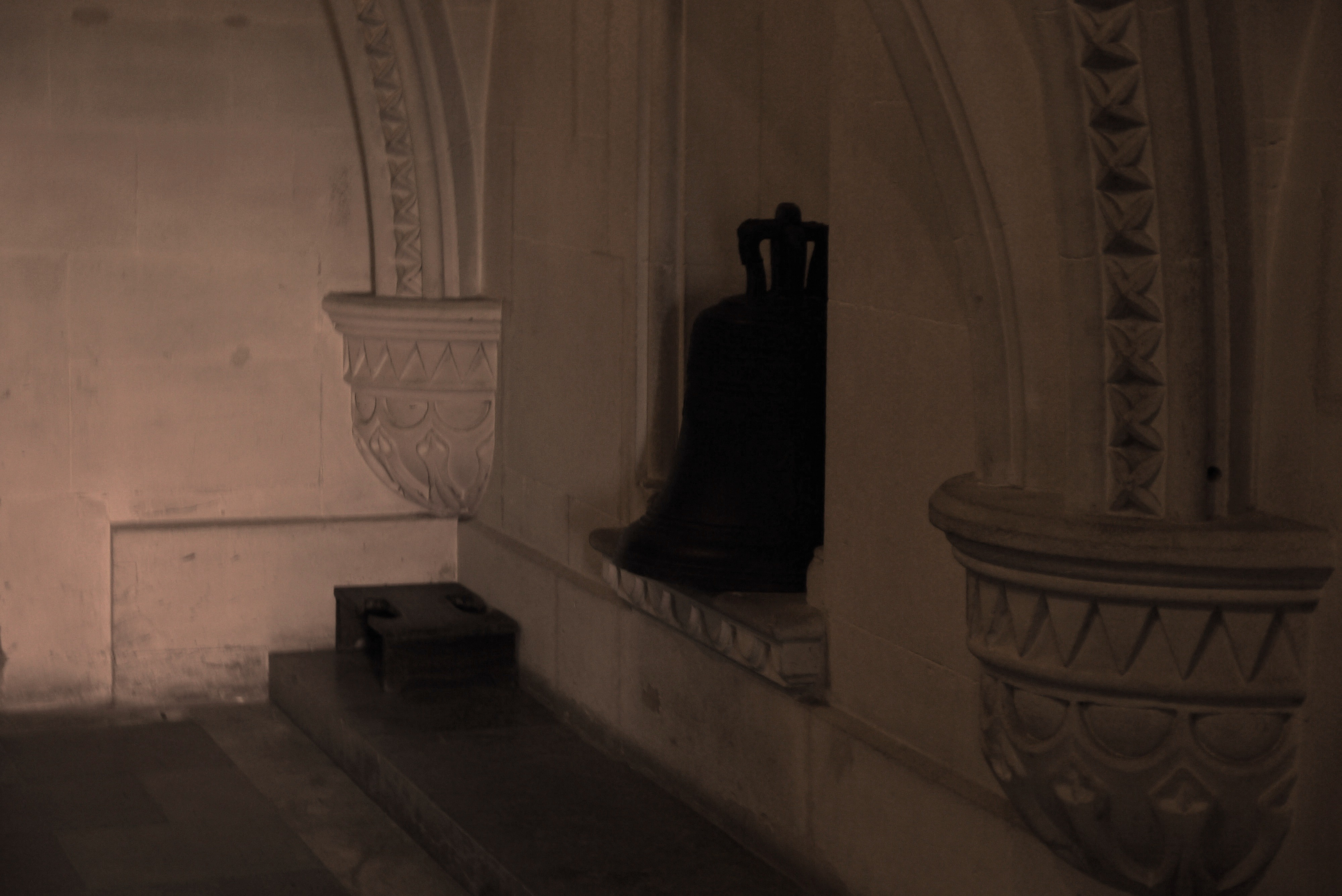
Three 17th Century Russian Orthodox Church Bells in Arundel Castle

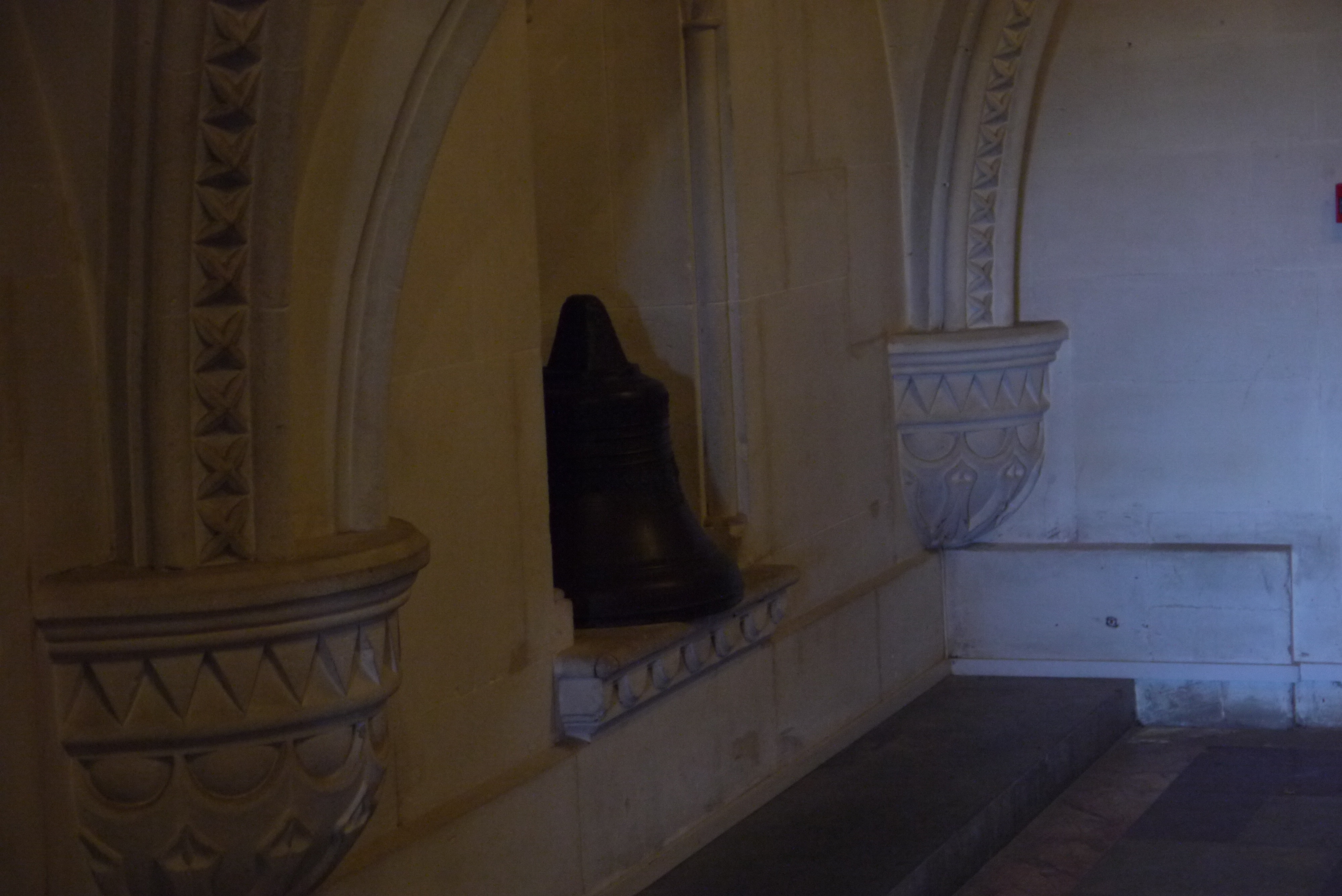
Three 17th Century Russian Orthodox Church Bells in Arundel Castle

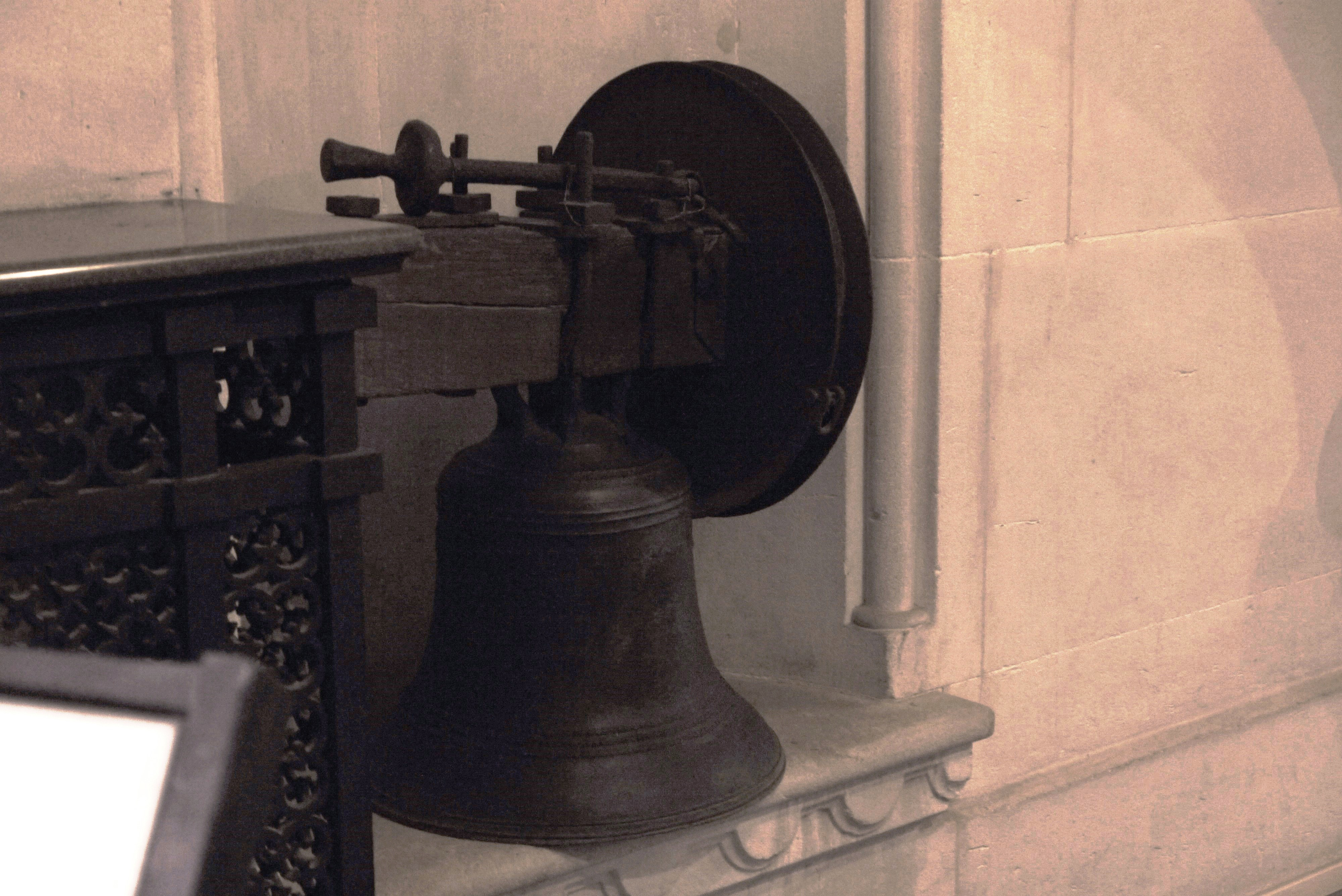
Three 17th Century Russian Orthodox Church Bells in Arundel Castle

== See also ==
- Carillon
- Chime (bell instrument)
- Full circle ringing
