= Rhodesian Independence Bell =

Rhodesian replica of the American Liberty Bell

- Prime Minister Ian Smith ceremonially rings the bell on 11 November 1966
- Location: Salisbury, Rhodesia
- Type: Tower Bell
- Material: Bronze and mukwa wood
- Height: 4 ft (1.2 m)
- Weight: 250 pounds (110 kg)
- Completion date: 1966
- Dedicated date: 11 November 1966
- Dedicated to: Rhodesian independence

The Rhodesian Independence Bell, or Rhodesian Liberty Bell, is a replica of the American Liberty Bell which was used in Rhodesia to commemorate their Unilateral Declaration of Independence. It weighed 250 pounds (110 kg) and was made in 1966 in the Netherlands and was last rung in 1978.

== Description ==
The Liberty Bell was made in the Netherlands; it is made out of bronze, is 4 feet (1.2 m) tall, weighs 250 pounds (110 kg) and is supported by Rhodesian mukwa wood. It cost £600 (equivalent to £9,760 in 2025) to make and was donated by five anonymous Rhodesians. The funding reportedly came from American conservative supporters of Rhodesia. The bell was inscribed: "I toll for justice, civilization and Christianity."

== History ==
Rhodesia had unilaterally declared its independence as a self-declared Dominion from the United Kingdom on 11 November 1965. To commemorate the first anniversary in 1966, Rhodesia held a festival known as "spirit of 76" as a tribute to being the first colony to break away from the British Empire since the Thirteen Colonies in the American War of Independence. Prime Minister Ian Smith unveiled the Liberty Bell and declared "Every time it chimes it will be another nail in the coffin of those who want to interfere in the internal affairs of Rhodesia." He then ceremonially rang it 12 times at midnight on 11 November. The ritual would be repeated each year at midnight on 11 November at an "Independence Ball" event. Smith stated that the bell would always be rung 12 times despite reports it rang once for each year of independence; to which Smith said "You can imagine what the position would be when one of my successors, in due time, has to ring the bell 100 times."

In 1979, the bell was not rung for the first time since 1966 after Smith returned to Zimbabwe Rhodesia from negotiations in London for the future Lancaster House Agreement. The bell was retired and stored in the Zimbabwe Rhodesian National Archives.
