= Manchester Universities Guild of Change Ringers =

Bellringers society

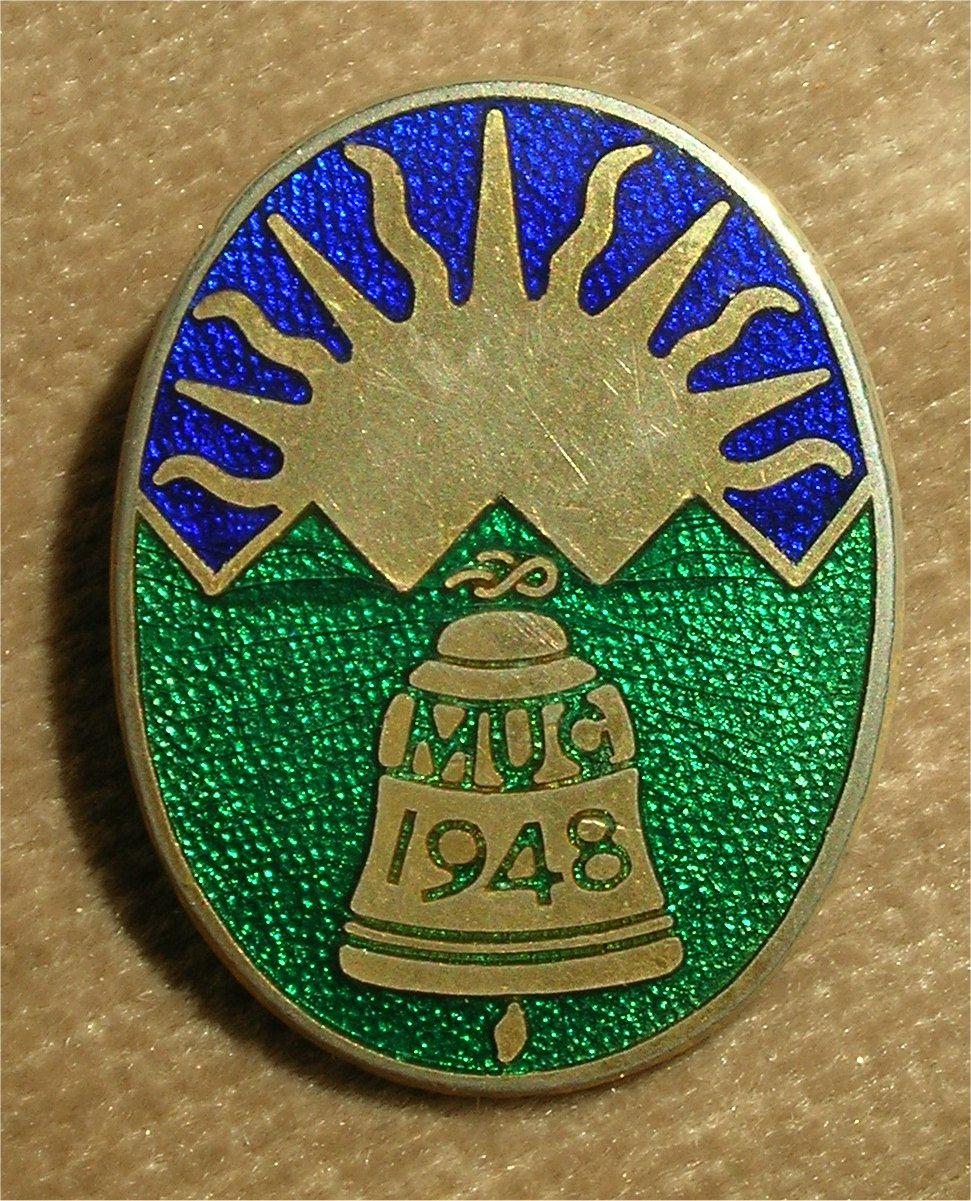
MUG lapel badge c. 1973

The Manchester Universities Guild of Change Ringers is a bell ringing guild based in Greater Manchester, whose home tower is the Sacred Trinity in Salford. Most of the members are, or have been in the past, students attending the universities and colleges in Manchester and Salford. The guild is a member of the Northern Universities Association.

== Early years ==
The guild was formed in 1948 at the Victoria University of Manchester. The first recorded peal was of Grandsire Doubles on handbells in the belfry of Christ Church, West Didsbury, Manchester on 11 January 1950.

== Expansion ==
Later, the guild acquired many associate members from UMIST, the University of Salford, MMU, and colleges in Manchester. As a result, the Guild separated from the University of Manchester Students' Union, in the process changing the original 'University' to its plural form.

MUGCR is most active around South Manchester, notably in Fallowfield, where there is a large student population.

== Achievements ==
=== 100 triples methods peal ===
On 16 May 1974 the guild completed a record-breaking peal comprising 100 triples methods with the maximum possible number of half-lead changes of method. This was to have been the greatest number of triples methods rung at the time. The peal was later shown to be technically incorrectly called and withdrawn. The guild successfully achieved the peal on 13 November 1974.

=== 360 triples methods peal ===
On 27 June 1974 the guild rang a record-breaking peal comprising 360 triples methods, the most possible. This was the most methods rung in any peal anywhere at the time with a photograph of the band appearing in the Ringing World.

=== Most half-lead spliced surprise ===
On 22 June 1975 the guild rang a peal of twelve spliced surprise methods. This was the most methods rung half-lead spliced.
