= University of Bristol Society of Change Ringers =

- UBSCR Logo
- Abbreviation: UBSCR
- Formation: 1943
- Legal status: Society
- Headquarters: St Matthew's Church
- Location: Bristol
- Coordinates: 51.457199°N 2.598424°W
- Members: Bristol Students and Alumni
- Master: Michael Shaw
- Parent organization: University of Bristol Union
- Affiliations: University of Bristol, Central Council of Church Bell Ringers
- Website: UBSCR

The University of Bristol Society of Change Ringers (UBSCR) is a change ringing society. UBSCR is associated with the University of Bristol and is affiliated to Bristol SU. UBSCR was established in 1943 and has rung bells at St Michael on the Mount Without since 1944. Since 1950 there have been over 700 peals rung for the society. UBSCR is also affiliated to the Central Council of Church Bell Ringers and sends two representatives to its AGM.

== History ==
UBSCR was founded in the Autumn Term of 1943 by Monica Richardson. Since then generations of student ringers have come and gone, contributing on the way to the development of the Society and its traditions.

The Society's first practice was held on 6 November 1943 at Long Ashton. In 1944 UBSCR moved to St Michael on the Mount, Without. The Society's first peal (5040 of Grandsire Triples) was rung on 17 May 1947. Since then UBSCR has grown. Students and former students from the Bristol area are active members.

The society home tower was St Michael on the mount, without from 1944 until 2012 when safety concerns limited the amount of ringing at St Michaels. The home tower is now St Matthews, Kingsdown. Ringing continued, albeit sporadically, at St Michaels until October 2016 when the church suffered a major fire.

== Activities ==
UBSCR holds and participates in many events throughout the course of each academic year, including the meetings of the Southern Universities Association and the Northern Universities Association, a Summer Tour, Cupid Tour (organised by the current master) and a Christmas Party, as well as a cheese and port evening and pudding party. The Annual Dinner is held on the 4th Saturday of January each year and is celebrated with the ringing of peals.

== The University Centenary ==
In 2009 the University of Bristol celebrated the centenary of being granted its Royal Charter. In celebration, Great George was rung for two minutes, and the bells of Bristol 'followed' Great George by ringing quarter peals and general change ringing. The UBSCR played a part in the celebrations of this event by ringing Great George and by helping with the other ringing.

== Great George ==
The hour bell in the Wills Memorial Building is rung, by members and friends of UBSCR to mark events and days of national importance or significance. Examples of this include Queen Elizabeth II's 90th birthday and VE day.

== Recent Masters ==
- 2026 - Present Michael Shaw
- 2025 - 2026 Annie Faulkner
- 2024 - 2025 Elizabeth Curgenven
- 2023 - 2024 Thomas Sherwood
- 2022 - 2023 Josephine Leggett
- 2021 - 2022 William Stafford
- 2020 - 2021 Anna Sherwood
- 2019 - 2020 Matthew Jerome
- 2018 - 2019 Eleanor Talbot
- 2017 - 2018 Julian Howes
- 2016 - 2017 Jed Roughley
- 2015 - 2016 Robert Beavis
- 2014 - 2015 Alex Tatlow
- 2013 - 2014 Edward Mack
- 2012 - 2013 Richard Webster
- 2011 - 2012 Richard Barclay
- 2010 - 2011 Jack Aylward
- 2009 - 2010 Edward Marchbank
- 2008 - 2009 Alan Reading
- 2007 - 2008 David Richards
- 2006 - 2007 Edward Colliss
- 2005 - 2006 Katherine Fulcher
- 2004 - 2005 Gaby Cowcill

== See also ==
- University of Bristol
- University of Bristol Union
