= Ilya Drozdihin =

Russian bell ringer (born 1978)

Ilya Drozdihin (30 September 1978, Moscow) is a bell-ringer in Moscow and director of the church bell ringers Moscow School Center of Bell Art. He is the artistic director of the Moscow festival of bells in Perezvon.

== Biography ==
He began working as a bell-ringer in 2002.

From 2003 to 2005 - bell-ringer of Patriarchal town house in Orekhovo-Borisov, Moscow.

Beginning in 2005 he served as the artistic director of the Moscow festival of bells «Perezvon».

Beginning in 2006 he served as senior bell-ringer of the Moscow Church of Our Lady «Znamenie», Moscow.

Beginning in 2008 he served as head of the School of Church Bell-Ringers.

== Festivals ==
- «Kamensk-Ural» (2005)
- «Perezvon» (2005)
- «Kamensk-Ural» (2006)
- «Alexis chimes» (2006)
- «Dnіprovsky dzvіn» (2006)
- «Perezvon» (2007)
- «Alexis chimes» (2007)
- «Kamensk-Ural» (2007)
- «Dnіprovsky dzvіn» (2007)
- «Alexis chimes» (2008)
- «Perezvon» (2008) — organizer
- «Perezvon» (2009) — organizer
- «Perezvon» (2010) — organizer
- «Perezvon» (2011) — organizer
- «Alexis chimes» (2011)

== Discography ==
- Chimes of Patriarchal town house the Millennium of Christianity in Russia, Moscow, CD (2005)
- Tsaritsyno Bells, Moscow, CD (2006)
- The Birth of a Bell, DVD (2007)
- Crystal Bells, Birobidzhan, CD (2010)
- Bells of St. Nicholas church in Buturlin, CD (2011)
- Leonov bells, Moscow, CD (2011)
- Chimes from Kaliningrad to Kamchatka, CD (2011)
- Educational film, DVD (2011)
