= Oxford Diocesan Guild of Church Bell Ringers =

Bellringers society

The Oxford Diocesan Guild of Church Bell Ringers is a society representing the rings and bell-ringers of the Diocese of Oxford who practice the art of change ringing. They cover the counties of Oxfordshire, Buckinghamshire and Berkshire and was established on 17 January 1881 at Reading.

Oxford Diocesan Guild of Church Bell Ringers logo

The Guild is split into 15 branches;

- Banbury Branch
- Bicester Branch
- Central Bucks Branch, covering Aylesbury and Winslow area
- Chiltern Branch, covering Wendover area
- Chipping Norton Branch
- East Berks and South Bucks Branch, covering the High Wycombe, Amersham and Windsor area
- Newbury Branch
- North Bucks Branch, covering Buckingham, Milton Keynes, Olney and Bletchley area
- Old North Berks Branch, covering Abingdon, Wallingford and Appleton area
- Oxford City Branch
- Reading Branch
- Sonning Deanery Branch, covering Sonning and Wokingham area
- South Oxon Branch, covering Dorchester on Thames and Thame area
- Vale of the White Horse Branch, in the Shrivenham and Faringdon area
- Witney and Woodstock Branch

== Affiliation ==
The Guild is affiliated to the Central Council of Church Bell Ringers (CCCBR), a global organisation representing all those who practice Change ringing, and currently sends five representatives to be part of the council.
