= Guild of St Magnus =

Bellringers society

The Guild of St Magnus is a bell ringing guild formed in 2009, following the new installation of the bells at St Magnus-the-Martyr, with the main aim of ringing for Sunday services at St Magnus the Martyr. Guild members are often also members of other guilds and societies in London and support other bands of ringers including: Southwark Cathedral; St Martin-in-the-Fields; St Michael, Cornhill and St Olave Hart Street.

== Home Tower ==
The Guild of St Magnus is based at St Magnus-the-Martyr, the Wren tower built in 1704 which houses a 26cwt ring of 12 bells. The bells were cast during 2008/9 by the Whitechapel Bell Foundry and were consecrated by the Bishop of London on 3 March 2009 in the presence of the Lord Mayor and the ringing dedicated on 26 October 2009 by the Archdeacon of London.

== Bells ==
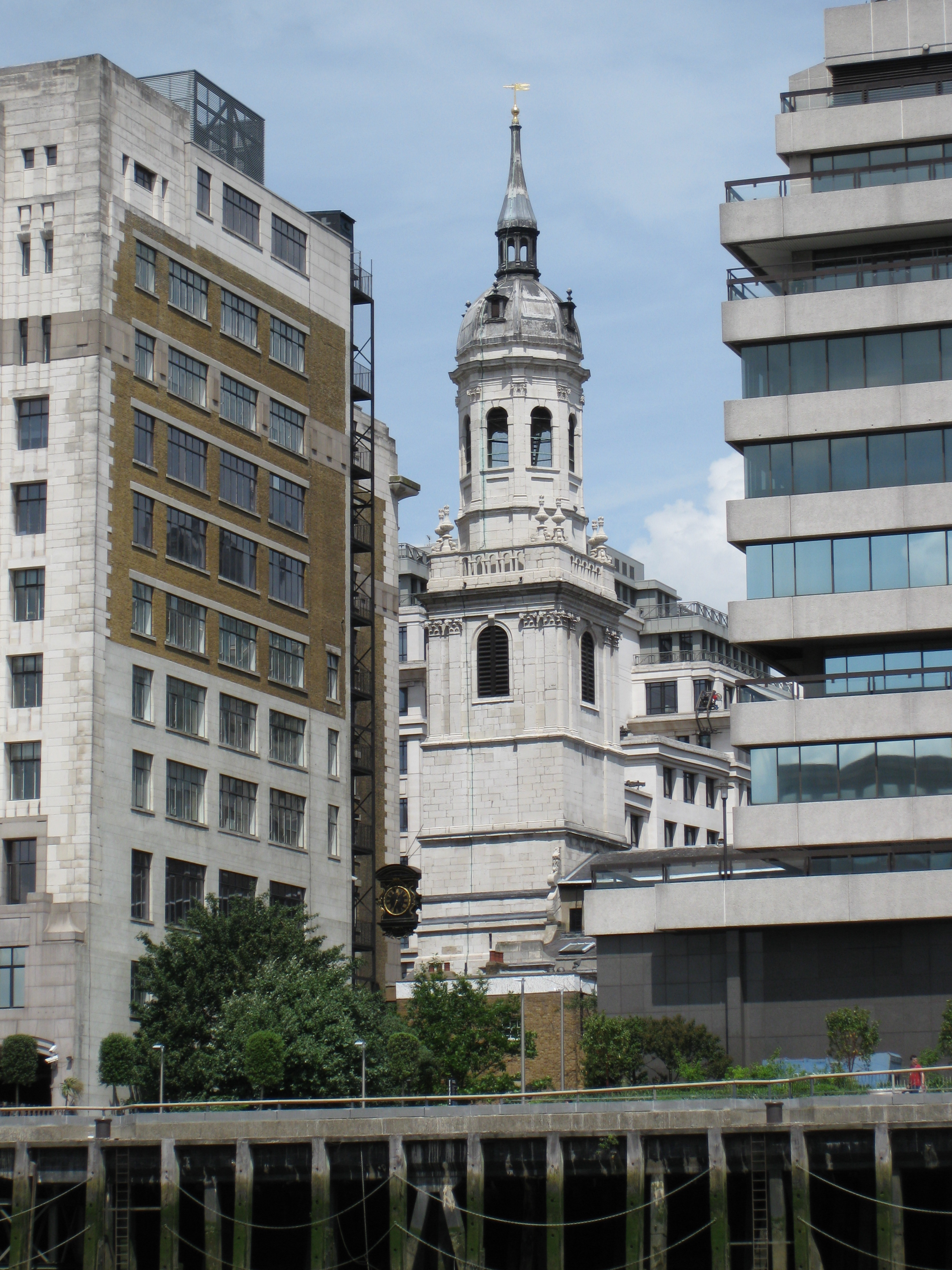
The tower of St Magnus the Martyr

Prior to the Great Fire of 1666 the old tower had a ring of five bells. The new tower was completed in 1704 and in 1714 a ring of 8 bells was installed. These were increased to 10 in 1714 with the addition of 2 trebles given by two lost ringing Societies, the Eastern Youths and the British Scholars. The 10 bells were removed for safe keeping in 1940. After the War, the bells were cleaned whereupon four of them were found to be cracked. A lack of funds and enthusiasm for the bells led to them being scrapped in 1976.

A fund was set up on 19 September 2005, led by the Ancient Society of College Youths, with a view to installing a new ring of 12 bells in the tower in a new frame. The money was raised and the bells were cast during 2008/9 by the Whitechapel Bell Foundry. They were consecrated by the Bishop of London on 3 March 2009 in the presence of the Lord Mayor and the ringing dedicated on 26 October 2009 by the Archdeacon of London. The bells project is recorded by an inscription in the vestibule of the church.

Notable recent peals have included one of Stedman Cinques on 16 April 2011 to mark the 400th anniversary of the granting of a Royal Charter to the Plumbers' Company, a peal of Cambridge Surprise Royal on 28 June 2011 when the Fishmongers' Company gave a dinner for Prince Philip, Duke of Edinburgh at their Hall on the occasion of his 90th birthday and a peal of Avon Delight Maximus on 24 July 2011 in solidarity with the people of Norway following the tragic massacre on Utoeya Island and in Oslo. On the latter occasion the flag of the Orkney Islands was flown at half mast.

The BBC television programme Still Ringing After All These Years: A Short History of Bells, broadcast on 14 December 2011, included an interview at St Magnus with the Tower Keeper, Dickon Love.

== Ringing times ==
The bells at St Magnus-the-Martyr are currently rung by the guild every Sunday, following the service, around 12.10pm.
