= University of London Society of Change Ringers =

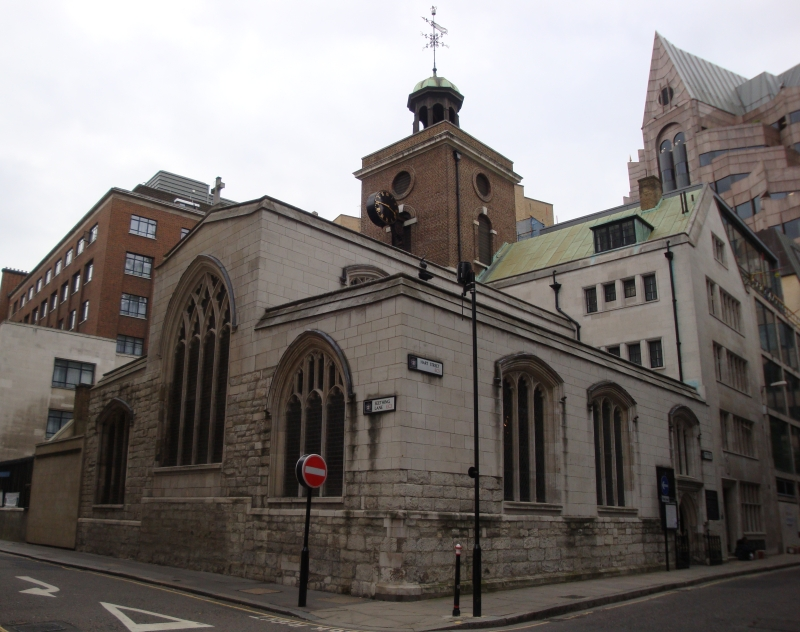
- St Olave's Church
- Abbreviation: ULSCR
- Formation: 1945
- Headquarters: St. Olave's Church, Hart Street
- Location: London
- Coordinates: 51.51084°N 0.07963°W
- Members: Students in London
- President: Ryan Noble
- Affiliations: University of London, CCCBR
- Website: ULSCR Website

The University of London Society of Change Ringers (ULSCR) is the official society dedicated to change ringing in London universities and was founded just after the end of the Second World War. The objectives of the Society are the promotion of the art and science of change ringing and ringing for church services.

Membership of the Society is open to all past/present members/employees of the University of London and any other college in London.

== Current activities ==
ULSCR ringing is based at St Olave's Church, Hart Street in the City of London. Ringing including some practices also takes place at various other towers in the London area.

The society includes ringers of all standards from rounds and call changes to spliced Maximus ringers, and also teaches students with no previous experience of ringing. It has an active social calendar including outings, picnics and parties together with an annual dinner and ringing tour during the summer holiday. The ULSCR also attends the SUA competition each year.

Annual reports are submitted to the Senate of the University of London and are also published on the ULSCR website.
