= North American Guild of Change Ringers =

Professional association in North America

The North American Guild of Change Ringers (NAGCR) was founded in 1972 after the hanging of a ring of bells in the Washington National Cathedral in Washington, D.C., United States, in 1964. The NAGCR has now grown and expanded to 52 bell towers across the United States (44 towers) and Canada (8 towers) as well as one mini-ring and 9 hand-bell groups with more than 500 members residing in North America. This organization performs the art of change ringing or method ringing, a form of campanology, in the towers and on hand-bells. This art uses mathematical sequences and patterns to change bell orders to carry out these sequences. Change ringing began in England in the 17th century.

The primary goals of the NAGCR are to improve communications among ringers in the United States and Canada, to raise to standards of change ringing, to improve North American ringers' contacts with ringers outside North America, extend the appreciation of change ringing among the general public, and to abide with the rules of the Central Council of Church Bell Ringers which is located in the United Kingdom. It also sells products including learning aids in the form of books or audio, shirts, and other souvenirs. The NAGCR provides a book service and maintains videos for rent.

== Membership ==
There are three categories of membership in the Guild.

- Resident Membership is open to all resident North American ringers. Applications shall be accompanied by a letter of sponsorship confirming that the applicant is a bell ringer or is learning to ring either tower or hand-bells. This is the only category of voting membership.
- Associate Membership is open to any resident of North America who wishes to support the purposes of the Guild. For this category of membership no sponsorship or ringing requirement is necessary.
- Non-Resident Life Membership is available to ringers not resident in North America.

== The Clapper ==
The Guild publishes a quarterly newsletter, The Clapper, that conducts ringing courses and distributes information about change ringing in North America. This service is provided to all membership levels excluding non-resident life membership. The Clapper is available in both a mailed and an electronic version.

== Officers ==
The Officers of the Guild consist of a President, a Treasurer, a Membership Secretary, a Newsletter Editor, a Peal Secretary, an Education Officer, and a Public Relations Officer. All Officers must be and have been Resident Members of the Guild for a minimum of two years continuously and immediately prior to standing for election. Officers are elected for one year terms.

== Annual General Meeting (AGM) ==
An Annual General Meeting is held annually in late Summer or early Autumn and consists of a business meeting, and nomination of officers for the next year. The AGM is usually held where there is a bell tower where changes can be rung. In addition to the business aspects, the event usually includes a ringing course, opportunities for visitors to ring, and social activities.

== See also ==
- The Australian and New Zealand Association of Bellringers
