= Central Council of Church Bell Ringers =

Organization representing ringers of church bells

- Abbreviation: CCCBR
- Formation: 28 March 1891
- Founder: Sir Arthur P. Heywood
- Founded at: Inns of Court Hotel, London UK
- Legal status: Charity
- Purpose: Promotion of Full circle ringing
- Region served: Worldwide
- President: Tina Stoecklin (2023–)
- Website: www.cccbr.org.uk

The Central Council of Church Bell Ringers (CCCBR) is an organisation founded in 1891 which represents ringers of church bells in the English style.

It acts as a co-ordinating body for education, publicity and codifying change ringing rules, also for advice on maintaining and restoring full-circle bells. Within England, where the vast majority of English-style rings are located, most towers are affiliated through local ringing associations.

The Central Council also publishes the bell ringers' weekly journal The Ringing World.

== Origins ==
Change ringing had developed rapidly in the nineteenth century helped by the formation of the many local ringing associations which had sprung up. However, the need to have a national body with general oversight was increasingly debated, and discussions took place in 1883 about forming one. The eminent ringer, the Revd F.E. Robinson, advocated a National Association to connect the many ringing associations and collect and publish ringing information and performances, but this did not gather much support.

However, the bell ringing aristocrat Sir Arthur P. Heywood still saw the need for standardisation of phraseology and change ringing methods and rules, in addition to representing the interests of ringers as a whole. He saw an alternative solution, which was to have a central "advisory" body.

Heywood contrived in 1890 to organise a dinner in Birmingham for the 80th birthday of the noted ringer Henry Johnson, to which representatives of ringing associations from around the country were invited to attend as a "national gathering". At the dinner he proposed a meeting of representatives from each association to discuss "matters of consequence".

Heywood's ideas of the aims of the prospective Council were:

1. To promote the "Exercise" (as change ringing was referred to then)
2. Maintain ringing as organised church work
3. Developing the Art (of change ringing)
4. To arbitrate on ringing rules

At the exploratory gathering in 1890 there was strong support for the concept of a central advisory and coordinating body, and the first formal meeting of the new Council took place the following year on Easter Tuesday, 28 March 1891, at the Inns of Court Hotel, London. 74 representatives were present from 33 different societies, and Sir Arthur was elected as the Council's first President.

Two Initial Committees were appointed; one to liaise with the Church Congress and a second for bells & fittings. The first meeting debated the definition of peals which was a strong current topic, and which has been debated at intervals ever since. Further debate took place in 1892 with general agreement on rules for ringing on 8, 10 and 12 bells but there was divided opinion on ringing on 5 & 6 bells. Such was the dissent that the subject of peal "Decisions" was dropped in 1897 and not raised again until 1911.

== Functions ==
Much of the Council's work is done in committee. The Council meets annually in September where major policy decisions are discussed and the reports of the many committees are received.

=== The rolls of honour ===
At the London meeting in 1921, the names of over 1,000 ringers who had perished in the War were read out. The Council instituted the first volume of Rolls of Honour which has been extended with much later research.

=== Dove's Guide for Church Bell Ringers ===
Dove's Guide is a database of church bells and towers administered by the Council. It was first published as a book in 1950 by Ronald H Dove, and transferred to the Council in 1994. It was later made available online. As of October 2023, the database has details of over 14,000 buildings and 60,000 bells.

=== Library ===
The Central Council Library is an important collection of books on bell ringing and campanology.

Sir A.P. Heywood died in 1916, and left his ringing books to the Cambridge University Guild which decided to donate them as the basis of a library for the Central Council in 1920.

The Rev. C.W.O. Jenkyn was the first librarian. He was succeeded by the Rev. Bernard Tyrwhitt-Drake of Walsoken, then by Wilfrid J. Hooton, and in 1953, Frederick Sharpe, a writer on historical aspects of bells and ringing. In 1958 Frank Perrens of Coventry was appointed and held the post until 1968.

in 1976 William T. Cook was elected, and with his appointment the rate of accessions increased. At the time of his death in 1992 there were over 2,000 catalogue entries, some representing multiple items. Thus, for instance, a set of Guild or Association reports, perhaps over 100 in number, is represented by a single catalogue number. John C. Eisel succeeded Cook in 1993 and the title changed to Steward of the Library. Since 2011 the incumbent is Alan Glover, with the library being based at his home is Shropshire. At the 2023 AGM it was agreed to transfer the library to be housed at the Loughborough Bellfoundry Trust.

== Committees ==
Most of the committees were concerned with the normal minutiae of an organisation: administration, various records/archives. However, there are some highly esoteric committees such as Methods, which is concerned with defining and recording methods and principles. It lays down the criteria for accepting peals, including quarter and half peals, which was a topic of the early council meetings.

The committees included:

- Administrative
- Methods
- Peal records
- Public relations
- Publications
- Ringing Centres
- Ringing trends
- Towers and belfries
- Tower Stewardship
- Bell restoration
- Biographies
- Compositions
- Education
- Information and communications technology
- Library

== The Ringing World ==
The Ringing World is a weekly journal devoted entirely to bell ringing and is the official journal of the Central Council for Church Bell Ringers. It is published in the UK as a paper periodical and an online edition, in 2018 it had an average weekly circulation of 2,627. It records notable ringing performances, carries features on bells, change ringing, bell towers and ringers, it is a platform for correspondence, and advertises ringing events and publishes obituaries. It is the "journal of record for performances" in ringing, and peals must be published in it.

It was first published in 1911 from Guildford as a weekly periodical to report ringing news and details of peals and quarter peals rung around the world. Its founder and first editor was John Sparkes Goldsmith, who was born at Southover, Lewes, on 13 January 1878 and died on 1 June 1942. Following his death the Central Council guaranteed the publications against losses, until in 1945 it was decided to acquire it. Subsequently, from 1983 the journal would be constituted as a self-standing charitable body but still answerable to Council members.

In 2011, celebrations of the 100 year anniversary of the magazine were held nationally, with open ringing round London churches, and a service at Westminster Abbey. Including the inaugural Ringing World National Youth Contest, a striking contest for young ringers.

== Membership ==
The members of the CCCBR are either representative, fellow, or ex-officio. There are representatives for 66 affiliated organisations from both territorial and non territorial organisations throughout the world who serve for a three-year term. The council may elect fellows as life members for services to ringing.

As of May 2020 there are 4 fellows and 12 ex-officio members.

=== List of affiliated ringing societies ===
As of May 2020, the following 66 societies are affiliated members of the Central Council.

- Ancient Society of College Youths (4 CC Reps),
- The Australian and New Zealand Association of Bellringers (4 CC Reps),
- Barrow and District Society (1 CC Reps),
- Bath and Wells Diocesan Association (5 CC Reps),
- Bedfordshire Association (3 CC Reps),
- Beverley and District Society (2 CC Reps),
- Cambridge University Guild (2 CC Reps),
- Carlisle Diocesan Guild (2 CC Reps),
- Chester Diocesan Guild (4 CC Reps),
- Coventry Diocesan Guild (4 CC Reps),
- Derby Diocesan Association (4 CC Reps),
- Devon Association (2 CC Reps),
- Devonshire Guild (4 CC Reps),
- Dorset County Association (2 CC Reps),
- Durham and Newcastle Diocesan Association (4 CC Reps),
- Durham University Society (1 CC Reps),
- East Derbyshire & West Nottinghamshire Association (1 CC Reps),
- East Grinstead and District Guild (1 CC Reps),
- Ely Diocesan Association (4 CC Reps),
- Essex Association (5 CC Reps),
- Four Shires Guild (2 CC Reps),
- Gloucester and Bristol Diocesan Association (5 CC Reps),
- Guildford Diocesan Guild (4 CC Reps),
- Hereford Diocesan Guild (4 CC Reps),
- Hertford County Association of Change Ringers (4 CC Reps),
- Irish Association (2 CC Reps),
- Kent County Association of Change Ringers (5 CC Reps),
- Ladies' Guild (3 CC Reps),
- Lancashire Association (5 CC Reps),
- Leeds University Society (1 CC Reps),
- Leicester Diocesan Guild (4 CC Reps),
- Lichfield & Walsall Archdeaconry Society (3 CC Reps),
- Lincoln Diocesan Guild (4 CC Reps),
- Liverpool Universities Society (1 CC Reps),
- Llandaff and Monmouth Diocesan Association (3 CC Reps),
- Middlesex County Association & London Diocesan Guild (4 CC Reps)
- National Police Guild (1 CC Reps),
- North American Guild of Change Ringers (4 CC Reps),
- North Staffordshire Association (2 CC Reps),
- North Wales Association (2 CC Reps),
- Norwich Diocesan Association (4 CC Reps),
- Oxford Diocesan Guild of Church Bell Ringers (6 CC Reps),
- Oxford Society of Change Ringers (1 CC Reps),
- Oxford University Society of Change Ringers (1 CC Reps),
- Peterborough Diocesan Guild (4 CC Reps),
- Salisbury Diocesan Guild (5 CC Reps),
- Scottish Association (2 CC Reps),
- Shropshire Association (2 CC Reps),
- Society of Royal Cumberland Youths (4 CC Reps),
- Society of Sherwood Youths (1 CC Reps),
- South African Guild (1 CC Reps),
- Southwell and Nottingham Diocesan Guild (4 CC Reps),
- St Agatha's Guild (1 CC Reps),
- St David's Diocesan Guild (1 CC Reps),
- St Martin's Guild for the Diocese of Birmingham (2 CC Reps)
- Suffolk Guild of Ringers (4 CC Reps),
- Surrey Association (4 CC Reps),
- Sussex County Association (5 CC Reps),
- Swansea and Brecon Diocesan Guild (2 CC Reps),
- Truro Diocesan Guild (4 CC Reps),
- University of Bristol Society of Change Ringers (2 CC Reps),
- University of London Society of Change Ringers (1 CC Reps),
- Veronese, Associazione Suonatori di Campane a Sistema (Italy) (2 CC Reps),
- Winchester and Portsmouth Diocesan Guild (5 CC Reps),
- Worcestershire and Districts Association (4 CC Reps),
- Yorkshire Association (5 CC Reps).

== Presidents ==
- 1891–1916 Sir Arthur Percival Heywood
- 1918–1921 Rev. Anchitel H. F. Boughey
- 1921–1930 Rev. Canon George F. Coleridge
- 1930–1957 Edwin H. Lewis
- 1957–1963 Frederick Sharpe
- 1963–1969 Rev. Canon A. Gilbert G. Thurlow
- 1969–1975 John Freeman
- 1975–1981 Edwin A. Barnett
- 1981–1984 Rev. John G. M. Scott
- 1984–1987 Philip A. Corby
- 1987–1990 Rev. Dr. John C. Baldwin
- 1990–1993 Christopher J. Groome
- 1993–1996 Prof. Ronald J. Johnston
- 1996–1999 M. Jane Wilkinson
- 1999–2002 John A. Anderson
- 2002–2005 Dr. Michael J. de C. Henshaw
- 2005–2008 Derek E. Sibson
- 2008–2011 Anthony P. Smith
- 2011–2014 Kate N. Flavell
- 2014–2017 Christopher F. Mew
- 2017–2019 Dr. Christopher D. O’Mahony
- 2019–2023 Simon J. L. Linford
- 2023–present Tina Stoecklin

== See also ==
- Dove's Guide for Church Bell Ringers
