= Peal =

Type of precisely timed bell-ringing arrangement

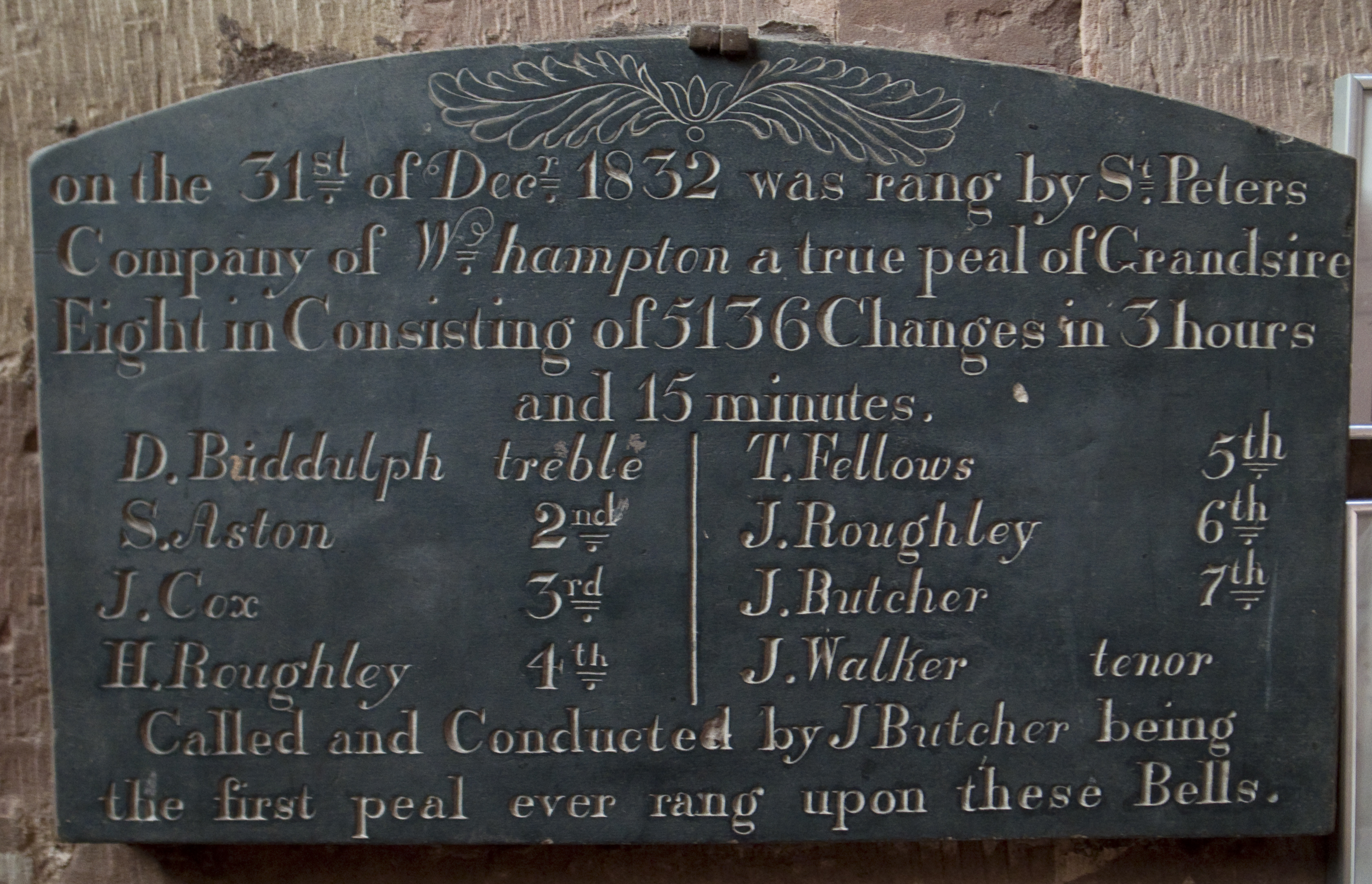
Peal board in St Michael and All Angels' church, Penkridge, Staffordshire, recording the first peal on the new bells in 1832

In campanology (bell ringing), a peal is the special name given to a specific type of performance of change ringing which meets certain exacting conditions for duration, complexity and quality.

The definition of a peal has changed considerably over the years and its standardisation was one of the motivating factors in the formation of the Central Council of Church Bell Ringers in 1891. Currently, for a performance to be recognised as a peal by the Central Council it must consist of sufficient numerical sequences, or "changes" (at least 5,040 changes on up to seven working bells or 5,000 changes on higher numbers), meet a number of other criteria (collectively referred to as the decisions), and be published in The Ringing World.

On typical tower bells a peal takes around three hours to ring; the time depends on several factors including the number of changes and the weight of the bells, which affects the speed of ringing.

In addition to ordinary peals, ringers often ring quarter-peals, which are a quarter of the length of a full peal, making them easier to ring as most quarter-peals take around 45 minutes to complete.

A ring of English-style full-circle bells is sometimes referred to as a peal of bells.

== Historic meaning ==
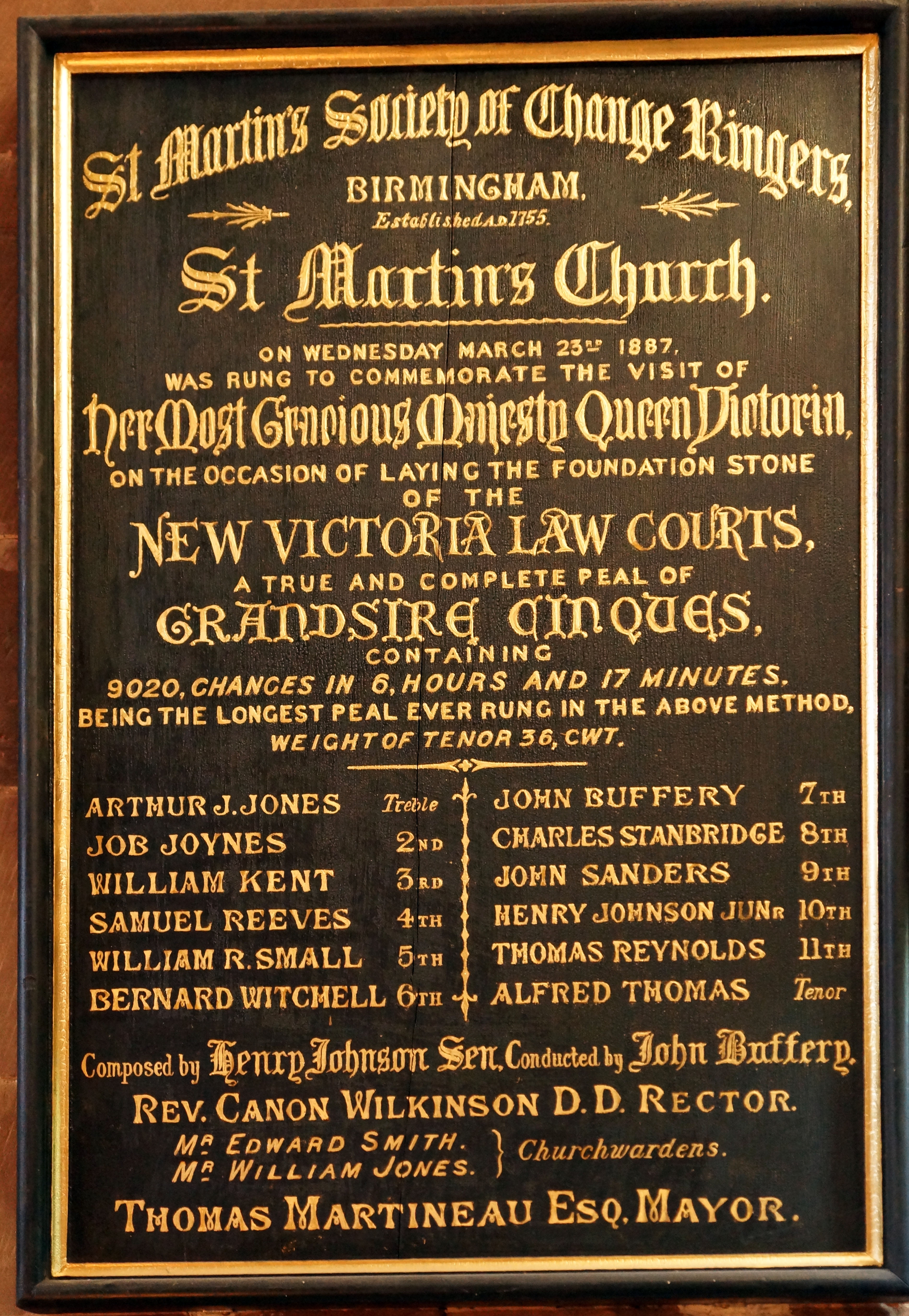
A peal board recording the details of a long length peal.

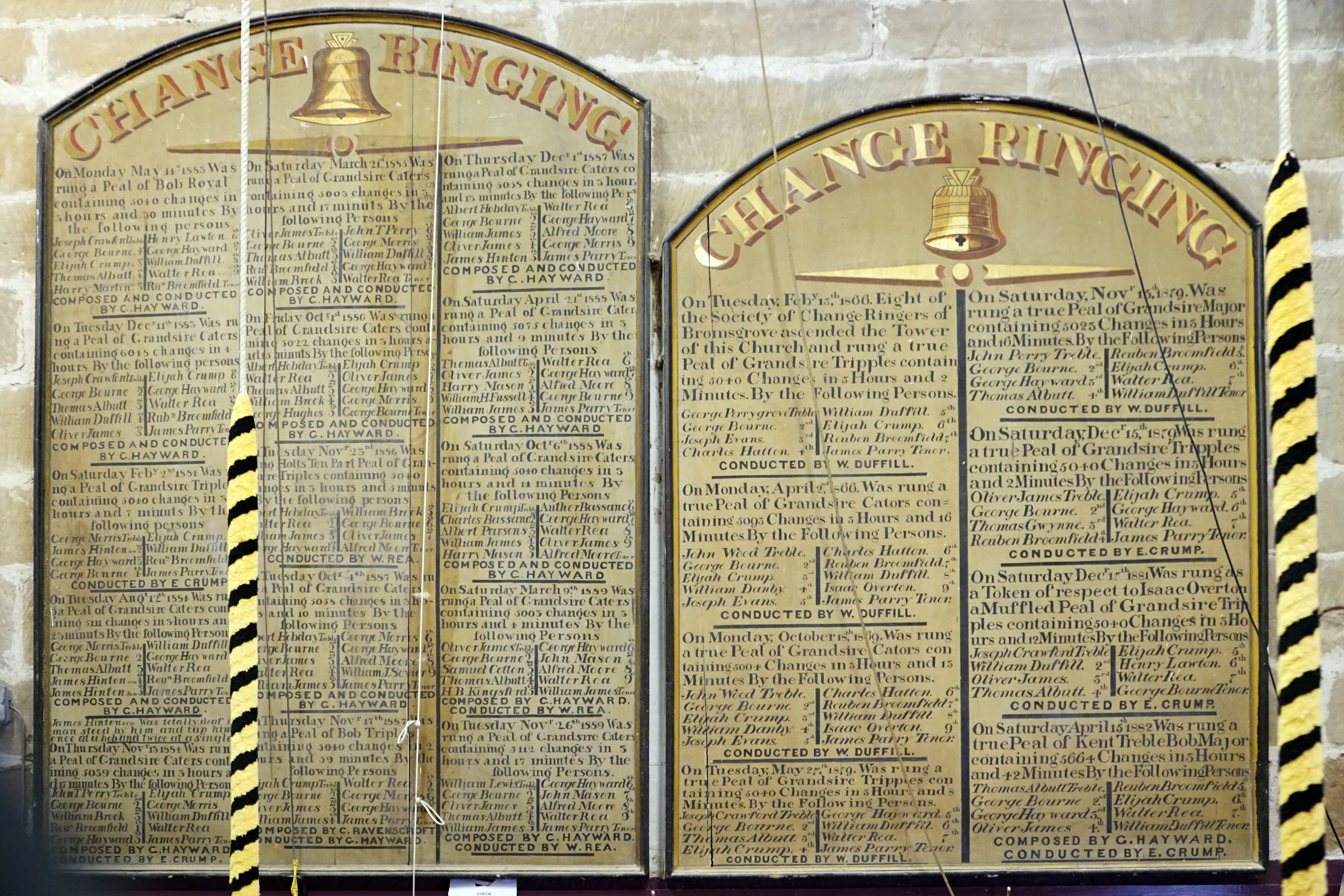
Multiple peals on two boards

Originally a peal referred to a sequence of changes of any length, now often referred to as a touch. A touch being more than a plain course, but not a quarter or full peal. However, the original meaning is still in use today in call-change ringing. The most famous and frequently rung call-change peal, associated with the Devon Association of ringers, is named 60 on 3rds.

Following the invention of the ringing method known as Grandsire Doubles, the term peal or "full peal" was applied to the ringing of sequences including each possible permutation of the set of bells exactly once. On five bells (Doubles), there are 120 permutations taking about four minutes to ring on tower bells. This is arrived at by the calculation 1 × 2 × 3 × 4 × 5 = 5! = 120 unique permutations. These figures rapidly increase as more bells are added.

With the standardisation of the term "peal", ringing all possible permutations is referred to as the "extent". For seven bells the extent is 7! = 5,040 changes and is thus synonymous with a peal. For lower numbers of bells several extents are rung to make up the number of changes in a peal. For larger numbers of bells a peal is a subset of the extent.

The extent on eight bells comprises 40,320 changes, and would be referred to today as a long-length peal. Despite this, it has been successfully rung as a continuous performance both on tower and on hand bells, 17 hours in duration on tower bells.

== Relationship of extents and peals ==
Changing Bells	Stage name	Unique changes possible (extent)
5	Doubles	120 (42 extents = peal)
6	Minor	720 (7 extents = peal)
7	Triples	5,040 (1 extent = peal)
8	Major	40,320 (8 peals = extent)

== Modern peal standards ==
Method ringing peals today consist of a minimum length of between 5000 and 5280 changes, or permutations, depending on the method, and the number of bells.

The first method ringing peal in this modern sense took place at St Peter Mancroft Church in Norwich, in 1715, and was in the method "Grandsire Bob Triples", which is equivalent to the modern Plain Bob Triples. This is the earliest known record of a "full peal" which was "true" – that is, did not have any repeated changes – and was over 5,000 changes.

There is a long list of rules which have been developed since 1890. To be classified as a peal, a performance must be in accordances with rules and decisions of the Central Council of Church Bell Ringers, allowing them to be recorded in that organisation’s peal records. They must also be published in The Ringing World. The Central Council has two committees which are arbiters of the standards that peals must achieve:

- Methods committee
- Peal records committee

Some key conditions required for all peals are:

- A peal shall start and end with rounds (bells sounding in numerical, ascending order), and shall be rung without interval.
- No row shall be struck more than once before the next change is made.
- Every bell must sound at every row throughout the peal.
- Each bell must be rung continuously by the same person or persons.
- For handbells the bells shall be retained in hand.
- For tower bells the bells shall be audible outside the building in which they are contained.
- No assistance of any kind shall be given to any ringer by any person not ringing in the peal.
- The use of physical aids to memory in conducting and ringing is not permitted.
- No error in calling shall be corrected later than during the change at which the call or change of method or non-method block would properly take effect.
- Any shift or error in ringing shall be corrected immediately.

=== Challenges in ringing a peal ===
Peals on tower bells can take anywhere from two and a half to over four hours to ring, depending on the weight of the bells. Handbell peals are shorter for equivalent changes. They are both a physical and mental challenge, as concentration has to be maintained for a long period of time, and each individual ringer has to ring their bell without a break, and depending on ringing style and bell weight can cause physical tiredness.

Composition of peals is a specialised and highly complicated area of change ringing, as it involves composing a peal according to the rules. The "Conductor" of the peal has to:

- Control and ring their own bell in the correct sequence
- Correct other ringers if they go wrong
- Call the "bobs" and "singles" which are the "composition" – the equivalent of a musical score – that ensures the correct changes are rung in the correct sequence.

A peal can fail at any point if there is a mix-up of bells which cannot be put right; this can happen only minutes from the end.

== Popularity of 10-bell methods ==
According to the best available knowledge in 2017, 6,929 peals of Grandsire Caters (on 10 bells) were rung in the 300 years following 11 January 1711. Grandsire Caters was the leading 10-bell method in each decade from 1711 to 1890, but Stedman Caters has proved more popular recently and on 9 July 2010 its cumulative peal total from 1711 pulled ahead of the running Grandsire total.

== Long-length peals ==
Another area of peal ringing is that of long-length peals. These involve ringing for far longer than an ordinary peal, up to 17 hours. The difficulties of ringing ordinary peals are magnified in these performances, as are the difficulties of composing them. One challenge to ringers is to ring 'the extent', which on eight bells is 40,320 changes. The last time this was rung on tower bells, it took 18 hours.

== Raising and lowering in peal ==
"Raising in peal" does not refer to ringing a peal, but is the process where a band of ringers increases the swing of tower bells from mouth down to mouth upwards while keeping them ringing in rounds. The opposite process is "lowering in peal", where the swing of the bells is gradually reduced until they are at rest mouth downwards, again keeping the bells ringing in rounds throughout.

== Quarter peal ==
Quarter peals are also commonly rung, and are popular for service ringing, where a full peal would be time-consuming. These generally meet most of the rules for a peal, but need be only a quarter the length (i.e. at least 1,260 or 1,250 changes, depending on the number of bells). Quarter peals are often developmental while a ringer progresses towards a full peal, and consist of roughly 1260 changes. The Ringing World recorded between 13,000 and 14,000 quarter peals per year in 2006.

== Records of peals ==
Many notable peals are also recorded on peal boards attached to the walls of the ringing rooms in the towers where they took place, and in the peal books of local change-ringing associations.

The Felstead database is an on-line searchable resource for all peal records.
