= Campanology =

Scientific and musical study of bells

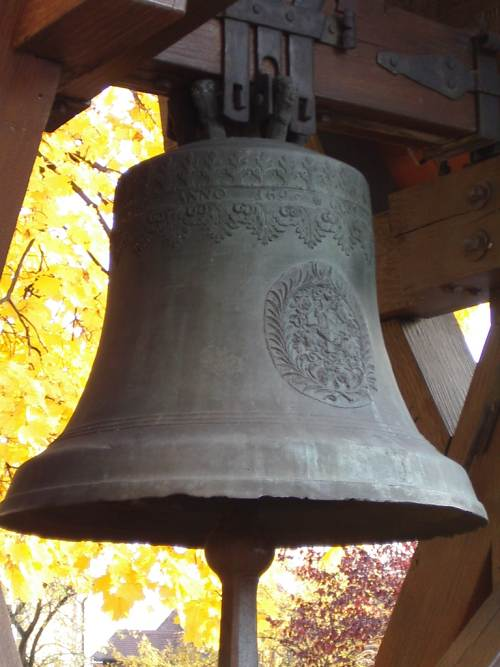
A bell

Campanology (/kæmpəˈnɒlədʒi/) is the scientific and musical study of bells. It encompasses the technology of bells—how they are founded, tuned and rung—as well as the history, methods, and traditions of bellringing as an art.

It is common to collect together a set of tuned bells and treat the whole as one musical instrument. Such collections—such as a Flemish carillon, a Russian zvon, or an English "ring of bells" used for change ringing—have their own practices and challenges; and campanology is likewise the study of perfecting such instruments and composing and performing music for them.

In this sense, however, the word campanology is most often used in reference to relatively large bells, often hung in a tower. It is not usually applied to assemblages of smaller bells, such as a glockenspiel, a collection of tubular bells, or an Indonesian gamelan.

== Etymology and definition ==
Campanology is a hybrid word. The first half is derived from the Late Latin campana, meaning 'bell'; the second half is derived from the Ancient Greek -λογία (-logia) meaning 'the study of'.

A campanologist is one who studies campanology, though it is popularly misused to refer to a bell ringer.

== Forms of bellringing ==
=== Full circle ringing ===
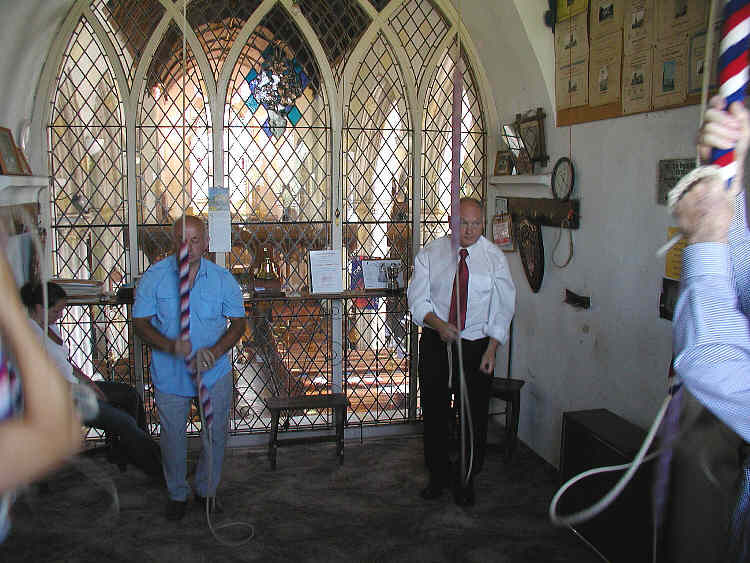
Change ringing in a church in Devon, England

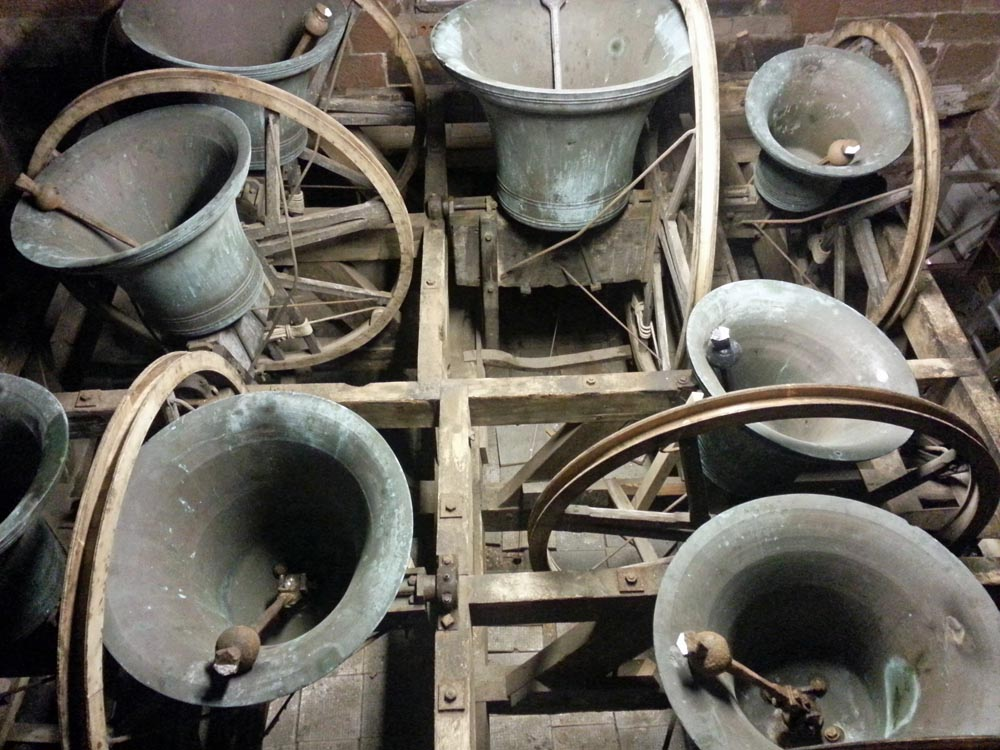
The bells of St Bees Priory, England shown in the "up" position. When being rung they swing through a full circle from mouth upwards round to mouth upwards, and then back again.

In English style (see below) full circle ringing, the bells in a church tower are hung so that on each stroke the bell swings through a complete circle; actually a little more than 360 degrees. Between strokes, it briefly sits poised 'upside-down', with the mouth pointed upwards; pulling on a rope connected to a large diameter wheel attached to the bell swings it down and the assembly's own momentum propels the bell back up again on the other side of the swing. Each alternate pull or stroke is identified as either handstroke or backstroke—handstroke where the "sally" (the fluffy area covered with wool) is pulled followed by a pull on the plain "tail". At East Bergholt in the English county of Suffolk, there is a unique set of bells that are not in a tower and are rung full circle by hand. They are the heaviest ring of five bells listed in Dove's Guide for Church Bell Ringers. The heaviest bell is 26 long cwt 0 qr 8 lb (2,920 lb or 1,324 kg) and the bells have a combined weight of 4 long tons 5 cwt 2 qr 24 lb (9,600 lb or 4.354 t).

These rings of bells have relatively few bells, compared with a carillon; six or eight-bell towers are common, with the largest rings numbering up to sixteen bells. The bells are usually tuned to a diatonic scale without chromatic notes; they are traditionally numbered from the top downwards so that the highest bell (called the treble) is numbered 1 and the lowest bell (the tenor) has the highest number; it is usually the tonic note of the bells' scale.

To swing the heavy bells requires a ringer for each bell. Furthermore, the great inertias involved mean that a ringer has only a limited ability to retard or accelerate their bell's cycle. Along with the relatively limited palette of notes available, the upshot is that such rings of bells do not easily lend themselves to ringing melodies.

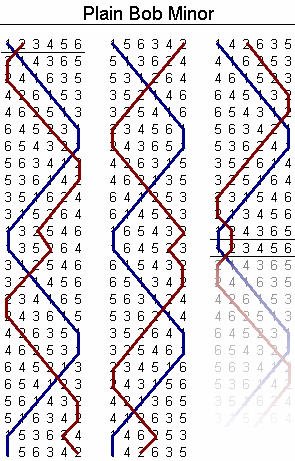
This is a diagram of one type of method ringing. Each bell strikes once in every sequence, or change, and repetition is avoided. Here 1 is the highest-pitched, and 6 is the lowest

Instead, a system of change ringing evolved, particularly in the early seventeenth century, which centres on mathematical permutations. The ringers begin with rounds, which is simply ringing down the scale in numerical order. (On six bells this would be 123456.) The ringing then proceeds in a series of rows or changes, each of which is some permutation of rounds (for example 214365) where no bell changes by more than one position from the preceding row (this is also known as the Steinhaus–Johnson–Trotter algorithm).

In call change ringing, one of the ringers (known as the Conductor) calls out to tell the other ringers how to vary their order. The timing of the calls and changes of pattern accompanying them are made at the discretion of the Conductor and so do not necessarily involve a change of ringing sequence at each successive stroke as is characteristic of method ringing. Some ringers, notably in the West of England where there is a strong call-change tradition, ring call changes exclusively but for others, the essence of change ringing is the substantially different method ringing. As of 2025 there are 7,255 English style rings. Wales having 230, Scotland 25, and the island of Ireland 61. The Channel Islands has 13 and the Isle of Man 2. 7 in Mainland Europe, 60 in North America, 2 in the Caribbean, 13 in Africa. Australia 72 and New Zealand 11. The remaining 6759 (93%) are in England (including several mobile rings).

==== Veronese bell ringing ====
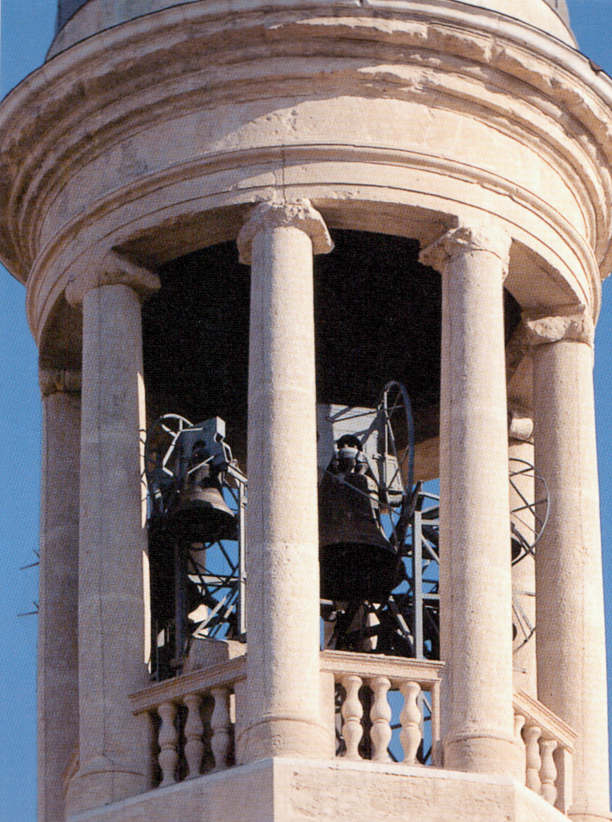
The bell chamber in the campanile of San Massimo, Verona

Veronese bell ringing is a style of ringing church bells that developed around Verona, Italy, from the eighteenth century. The bells are manually rung full circle (mouth uppermost to mouth uppermost), being held up by a rope and wheel until a note is required.

==== Bolognese bell ringing ====
Bolognese bell ringing (Italian: sistema bolognese, suono alla bolognese, arte campanaria bolognese or campaneria bolognese) is a traditional system of manual bell ringing developed in Bologna, Italy. It is a form of full circle, manual ringing in which bells are swung to produce rhythmic patterns. Its characteristic performances take place inside the bell chamber, with bell-ringers standing close to the bells, wooden frames, short ropes and clappers.

The system includes three main families of ringing: doppio, tirabasse and scampanio. The doppio, especially in its a trave and a cappio forms, is the central full-circle technique of the Bolognese tradition. The tradition is generally traced to the bell tower of the Basilica of San Petronio in the second half of the 16th century.

From Bologna, the system spread to parish bell towers in the surrounding territory, including the plain, hills and Apennine area. In 2025, Bolognese bell ringing was recognized by the Municipality of Bologna as a De.Co. traditional knowledge practice. It is also connected with the wider tradition of manual bell ringing, inscribed in 2024 on UNESCO's Representative List of the Intangible Cultural Heritage of Humanity as the transnational element Manual bell ringing.

==== Change ringing ====
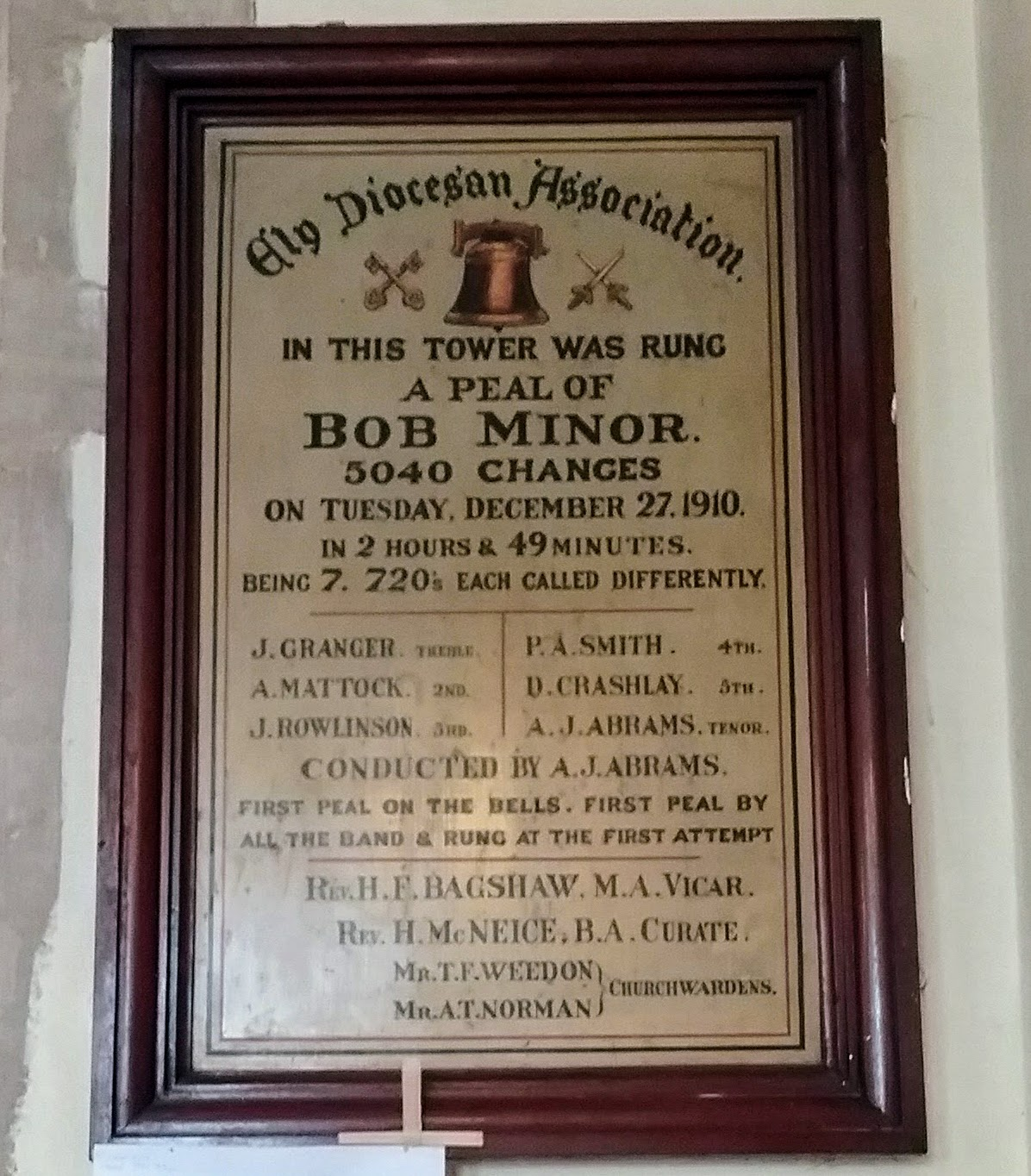
Peal board at St Peter and St Paul Church, Chatteris, Cambridgeshire, commemorating the ringing of a peal in 1910; 5,040 changes were rung in two hours and forty-nine minutes.

Change ringing is the art of ringing a set of tuned bells in a tightly controlled manner to produce precise variations in their successive striking sequences, known as "changes". This can be by method ringing in which the ringers commit to memory the rules for generating each change, or by call changes, where the ringers are instructed how to generate each change by a conductor. This creates a form of bell music which cannot be discerned as a conventional melody, but is a series of mathematical sequences.

Change ringing originated following the invention of English full-circle tower bell ringing in the early 17th century, when bell ringers found that swinging a bell through a much larger arc than that required for swing-chiming gave control over the time between successive strikes of the clapper. Ordinarily a bell will swing through a small arc only at a set speed governed by its size and shape in the nature of a simple pendulum, but by swinging through a larger arc approaching a full circle, control of the strike interval can be exercised by the ringer. This culminated in the technique of full circle ringing, which enabled ringers to independently change the speeds of their individual bells accurately to combine in ringing different mathematical permutations, known as "changes".

Speed control of a tower bell is exerted by the ringer only when each bell is mouth upwards and moving slowly near the balance point; this constraint and the intricate rope manipulation involved normally requires that each bell have its own ringer. The considerable weights of full-circle tower bells also means they cannot be easily stopped or started and the practical change of interval between successive strikes is limited. This places limitations on the rules for generating easily-rung changes; each bell must strike once in each change, and its position of striking in successive changes can only change by one place.

Change ringing is practised worldwide, but it is by far most common on church bells in English churches, where it first developed. Change ringing is also performed on handbells, where conventionally each ringer holds two bells, and chimed on carillons and chimes of bells, though these are more commonly used to play conventional melodies.

===== Method ringing =====
In method or scientific ringing each ringer has memorized a pattern describing his or her bell's course from row to row; taken together, these patterns (along with only occasional calls made by a conductor) form an algorithm which cycles through the various available permutations dictated by the number of bells available. There are hundreds of these methods which have been composed over the centuries and all have names, some being very fanciful. Better-known examples such as Plain Bob, Reverse Canterbury, Grandsire and Double Oxford are familiar to most ringers.

Serious ringing always starts and ends with rounds; and it must always be true—each row must be unique, never repeated. A performance of a few hundred rows or so is called a touch. A performance of all the possible permutations possible on a set of bells is called an extent, with $n$ bells there are $n$! possible permutations. With five bells 5! = 120 which takes about 5 minutes. With seven bells 7! = 5,040 which takes about three hours to ring. This is the definition of a full peal on 7 (5,000 or more for other numbers of bells.) Less demanding is the quarter peal of 1,260 changes. When ringing peals and quarter peals on fewer bells several complete extents are rung consecutively. When ringing on higher numbers of bells less than a complete extent is rung. On eight bells the extent is 8!=40,320 which has only been accomplished once, taking nearly nineteen hours.

Ringing in English belltowers became a popular hobby in the late 17th century, in the Restoration era; the scientific approach which led to modern method ringing can be traced to two books of that era, Tintinnalogia or the Art of Ringing (published in 1668 by Richard Duckworth and Fabian Stedman) and Campanalogia (also by Stedman; first released 1677; see Bibliography). Today change ringing remains most popular in England but is practiced worldwide; over four thousand peals are rung each year.

Dorothy L. Sayers's mystery novel The Nine Tailors (1934) centres around change ringing of bells in a Fenland church; her father was a clergyman.

=== Russian Orthodox bellringing ===
Bell-ringer demonstrating Russian chiming on a portable belfry

The bells in Russian tradition are sounded by their clappers, attached to ropes; a special system of ropes is developed individually for every belltower. All the ropes are gathered in one place, where the bell-ringer stands. The ropes (usually all ropes) are not pulled, but rather pressed with hands or legs. Since one end of every rope is fixed, and the ropes are kept in tension, a press or even a punch on a rope makes a clapper move.

The Russian Tsar Bell is the largest extant bell in the world.

=== Carillons ===
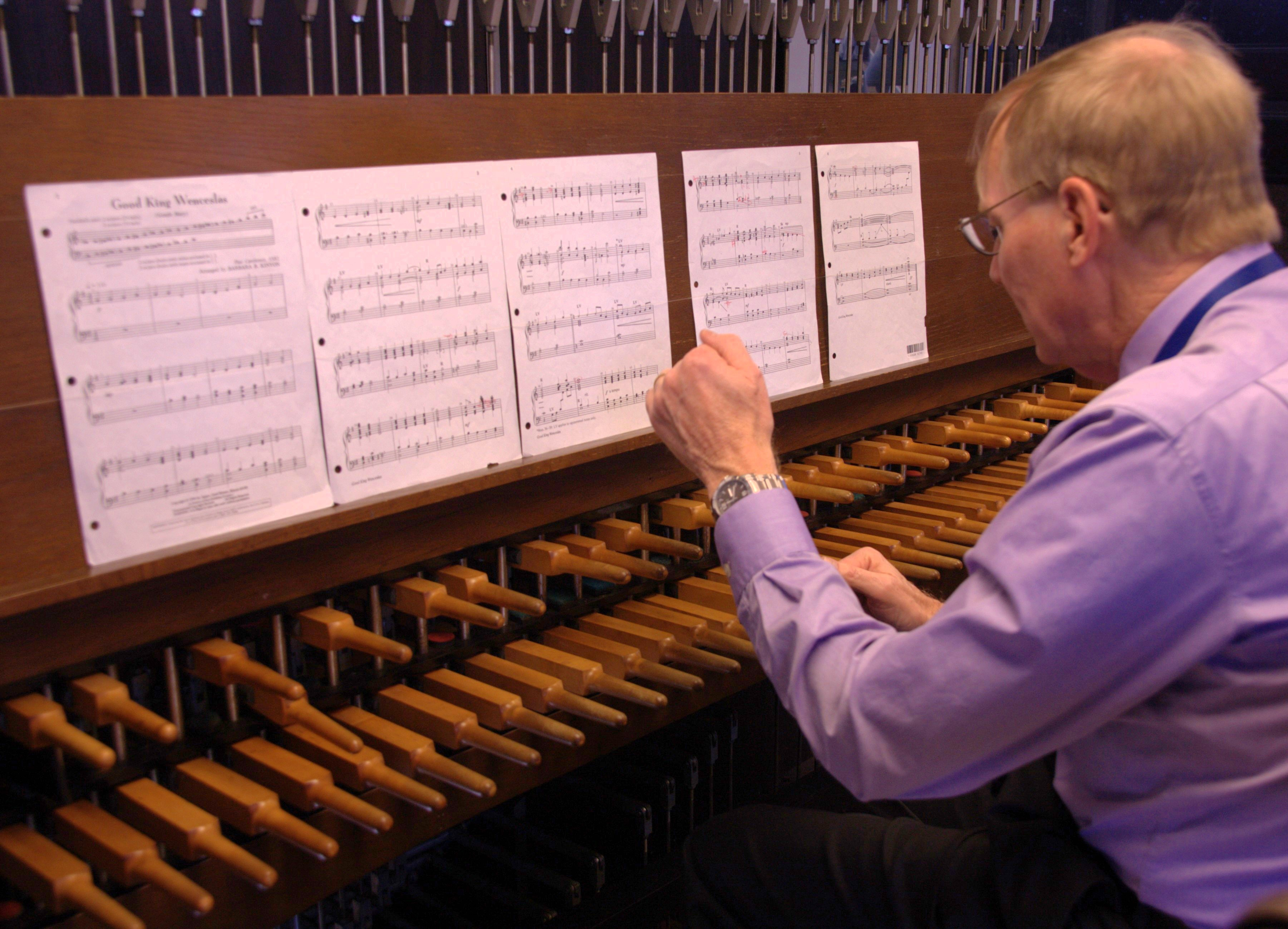
A carillonist plays the 56-bell carillon of the Plummer Building in Rochester, Minnesota, US

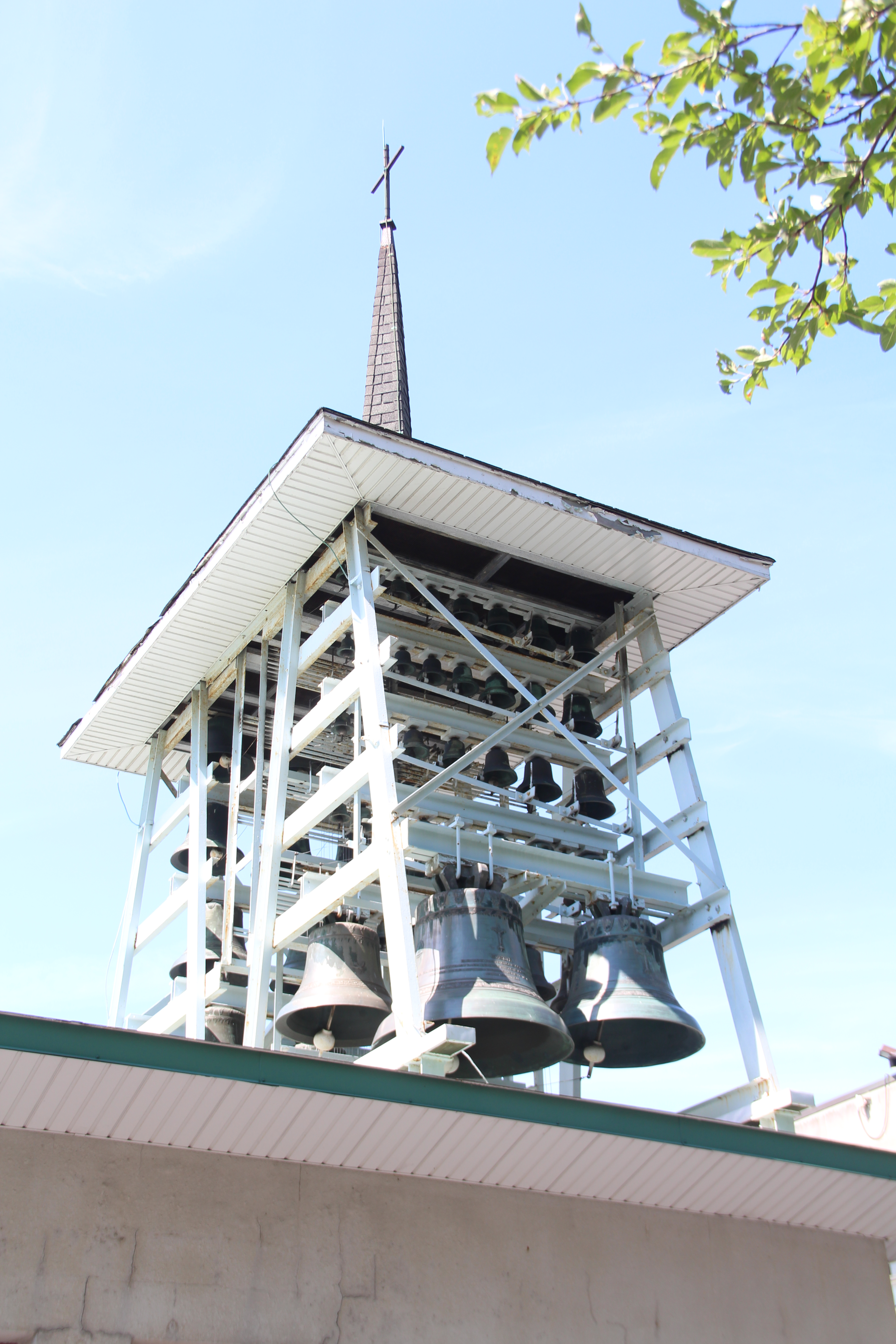
The 56-bell carillon of Saint Joseph's Oratory in Montreal, Quebec, Canada

A carillon is a pitched percussion instrument that is played with a keyboard and consists of at least 23 bells. The bells are cast in bronze, hung in fixed suspension, and tuned in chromatic order so that they can be sounded harmoniously together. They are struck with clappers connected to a keyboard of wooden batons played with the hands and pedals played with the feet. Often housed in bell towers, carillons are usually owned by churches, universities, or municipalities. They can include an automatic system through which the time is announced and simple tunes are played throughout the day.

Carillons come in many designs, weights, sizes, and sounds. They are among the world's heaviest instruments, and the heaviest carillon weighs over 91 metric tons (100 short tons). Most weigh between 4.5 and 15 metric tons (5.0 and 16.5 short tons). To be considered a carillon, a minimum of 23 bells is needed; otherwise, it is called a chime. Standard-sized instruments have about 50, and the world's largest has 77 bells. The appearance of carillons depends on the number and weight of the bells and the tower in which they are housed. They may be found in towers that are free-standing or connected to a building. The bells of a carillon may be directly exposed to the elements or hidden inside the structure of their towers.

The origins of the carillon can be traced to the Low Countries—present-day Belgium, the Netherlands, and the French Netherlands—in the 16th century. The modern carillon was invented in 1644 when Jacob van Eyck and the Hemony brothers cast the first tuned carillon. The instrument experienced a peak until the late 18th century, a decline during the French Revolution, a revival in the late 19th century, a second decline during the First and Second World Wars, and a second revival thereafter. UNESCO has designated 56 belfries in Belgium and France as a World Heritage Site and recognized the carillon culture of Belgium as an intangible cultural heritage.

According to counts by various registries, about 700 carillons exist worldwide. Most are in and around the Low Countries, though nearly 200 have been constructed in North America. Almost all extant carillons were constructed in the 20th century. Additionally, about 500 "non-traditional" carillons are known that most registries do not consider to be carillons due to some component of their action being electrified or computerized. A plurality of them is located in the United States, and most of the others are in Western Europe. A few "traveling" or "mobile" carillons are fixed to a frame that enables them to be transported.

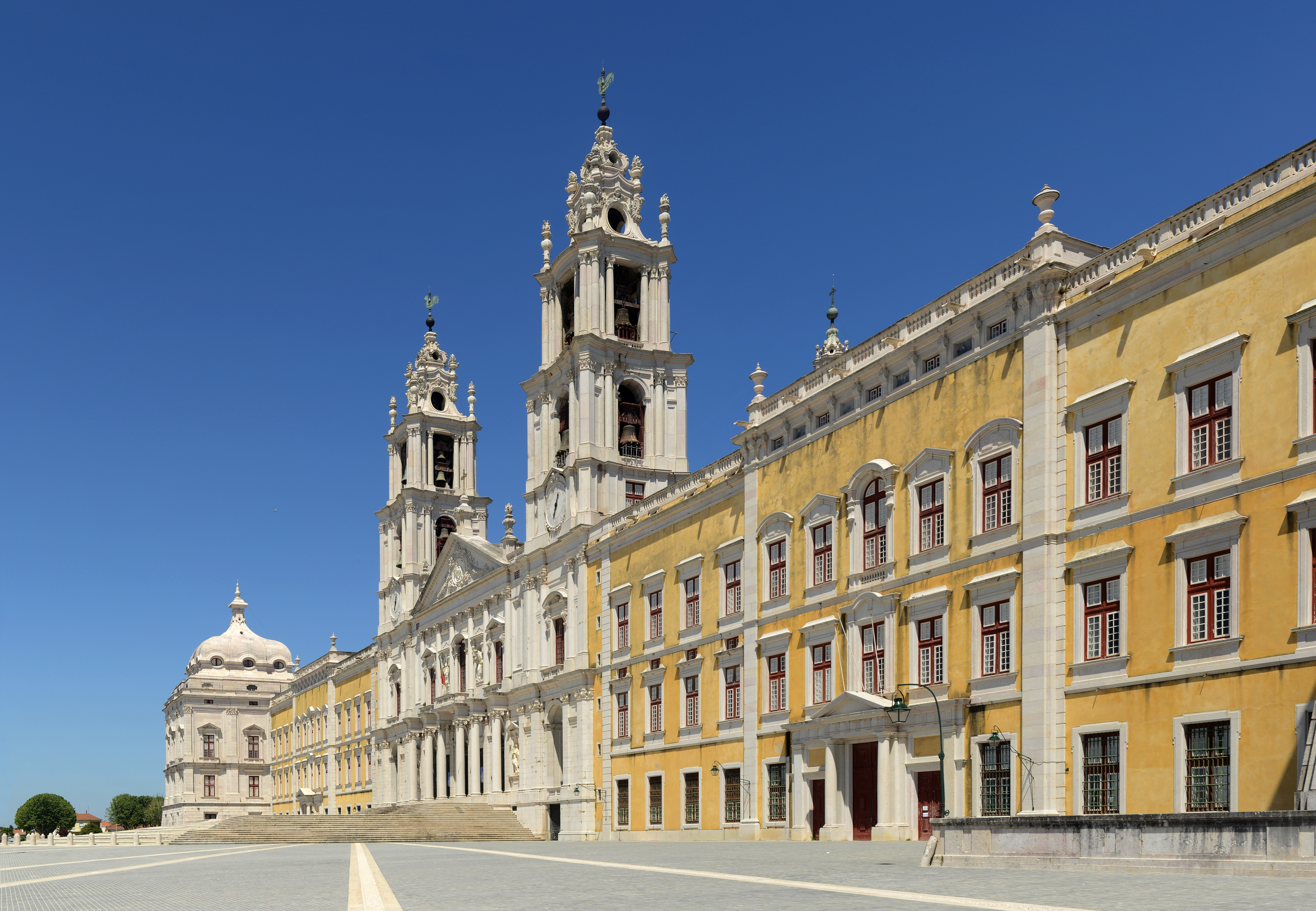
Mafra carillons at the Palace of Mafra, Portugal, the world's largest carillon ensemble

The title of "world's largest carillon by number of bells" is shared between two instruments: the carillon of the Kirk in the Hills Presbyterian Church in Bloomfield Hills, Michigan, US, and the carillon at the Daejeon Institute of Science and Technology in Daejeon, South Korea; both have 77 bells. The largest carillon ensemble in the world is the Mafra carillons, located at the Palace of Mafra, Portugal, comprising a total of 120 bells across its two towers, each approximately 68 metres (223 ft) high, and forming part of a UNESCO World Heritage Site.

=== Chimes ===
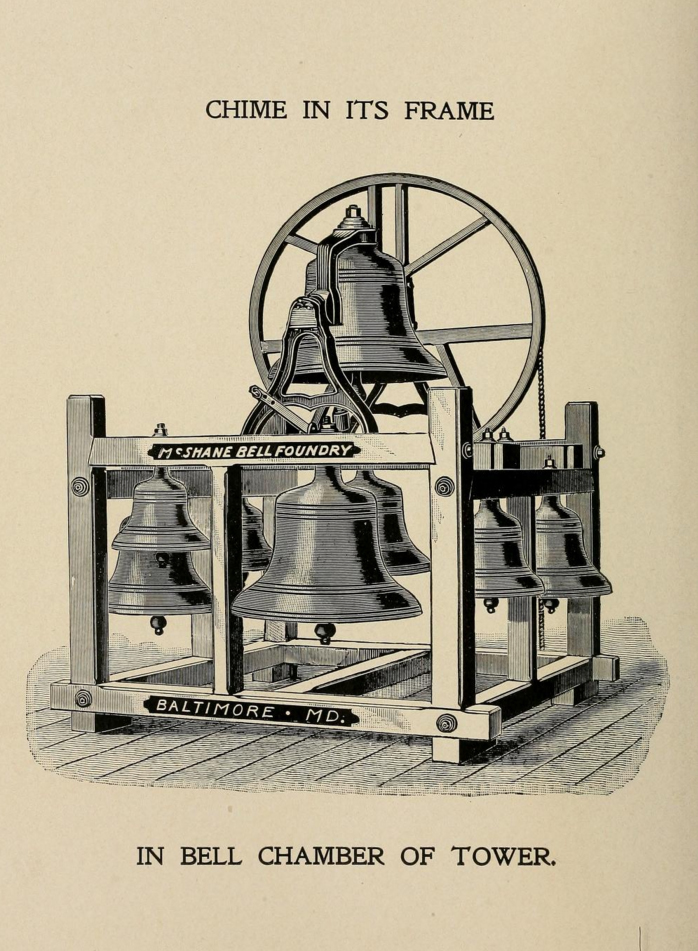
Eight-bell chime in its frame (McShane Bell Foundry, Maryland). Note that the bottom bells are static-chimes, and the top bell is also hung for swing-chiming on its own.

A chime (/ˈtʃaɪm/) or chime of bells is a carillon-like instrument, i.e. a pitched percussion instrument consisting of 22 or fewer bells. A Chime is primarily played with a keyboard, but can also be played with an Ellacombe apparatus. A Chime is often automated, in the past with mechanical drums connected to clocks and in the present with electronic action. Bellfounders often did not attempt to tune chime bells to the same precision as carillon bells. A chime of bells is defined as specifically having fewer than 23 bells to distinguish them from the carillon. American chimes usually have one to one and a half diatonic octaves. According to a recent count, there are over 1,300 existing chimes throughout the world. Almost all are in the Netherlands and the United States, with most of the remainder in Western European countries.

=== Ellacombe apparatus ===
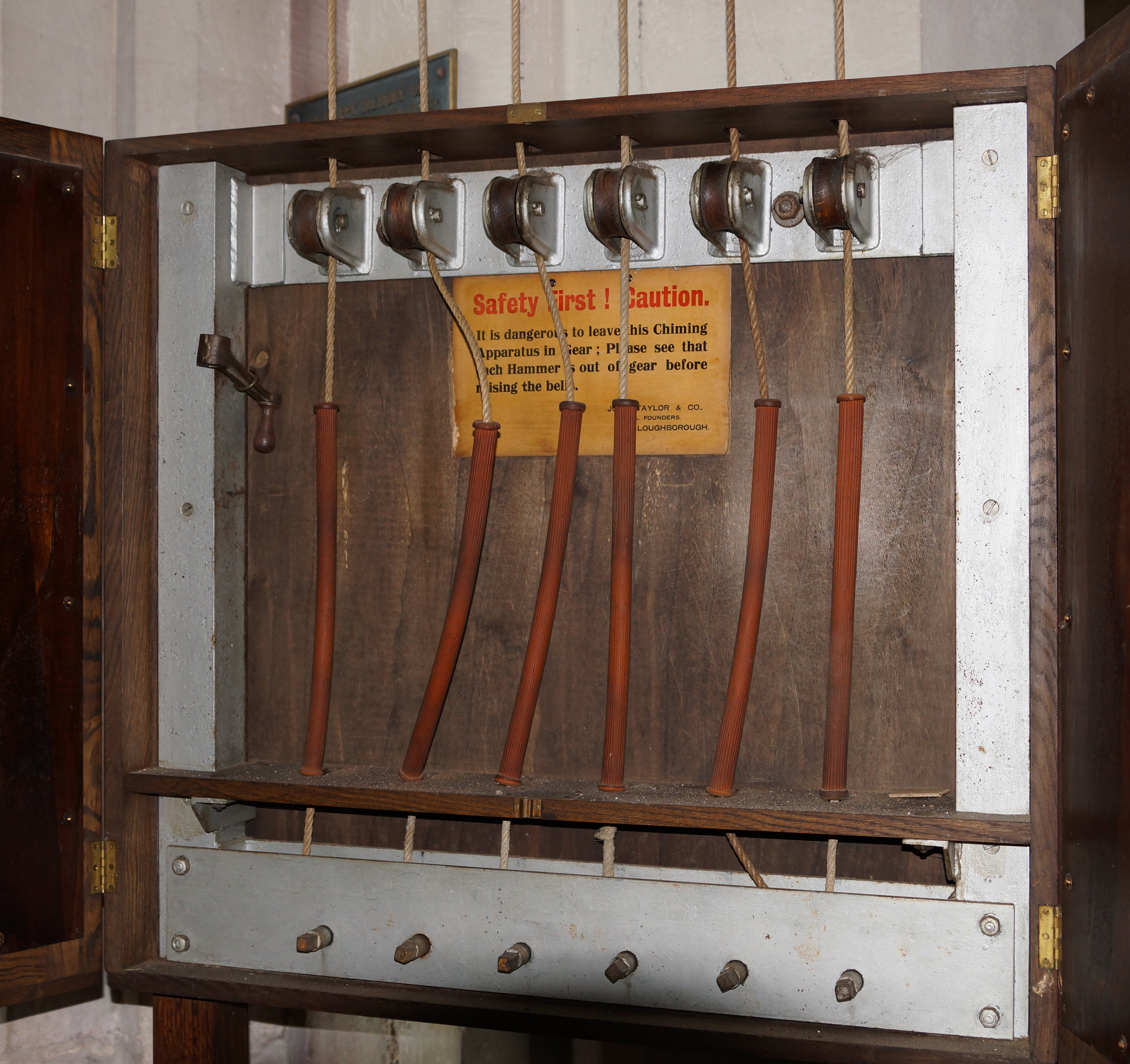
Ellacombe apparatus for six bells

The Ellacombe apparatus is an English mechanism devised for chiming by striking stationary bells with external hammers. However it does not have the same sound as full circle ringing due to the absence of the doppler effect derived from bell rotation and the lack of a damping effect of the clapper after each strike.

It requires only one person to operate. Each hammer is connected by a rope to a fixed frame in the bell-ringing room. When in use the ropes are taut, and pulling one of the ropes towards the player will strike the hammer against the bell. To enable normal full circle ringing on the same bells, the ropes are slackened to allow the hammers to drop away from the moving bells.

The system was devised in 1821 by Reverend Henry Thomas Ellacombe of Gloucestershire, who first had such a system installed in Bitton in 1822. He created the system to make conventional bell-ringers redundant, so churches did not have to tolerate the behaviour of what he thought were unruly bell-ringers.

However, in reality, it required very rare expertise for one person to ring changes. The sound of a chime was a poor substitute for the rich sound of swinging bells, and the apparatus fell out of fashion. Consequently, the Ellacombe apparatus has been disconnected or removed from many towers in the UK. In towers where the apparatus remains intact, it is generally used like a carillon, but to play simple tunes, or if expertise exists, to play changes.

== Bellfounding ==
Bellfounding is the casting and tuning of large bronze bells in a foundry for use such as in churches, clock towers and public buildings, either to signify the time or an event, or as a musical carillon or chime. Large bells are made by casting bell metal in moulds designed for their intended musical pitches. Further fine tuning is then performed using a lathe to shave metal from the bell to produce a distinctive bell tone by sounding the correct musical harmonics.

Bellfounding in East Asia dates from about 2000 BCE and in Europe from the 4th or 5th century CE. In Britain, archaeological excavations have revealed traces of furnaces, showing that bells were often cast on site in pits in a church or its grounds. Centralised foundries became common when railways allowed easy transportation of bells, leading to the dominance of founders such as the Whitechapel Bell Foundry and John Taylor & Co of Loughborough.

Elsewhere in the world a number of foundries are still active, some using traditional methods, and some using the latest foundry techniques. Modern foundries produce harmonically tuned bells using principles established in the late 19th century; some of these are also highly decorative.

== Bell tuning ==
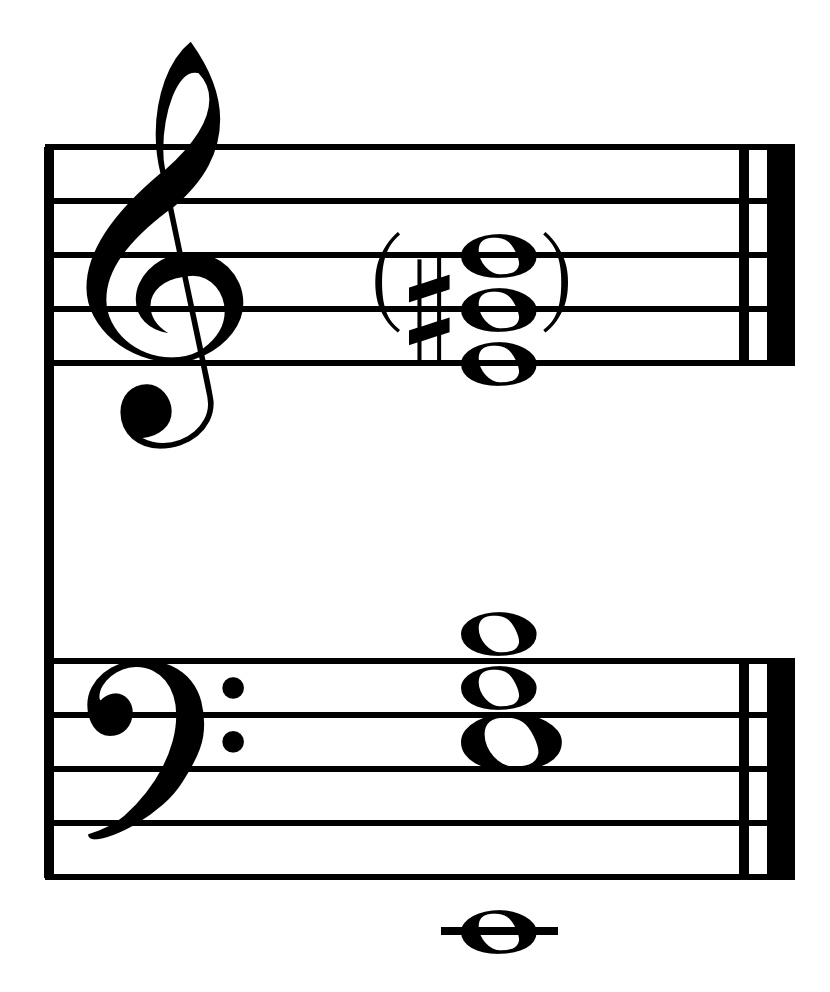
The harmonics produced by Erfurt bell (1497) or any well-tuned bell: strike note on E with hum note, minor third, fifth, octave or nominal, and major third and perfect fifth in the second octave.

The tuning of a bell is dependent on its shape. When first cast it is approximately correct, but it is then machined on a tuning lathe to remove metal until it is in tune. This is a complex exercise, the understanding of which developed over centuries of empirical practice and through later advancements in modern acoustic science.

If a bell is part of a set to be rung or played together, then the initial dominant perceived sound, called the strike note, must be tuned to a designated note of a common scale. In addition each bell will emit harmonics, or partials, which must also be tuned so that these are not discordant with the bell's strike note. This is what Fuller-Maitland writing in Grove's dictionary of music and musicians meant when he said : "Good tone means that a bell must be in tune with itself."

The principal partials are;

- hum note: an octave below the strike note,
- strike note
- tierce: minor third above the strike note
- quint: perfect fifth above the strike note
- nominal: octave above the strike note

Further, less dominant, partials include the major, third and perfect fifth in the octave above these.

"Whether a founder tunes the nominal or the strike note makes little difference, however, because the nominal is one of the main partials that determines the tuning of the strike note." A heavy clapper brings out lower partials (clappers often being about 3% of a bell's mass), while a higher clapper velocity strengthens higher partials (0.4 m/s being moderate). The relative depth of the "bowl" or "cup" part of the bell also determines the number and strength of the partials in order to achieve a desired timbre.

Bells are generally around 80% copper and 20% tin (bell metal), with the tone varying according to material.

Tone and pitch is also affected by the method in which a bell is struck. Asian large bells are often bowl shaped but lack the lip and are often not free-swinging. Also note the special shape of Bianzhong bells, allowing two tones. The scaling or size of most bells to each other may be approximated by the equation for circular cylinders:

f=Ch/D^{2}

where h is thickness, D is diameter, and C is a constant determined by the material and the profile.

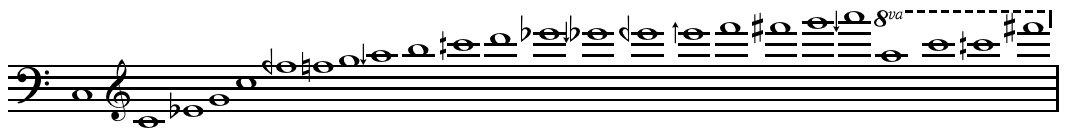
Spectrum of a Winchester Cathedral bell as analyzed by Jonathan Harvey using FFT. "The bell produces a secondary pitch (f') which lies outside that 'inharmonic series though it is clearly audible when the bell is struck, 'to curiously thrilling and disturbing effect.'" The strike tone is middle C, the hum tone an octave below.

=== The major third bell ===
On the theory that pieces in major keys may better be accommodated, after many unsatisfactory attempts, in the 1980s, using computer modeling for assistance in design by scientists at the Technical University in Eindhoven, bells with a major-third profile were created by the Royal Eijsbouts bell foundry in the Netherlands, being described as resembling old Coke bottles in that they have a bulge around the middle; and in 1999 a design without the bulge was announced.

== Bell organizations ==
The following organizations promote the study, music, collection and/or preservation and restoration of bells. Nation(s) covered are given in parentheses.

- The American Bell Association International (United States with foreign chapters)
- Association Campanaire Wallonne asbl (Belgium)
- Associazione Italiana di Campanologia (Italy)
- Associazione Suonatori di Campane a Sistema Veronese (Italy)
- The Australian and New Zealand Association of Bellringers (Australia, New Zealand)
- Beratungsausschuss für das Deutsche Glockenwesen (Germany)
- British Carillon Society (United Kingdom)
- The Central Council of Church Bell Ringers (UK)
- Gruppo Campanari Padre Stanislao Mattei (Bologna, Italy)
- Handbell Musicians of America (United States, chapter of English Handbell Ringers Association)
- Handbell Ringers of Great Britain (United Kingdom)
- Société Française de Campanologie (France)
- Unione Campanari Bolognesi (Emilia and Romagna, Italy)
- Unione Campanari Modenesi "Alberto Corni" (Modena, Italy)
- Verband Deutscher Glockengießereien e.V. (Germany)
- World Carillon Federation (multinational)

== Famous campanologists ==
- Fabian Stedman (1640–1713), had a key role in publishing two books Tintinnalogia (1668 with Richard Duckworth) and Campanalogia (1677 – written solely by him) which are the first two publications on the subject
- William Brereton, 2nd Baron Brereton, 1st master of the Ancient Society of College Youths
- Arthur Heywood, founder of the Central Council of Church Bell Ringers
- Bilbie family, were bell founders and clockmaker
- Ronald Hammerton Dove, wrote Dove's Guide for Church Bell Ringers
- William Gillett, founded Gillett & Johnston

== See also ==
- Index of campanology articles
- The vanished bells project

== General and cited references ==
- "Campanology". Oxford English Dictionary (online ed.). Oxford University Press. (Subscription or participating institution membership required.)
- "Carillon". Oxford English Dictionary (online ed.). Oxford University Press. (Subscription or participating institution membership required.)
- Dove's Guide for Church Bell Ringers to the Ringing Bells of Britain and of the World (2000).
- Duckworth, Richard and Stedman, Fabian (1970) [1668]. Tintinnalogia; or, The Art of Ringing, 1st ed. reprinted. Bath: Kingsmead Reprints. ISBN 0-901571-41-5.
- Ingram, Tom (1954). Bells of England. London: F. Muller.
- Slater, James B. (2003). "A Register of Honorary Members, 1936–1996" (PDF). The Bulletin. 52 (1). The Guild of Carillonneurs in North America. OCLC 998832003. Archived from the original on 10 February 2021.
- Stedman, F. (1990) [1677]. Campanalogia: or The Art of Ringing Improved ..., facsimile of 1st ed. Kettering: C. Groome. ISBN 1-85580-001-2.
- Walters, H. B. (1908). Church Bells. London: Mowbray.
- Wilson, Wilfrid G. (1965). Change Ringing: The Art and Science of Change Ringing on Church and Hand Bells. London: Faber.
