= Albert J. Pitman =

Albert John Pitman is regarded by change ringing campanologists as a remarkable and versatile composer of peals in bell ringing methods. Described as 'perhaps the greatest of all time' in the Central Council of Church Bell Ringers biography of him, An Unassuming Genius, he was an extraordinary talent in the field of peal composition.

== Life ==
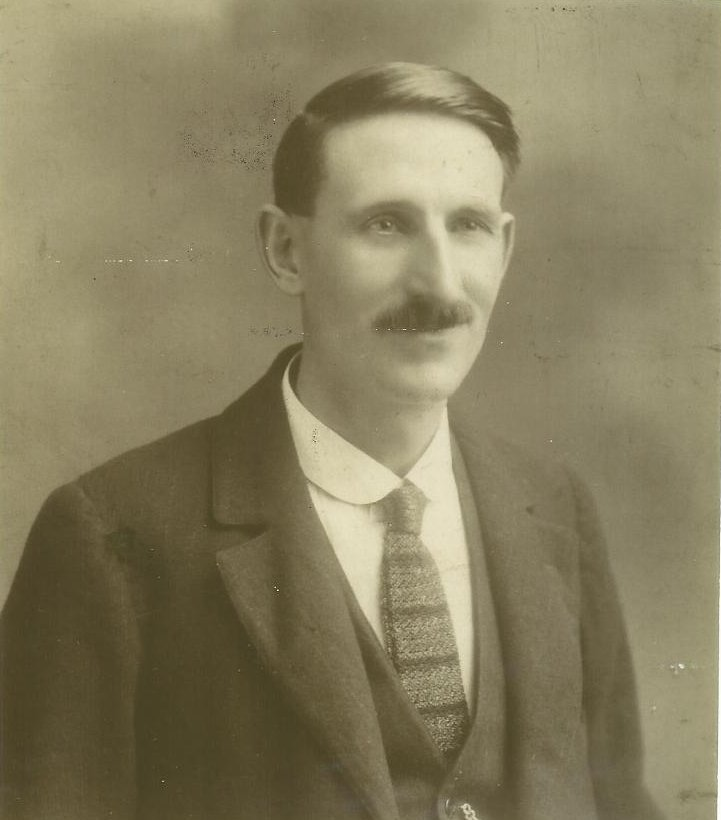
Albert J Pitman, in his thirties.

Born in Bridgend, Glamorgan in 1887, two years later he moved with his family some twenty miles west, to Baglan, Neath Port Talbot. He had very little education, leaving school at the age of twelve, but his teacher told him ‘there’s nothing more I can teach you.’ This was perhaps an early sign of an unusual talent. In 1903 at the age of sixteen he joined the Great Western Railway Company and worked for them until his compulsory retirement at sixty-five.

He learned to ring bells the year he left school, probably from his father, who was a member of the bell-ringing band at St Catharine's Church, Baglan. Only eleven years later, in 1910, he rang and conducted his own peal, of 5040 Grandsire Triples at St Mary’s Church, Aberavon, 'a highly unusual step for a ‘first-timer.’

Later, his daughter Dolly, who, with her siblings, inherited his mathematical genius, was paid a silver threepenny piece to check his compositions for ‘falseness' (repetition of any of the rows of figures in the peal). None was found to be so then, nor since.

Many of his compositions appeared to have been inspired by challenges thrown down by editorials, letters and articles in The Ringing World. The first peal containing more than one Triples method was composed and conducted by him in 1925. Four years later he composed and conducted the first peal of Forward Major, and one of his peals was rung during the celebrations of the Silver Wedding anniversary of King George VI and Queen Elizabeth.

He continued to compose throughout the 1940s; a decade capped by him being accorded the unusual privilege of writing the leading article in The Ringing World. However, it was during the 1950s that he produced what many regard as his masterpieces; a ground-breaking peal of 5280 Spliced Surprise Major, followed by a composition of 5472 or 5408 changes – in The Ringing World it was described as a ‘week of ringing history’.

His major achievement in 1961 was the publication of two compositions, numbers 1 and 2 of 13440 Spliced Surprise Major in six methods, yet another challenge for serious bell-ringers. Less well known, but nonetheless important, are his compositions of ‘Sunday Service’ touches; shorter pieces rung prior to church services, which he continued to produce right up to the year of his death. Throughout his life Pitman was convinced that a major feature of composition was to produce the best music, and his compositions have often been regarded as amongst the most musical. Indeed, the issue of the musical nature of bell ringing was raised by a leader in The Times on 1 February 1927

Pitman died on 16 August 1966 and was buried at St Catharine’s Church, Baglan, in the grave of his late wife, Evelyn, who had died in 1953, and close to the grave of his parents. Bell-ringers mark the death of a colleague by ringing a peal or quarter peal, often rung ‘muffled’ the first being rung on the day of his funeral at St Catharine’s. On the day, and in the following weeks, memorial peals were rung in Cheshire, Yorkshire, Surrey, Monmouthshire and Westminster.

== Legacy ==
A current copy of The Ringing World is unlikely not to contain a reference to him. S4C, the Welsh-language television channel (the equivalent of Channel 4), broadcast a piece on him in their Christmas Eve 1984 documentary on bell-ringing in Wales, Cân y Clychau.

The Central Council of Church Bell Ringers estimate the number of his published compositions to be ‘over a hundred’ with many more unpublished, some of which he sent directly to conductors he felt could ‘do justice’ to the piece. His name lives on in Wales through a competition for the Pitman Trophy. His compositions are regularly rung throughout the now-global bell-ringing world. A search on Bellboard shows compositions of his rung over 600 times in the UK alone since 2000.

To mark the 50th anniversary of his death, members of the Llandaff and Monmouth DACBR rang his composition of Grandsire Doubles, as was rung on the same bells at St Catharine's Church, Baglan, immediately after his funeral. Prior to the peal, prayers were said at the graveside, followed by a ringing of hand-bells. This was all in the company of many of his grandchildren, great grandchildren and great-great grandchildren.

On Thursday 20 September 2023 a brief but significant ceremony took place at St Mary’s Church in Aberavon, South Wales. The event was arranged to dedicate and install two peal boards, recording peals rung over 25 years ago. The proceedings began with a welcome from Andrew John, a former Master of the Llandaff and Monmouth DACBR and organiser of the peals in question, who welcomed to the church no less than five members of the Pitman family; four grandchildren, one spouse and one great granddaughter, two of whom had travelled some distance to be present. Andrew also welcomed some of the people who rang in the said peals, and other local ringers. He explained that in 1995 he was inspired to suggest that the then resident members of the Association should ring A J Pitman’s "all the work" compositions of Spliced Surprise Major in four to nine methods. These compositions were the epitome of his lifetime’s work as a composer, and this would ensure that they had been rung in the composer’s home tower.

Following Andrew’s welcome and introduction the boards were dedicated by the Fr Miles Pateman, Priest-in-Charge, himself a ringer, who led the group in appropriate prayers. A short musical touch of Stedman Triples was rung, and after photographs were taken the party adjourned for refreshments in the church.

== See also ==
- Fabian Stedman
- John Holt (composer)
