= Ron Johnston (geographer) =

British geographer (1941–2020)

Ron Johnston OBE FAcSS FBA
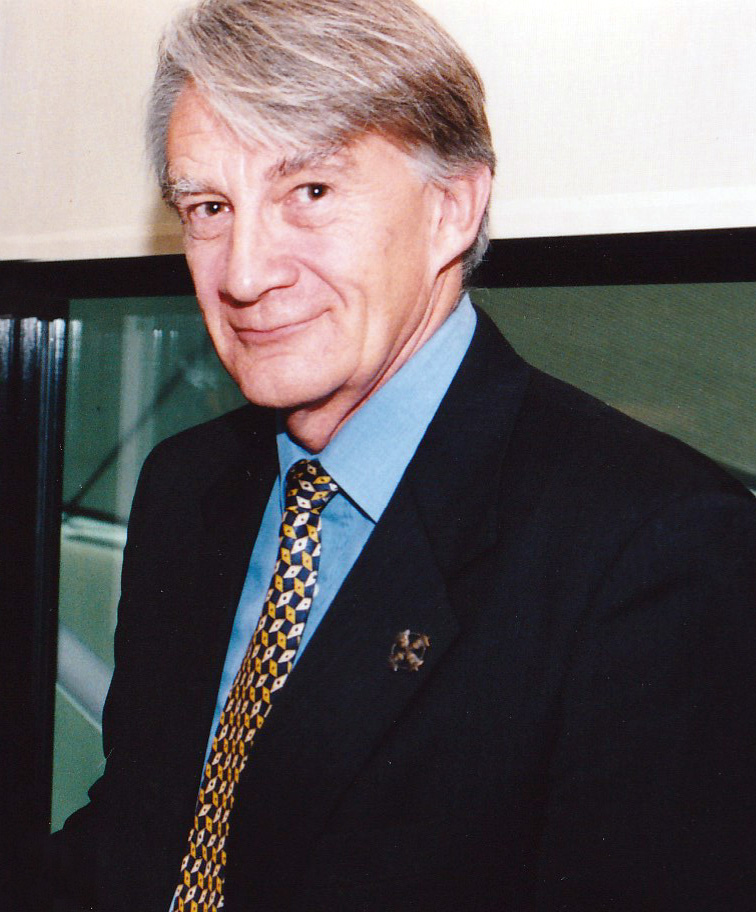
- Portrait of Johnston at the Festival international de géographie in Saint-Dié, 1999
- Born: Ronald John Johnston; 30 March 1941; Wiltshire, United Kingdom
- Died: 29 May 2020 (aged 79)

Academic background
- Education: Monash University

Academic work
- Era: Long twentieth century
- Discipline: Geography

Ronald John Johnston, OBE, FAcSS, FBA (30 March 1941, Wiltshire, United Kingdom – 29 May 2020) was a British geographer, known for elaborating his discipline's foundations, particularly its history and nature, and for his contributions to urban social geography and electoral geography. His broad scope is illustrated by the fact that he made extensive use of quantitative methods, while critically dealing with subjects of social and political relevance. Johnston authored or co-authored more than 50 books and 800 papers, and edited or co-edited a further more than 40 books (if translated and revised editions are counted separately). He edited The Dictionary of Human Geography and for the first four editions was its main editor.

== Academic career ==
After receiving his bachelor's and master's degrees from the University of Manchester in 1962 and 1964, respectively, he moved to Monash University in Melbourne, Australia. There, Johnston obtained a PhD degree, and came in contact with what has become known as the quantitative revolution of geography. He also wrote his first paper on urban social geography during that time. From 1967–1974, he was part of the academic staff at the University of Canterbury in Christchurch, New Zealand, where his interest in electoral geography began to develop. Johnston then was appointed professor at the University of Sheffield. In 1979, Geography and Geographers, which he updated and expanded every few years, and whose various editions have been translated into four languages, was published. Johnston became co-editor of the two journals Progress in Human Geography and Environment and Planning A that same year. In 1981, the first edition of The Dictionary of Human Geography, to which Johnston contributed hundreds of articles, was published. It has maintained its status as the discipline's authoritative dictionary ever since. After serving as pro-vice-chancellor for academic affairs of the University of Sheffield, he became vice-chancellor of the University of Essex in 1992. From 1995, Johnston was a professor at the University of Bristol. He retired from the editorial boards of both Progress in Human Geography and Environment and Planning A in 2006.

== Recognition ==
Johnston was one of the most cited geographers for decades. (Note: In an analysis of citation records based on the SSCI and the SCI, he was identified as the second most cited geographer for 1981–1985, and the third most cited one for 1986–1990 (Bodman, A. (1992): Holes in the Fabric. More on the Master Weavers in Human Geography. Transactions of the Institute of British Geographers 17 (1): 108–109). In another citation count that covered more than 20 years (1981 – October 2002), this time based on the SSCI and the A&HCI, Johnston was listed as one of twelve geographers who had been cited more than 1000 times (Yeung, H. W. (2002): Deciphering citations. Environment and Planning A 34 (12): 2093–2102).) Among the most prestigious awards Johnston received were the Murchison Award (1985) and the Victoria Medal (1990) by the Royal Geographical Society, the Prix Vautrin Lud at the International Geography Festival 1999, and a lifetime achievement award from the Association of American Geographers (2009). Furthermore, he held honorary doctorates from the University of Essex (D.Univ. 1996), Monash University (LL.D. 1999), the University of Sheffield (Litt.D. 2002) and the University of Bath (Litt.D. 2005). He was elected a founding Academician (later renamed fellow) of the Academy of Social Sciences (FAcSS) in 1999, and was elected an ordinary fellow of the British Academy in 1999. Johnston was appointed Officer of the Order of the British Empire (OBE) in the 2011 Birthday Honours for services to scholarship.

== Campanology ==
Johnston was an active bell-ringer. He published two books on aspects of campanology, "Change-Ringing: the English Art of Bell-Ringing" and "An Atlas of Bells", and was co-compiler of three editions of "Dove’s Guide to the Church Bells of Britain". Johnston served as ringing master of the Sheffield Cathedral Company of Ringers from 1980 to 1992, as president of the Yorkshire Association of Change Ringers from 1990 to 1992, and as president of the Central Council of Church Bell Ringers from 1993 to 1996.

== Selected publications ==
=== Monographs ===
- Johnston, R. J. (1971): Urban Residential Patterns: An Introductory Review. London (G . Bell & Sons). ISBN 0-7135-1675-5
- Johnston, R. J. (1978): Multivariate Statistical Analysis in Geography: A Primer on the General Linear Model. London (Longman). ISBN 0-582-48677-7
- Taylor, P. J. and R. J. Johnston (1979): Geography of Elections. Harmondsworth (Penguin). ISBN 0-7099-0056-2
- Johnston, R. J. (1979): Geography and Geographers: Anglo-American Human Geography since 1945. London (Edward Arnold). ISBN 0-7131-6239-2 (7th edition announced for publication in 2010)
- Johnston, R. J. (1991): A Question of Place: Exploring the Practice of Human Geography. Blackwell (Oxford). ISBN 0-631-15603-8

=== Edited Collections ===
- Johnston, R .J. et al. (eds.) (1981): The Dictionary of Human Geography. Oxford (Blackwell). ISBN 0-631-10721-5 (5th edition published in 2009)
- Johnston, R. J., P. J. Taylor and Michael Watts (eds.) (1995): Geographies of Global Change: Remapping the World in the Late Twentieth Century. London (Blackwell). ISBN 0-631-19327-8

== Notes ==
Academic offices
Preceded by Sir Martin Harris	Vice-Chancellor of the University of Essex; 1992–1995	Succeeded by Sir Ivor Crewe
