= John Holt (composer) =

John Holt was a leading change ringer and noted composer of peals on English full circle bells in the 18th century, and is described as a composer "..holding a position which is unique in the history of change ringing".

One John Holt who was baptized at Christ Church Greyfriars on 31 March 1726 is suggested to have been him, although someone of the same name was also baptized in October of the same year at St Botolph's Aldgate, East Smithfield. He died in 1753, at the age of twenty-seven.

Holt was not born into wealth, being described years later in the 1788 Clavis Campanalogia (a bellringing textbook) as "a poor unlettered youth", which could well account for his untimely death. By trade he was a shoemaker, but very little else is known about his personal life.

== Ringing career ==
In some respects, however, his ringing career remains almost as mysterious as his personal life. It is not known at which tower Holt learnt to ring, or who taught him. Most information about him is drawn solely from the records of the London ringing societies with which he was affiliated. Holt became a member of the Union Scholars bell ringing society in 1745. He took on a prominent role as conductor, conducting most of the society's peals before it became defunct. In 1752 he left the Union Scholars and became a member of the Ancient Society of College Youths, to this day a thriving company.

== Compositions ==
It was possibly Holt's role as a conductor that got him interested in composing peals. As with his general ringing career, it is not known how he learnt the aspects of the art. Some of his compositions were recorded in the peal book of the Union Scholars. His chosen composition style in methods such as Grandsire Caters and Plain Bob Major is very similar to the compositions in these methods produced by his peers. In 1753 a broadsheet of four of Holt's Triples compositions was advertised for a subscription of five shillings and three pence. The document did not become available until the following year, after the composer's death, the delay possibly being a result of the objections made by Benjamin Annable, a leading London ringer.

It is his peal compositions of Grandsire Triples that are among the most famous in the art of ringing, and are still rung frequently today. Composing a peal of Grandsire Triples is acknowledged as a complex theoretical task, undertaken by specialist composers. Such was Holt's genius, that his compositions of Grandsire Triples were completely unprecedented at the time of their publication. Virtually all composition achievements in the history of ringing have resulted from an evolutionary progression, where composers of one generation work on the foundations laid by their predecessors. Not only were Holt's Grandsire Triples peals groundbreaking, original, and uninfluenced from earlier composers' work, they also remained virtually unparalleled for over a hundred years; it was only in the second half of the 19th century that other composers began to discover the secrets of the mathematics of Grandsire Triples composition which had been known only by Holt prior to then. His two best known and most commonly rung Grandsire Triples compositions are Holt's Ten-Part and Holt's Original.

== Holt's Original ==
Holt's Original is a one-part B-Block peal composition of Grandsire Triples composed by John Holt in 1751. It was the first true peal composition of Grandsire Triples to not function on the three lead course plan and to use only two singles. The composition contains 150 calls in total. The two singles occur as near the end of the composition as is possible, the first single being at the 357th lead, the second at the 360th (final) lead. Holt's Original was first rung at St Margaret's, Westminster, on 7 July 1751. Being of a one-part structure, the composition is a challenge to learn and conduct and has become the most popular memory challenge for conductors. Indeed, Holt himself conducted the peal from a manuscript whilst sitting in the ringing chamber when the composition was rung for the first time. William Dixon was the first person to conduct the composition whilst himself participating in the performance, a feat he achieved at St Michael Coslany, Norwich, on 22 August 1752. He successfully conducted the composition again two months later at St Giles' Church, Norwich. A number of other one-part peal compositions of Grandsire Triples have been composed since Holt's Original, most notably Parker's One-Part which contains 90 calls, the minimum possible number.

== Holt's Ten-Part ==
Holt's Ten-Part is a P-Block peal composition of Grandsire Triples composed by John Holt sometime between 1751 and his death in 1753. The composition is still considered to be one of the most intriguing in change ringing. It contains 100 calls. Although described and conducted as a ten-part, the composition is theoretically a palindromic five-part which is split into ten sections. Five sections (the five first halves of each full palindromic part) form the first half of the composition, followed by the remaining five sections (the five second halves of each full palindromic part) which form the second half. The two halves of the peal composition are joined by two Holt's Bob Singles; the first halfway through the composition, and the second one at the end. To have the composition functioning as a 'perfect' palindrome five-part (where a total of ten Holt's Bob Singles would be required) is not possible, as the composition would finish after just one part.

It is not clear when or where Holt's Ten-Part was rung for the first time. On 12 October 1754 the composition was rung at St. Leonard's, Shoreditch, and was claimed to be the first time of its performance. However, there had been two peals of Grandsire Triples earlier that year conducted by William Underwood which were described as having 'two singles', although there is the possibility that they could have been Holt's Original, or Holt's six-part composition.

What certainly is clear is that Holt's Ten-Part became the most important composition of Grandsire Triples for well over a century. It provided more interest than the earlier peals on the three lead course plan, and it was an easy composition to learn and fairly easy to conduct. Parker's Twelve-Part, published in the later years of the nineteenth century, took over as the 'easiest' Grandsire Triples composition for conductors, and remains so to the present day.

Other peal compositions of Grandsire Triples on a palindromic plan are fairly rare. Holt's six-part composition, published in the 1753 broadsheet, is on this plan but never became as popular as the ten-part as it was less easy to learn. in the 1880s Rev'd C D P Davies produced a palindrome ten-part similar to Holt's, with 150 calls. At the beginning of the 20th century, A J Corrigan published a palindrome six-part composition using ordinary Grandsire Singles.

== See also ==
- Fabian Stedman
- Albert J Pitman
