= Yarkhill =

Coordinates: 52.081°N 2.573°W

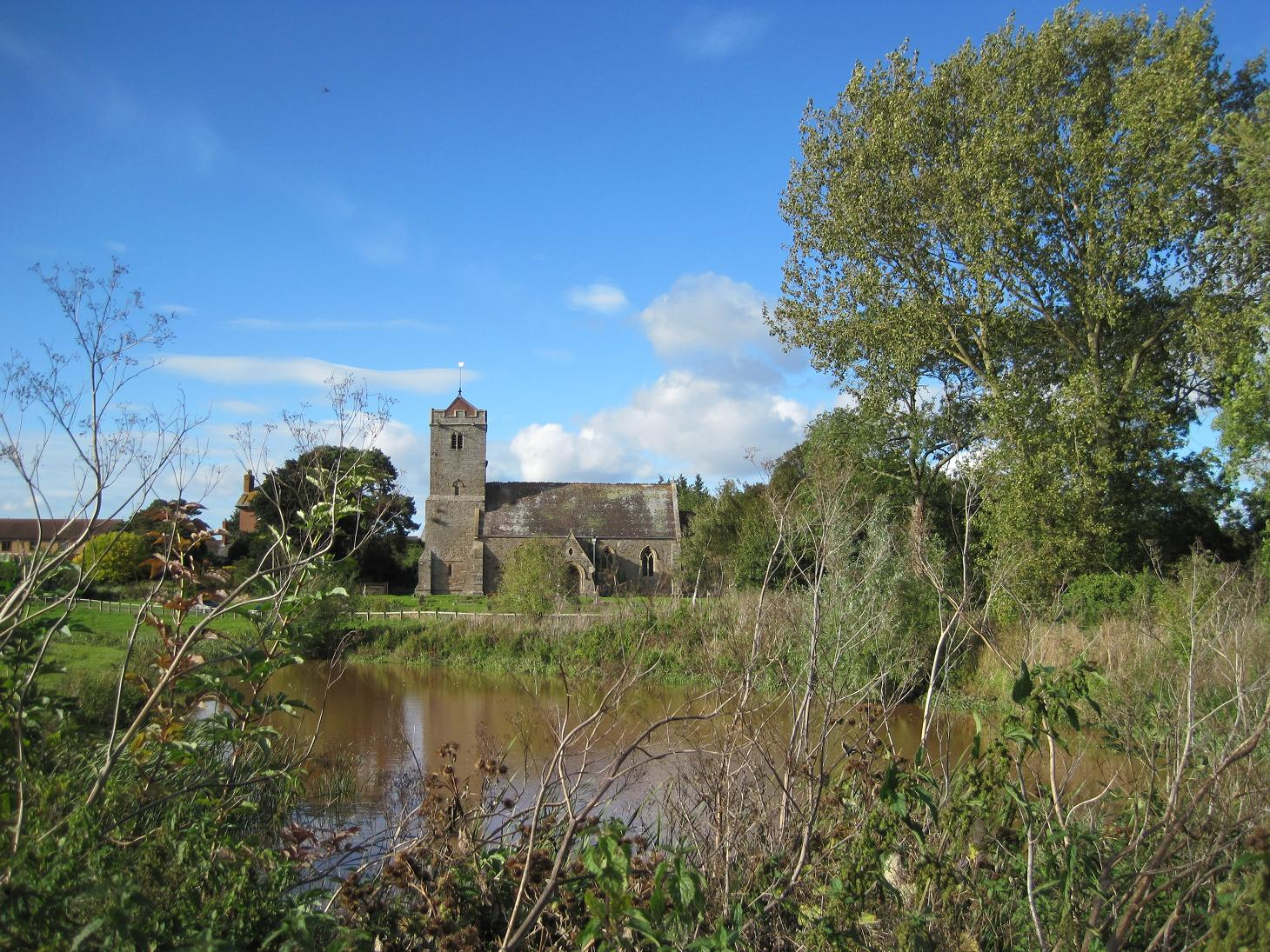
- Church of St John the Baptist

- Location within Herefordshire
- Population: 326 (2011)
- Shire county: Herefordshire
- Region: West Midlands
- Country: England
- Sovereign state: United Kingdom
- Post town: Hereford
- Postcode district: HR1
- Dialling code: 01432
- Police: West Mercia
- Fire: Hereford and Worcester
- Ambulance: West Midlands
- UK Parliament: North Herefordshire

Yarkhill is a village in Herefordshire, England located about 9 miles (14 km) from both Hereford and Ledbury.

The village is Anglo-Saxon in origin and is a much dispersed parish, with no definable nucleus, of approximately 145 homes spread over some 8 square miles (21 km^{2}), comprising about 300 people. It borders the villages of Ashperton, Stoke Edith, Stretton Grandison, Tarrington and Weston Beggard. Yarkhill lies in the valley of the River Frome; in 811 the name of this settlement was Geardcylle, meaning enclosure with a kiln. In 1066 it was held by a Knight of King Harold called Arkell and the present name of Yarkhill may have derived from that or from the Saxon word Yarcle meaning slope of the hill. The sister churches of Tarrington and Stoke Edith can be seen on the other side of the valley. Yarkhill was mentioned in the Domesday Book of 1086 and has been a farming community around the River Frome since that time. Yarkhill once had a school but that has been converted into a village hall.

Yarkhill Church is the oldest intact building in the village. Close to the river but high enough to be safe from flooding, it dates from circa 1200 with many extensions, alterations and repairs. St John the Baptist Church is a grade two-listed building. The church is typical in design with a nave, chancel, vestry, and western tower and seats about 120 people at full capacity. In the churchyard there is an ancient and very large yew tree and a war memorial.

Yarkhill Church is important to campanologists as the "Father of Change Ringing" Fabian Stedman was born in the village and baptised at St John's church on 7 December 1640. Fabian's father Francis Stedman was Rector of Yarkhill from 1625 to 1671. Francis's time as Rector saw the installation of the current ring of four bells seen today. In October 2012 the Church finally completed the project to install 8 new bells dedicated to the legacy of Fabian Stedman. In fact the new tenor bell of the ring of eight was inscribed "Given by the Bell Restoration Fund who named me Fabian Stedman 1640-1713". The old four bells have been preserved as they hang in the old 17th-century bell frame. It is still hoped when funds become available that the old bells will be fitted with chiming apperatur so they can be heard. The new bells have been rung regularly on practice nights and for Sunday service. Many visitors have been given permission to ring the bells for pure enjoyment, and Stedman Triples is a regular method to be heard ringing out from the tower.

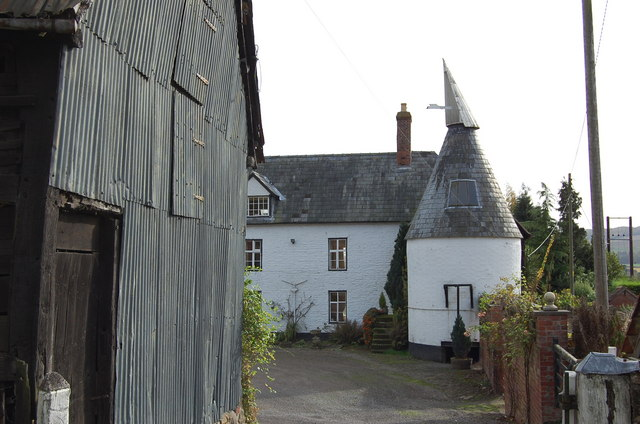
Castle Farm
