= Vanished Bells =

Czech project to record and preserve bell sounds

A 1941 recording of church bells in Křemešník, archived by the project

Vanished Bells (Czech: Zaniklé zvony) is a project of the Czech Radio and Wikimedia Czech Republic focused on recording and digitizing the sounds of historic church bells. The historic bells went silent due to World War II and many were lost. The project has digitally recorded and preserved their sound, providing the Czech public another aspect of their cultural heritage.

== Background ==
The idea behind the project comes from old recordings of the bells made between 1940 and 1941. The recordings were made back then for the Czechoslovak Radio, for a series by the name Zvony mého kraje ('bells of my region'). The recordings were done on sound foils, recording the bell's distinctive sound in both urban and rural areas in the Protectorate of Bohemia and Moravia (occupied Czechoslovakia). During the war and Nazi occupation, local authorities were forced to give up the bells to German forces, who melted the bronze bells to make weapons, like artillery shells. This makes their sound and recordings a rare piece of Czech history that otherwise would be lost.

== Progress ==
The Vanished Bells project was launched in 2025 by sound engineer Miloslav Turek and archivist Jana Bartošová. They found the old recordings and started digitizing them. The project is a cooperation between Czech Radio and Wikimedia Czech Republic, aiming to preserve the bells sound and publicly share it on Wikimedia Commons and related Wikipedia pages. There are now about 90 historic bells recordings for different areas available to the public. This enriches the learning experience about the cultural and historical importance of the bells. The project involved transforming original 1940s sound foils recordings to modern digital format sound.

== Goal and legacy ==
The project aims to preserve and share with the public the sounds of the historic bells. The project will continue to explore archives to find additional recordings, including those from the 1930s Moravian region. This will be achieved by collaborating with campanology experts who will help make the bells a cultural symbol.
