= Fabian Stedman =

English author, mathematician, and bellringer

Fabian Stedman (1640–1713) was an English author and a leading figure in the early history of campanology, particularly in the field of method ringing. He had a key role in publishing two books Tintinnalogia (1668 with Richard Duckworth) and Campanalogia (1677 – written solely by him) which are the first two publications on the subject. He is also regarded as being a pioneer in the branch of mathematics known as Group theory.

== Life ==
Fabian Stedman was born in Yarkhill, Herefordshire, the third son to Reverend Francis Stedman. His father Francis Stedman was born in Aston Munslow, Shropshire in 1598, who took Holy Orders at Yarkhill in 1625. Francis had seven children by two wives. The eldest was Francis Junior who followed his father and became Rector of the parish of Stoke Lacy, Herefordshire in 1660. Fabian Stedman was born in 1640 and baptised at Yarkhill Church on 7 December of that year. At the age of 15 he went to London to learn the trade of master printing, apprenticed to Daniel Pakeman. However it was while in London that he became the well-known bellringer. It was said that he was appointed parish clerk to St Bene't's Church in Cambridge in 1670, and to have instructed the ringers, but no clear evidence for these activities have been found.

While in London, Fabian became a member of the Scholars of Cheapside, a society of ringing that practised at St Mary-le-Bow; the famous great bell of Bow from the nursery rhyme. He acted as their treasurer in 1662. It seems the society disbanded and he then applied to be a member of the Ancient Society of College Youths. The College Youths accepted him in 1664 at the age of 23. He advanced through the society, and in 1667 became steward, and in 1682 he became the Master.

Of his later life, little is known other than it seems it did not involve ringing. He changed jobs and became auditor to Customs and Excise for the Crown. He wrote his will on 17 October 1713 and died later that year. He was buried at the parish church of St Andrew Undershaft in the City of London on 16 November. The exact date of his death is not known.

== Tintinnalogia ==
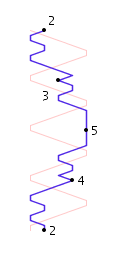
Doubles and Singles on five bells, a method from Duckworth and Stedman's book Tintinnalogia.

Fabian Stedman was the publisher of the first book on change ringing called Tintinnalogia, written by Richard Duckworth, most likely rector of St Martin's, Carfax, Oxford, and later Steeple Aston, Oxfordshire.

The book was published in 1667 and is regarded as the biggest boost to the spread of change ringing in the 17th century. It seemed to have been very popular as a second print run followed just a year later. The book dealt first with "single changes", where only one pair of bells changed at each new row, and then with "cross changes", where more than one pair of bells changed at a time. The first cross changes described are "Doubles and Singles on four bells", meaning one pair and then two pairs of bells changed alternately in each row throughout the method. This is what is known now as Plain Bob Minimus.

He then described nine different cross peals on five bells, including Grandsire which is still widely rung today. There was not much written about changes on six bells, but there is a variation on "Trebles and Doubles" (where alternately two pairs, then three pairs of bells change), which is the modern Plain Bob Minor. The name Grandsire Bob was used for a particular 720 changes of Plain Bob Minor. This was devised around 1650, probably by Robert Roan, who became master of the College Youths in 1652. There is evidence in the book that changes on seven bells were being rung at that time.

== Campanalogia ==
After the publication of Tintinnalogia change ringing developed and spread more rapidly. Within a few years Stedman saw the need for an up to date book, and Campanalogia was written solely by him in 1677. Single change "peals" he called "plain changes". In describing cross-peals he introduced a shorthand notation, which meant the changes were not written out in full, but the rows occurring at the lead-ends (when the treble leads) were given instead.

The major advance was in the publication of many new methods. Stedman devised 53 of his own methods on five, six, seven and eight bells. Among the five-bell methods was "Stedman's Principle", which is widely rung today. The publishing of ringing methods stimulated their use and development further, and in 1684 the College Youths rang three 720s, a total of 2,160 changes without standing their bells, at St Mary Overy.

== Legacy ==
On the first page of Tintinnalogia are the words "by a lover of that art" F. Stedman. Whilst he was a very important player in the development of early change ringing, Stedman is best remembered today for his ringing "principle" (so-called because all the bells follow the same principle of changing) that is as commonly rung as much today as it was in the 17th century. Stedman Doubles to Cinques (5 to 11 bells) is rung in many parish churches in the islands of Britain and Ireland, and other countries which practise the English style of method ringing.

According to the best available knowledge in 2017, 6,929 peals of Grandsire Caters (on 10 bells) were rung in the 300 years after 11 January 1711. Grandsire Caters was the leading 10-bell method in each decade from 1711 to 1890, but Stedman Caters has proved more popular recently and on 9 July 2010 its cumulative peal total from 1711 pulled ahead of the running Grandsire total.

== Primer on early English change ringing ==
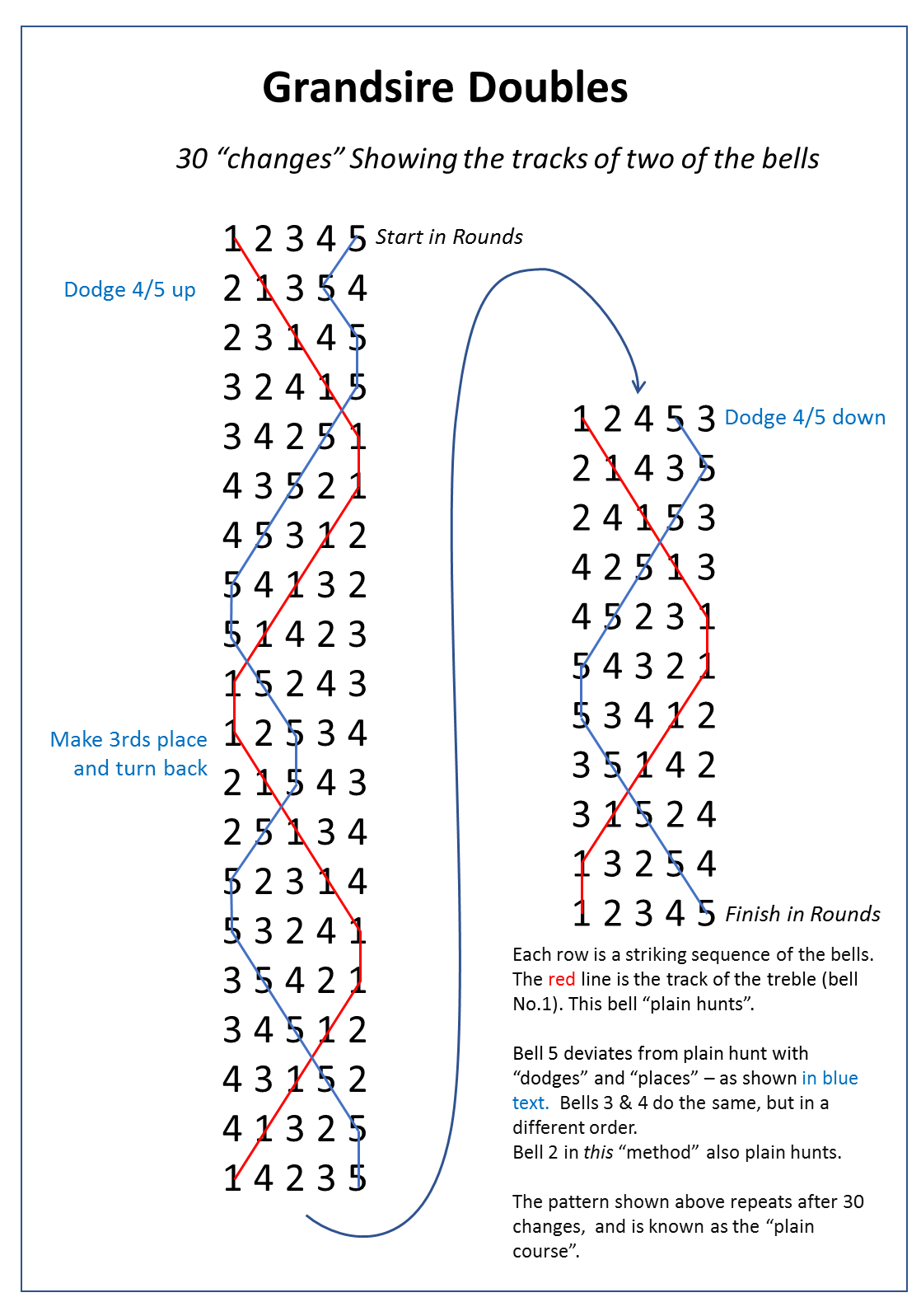
The "plain course" of Grandsire Doubles; 30 changes. This can be extended to the full extent of unique changes on five bells (120) by "calls" from a conductor which change the bells further

Full-circle Bells in English churches, though very carefully tuned in the diatonic (major) scale, are not used for melodies or tunes: they are rung in "changes". To take a very simple example, if a church has five bells in the key of C they will be numbered 1-2-3-4-5, 1, called the treble and having the highest note, (in this case G) and 5, the tenor, having the lowest – the keynote, C. If rung in order downwards they are said to be ringing "rounds." If the order changes according to a predetermined pattern, they are ringing the "changes" – hence this type of church bell ringing is usually known as change-ringing.

Because a bell's swing takes a determinate time which cannot be much altered by the ringer, changes can be produced only by a bell exchanging places with one next to it in the order. For instance, starting from rounds (12345) no. 3 can step down towards the front and move into 2nd place by exchanging with 2 to give 13245 or up to fourth place by exchanging with 4 to give 12435.

Until Stedman's time changes were produced by exchanging only one pair of bells at a time in this manner. The aim (remembering that in the early days there were never more than five bells in one tower) was to start from rounds, produce every possible change (an "extent") once and once only, finishing again with rounds. This is quite possible changing only one pair at a time or, "plain changes", but is a slow process and can be boring for those ringers whose bells do not change position for long periods.

Stedman's achievement was to develop methods – then known as "cross-changes" – which could relatively quickly produce an "extent" by changing more than one pair of bells at a time. For instance, starting with rounds on five bells (12345) one might move to 21354 then to 23145 and so on. The aim of producing an extent without repeating a change apart from rounds at the start and finish could now be realised more artistically and with more interest for the ringers. One of the very earliest methods, known as "Doubles and Singles" in Tintinnalogia, accompanies this article. The diagram shows the course of the lightest bell (1) and one other bell (in this case 2). All bells other than the 1 follow the same course as the 2 but start in different places. The "plain Course" of Grandsire Doubles, still commonly rung today, is also shown.

As more bells were added to towers, Stedman's methods were adapted to higher numbers. Since the number of possible changes varies with the factorial ( n! ) of the number of bells, it became impractical to ring extents on numbers above 7 (the extent on 10 bells would take around three months). Any performance of 5,000 (approximately 7!) changes or more became recognised as a peal, but still with the traditional restrictions that no change may be repeated and that a bell may exchange only with one adjacent in the row. Nowadays many hundreds of methods are practised; all, in some degree, owe a debt to Stedman's pioneering work which has value as well in mathematics (group theory) as well as bell-ringing.

== See also ==
- Albert J Pitman
- John Holt (composer)
