= Dove's Guide for Church Bell Ringers =

1950 book by Ronald Hammerton Dove

Cover of 7th edition

Title page of 7th edition

Dove's Guide for Church Bell Ringers (known to ringers as Dove's Guide or simply Dove) is the standard reference to the rings of bells hung for English-style full circle ringing. The vast majority of these "towers" are in England and Wales but the guide includes towers from the rest of the British Isles as well as a few from around the world (including the United States, Australia, Canada, Africa and New Zealand). The latest edition is Dove's Guide for Church Bell Ringers to the Rings of Bells of the World (11th Edition).

== History ==
The guide was first published in 1950 by Ronald Hammerton Dove (1 June 1906 – 19 March 2001) under the title A Bellringer's Guide to the Church Bells of Britain and Ringing Peals of the World. Previously the location of rings of bells was a matter only of local knowledge and hearsay. Dove produced eight editions of his guide between 1950 and 1994, managing to visit and ring at nearly all the ringable towers himself (a never-ending task as rings are continually added, removed or upgraded and, at least in the Guide's early years, rediscovered).

After 1994, he handed over responsibility for the Guide to the Central Council of Church Bell Ringers. The 11th edition (December 2018) is the most recent published as a book (now under the title Dove's Guide) and is also made available as a database for free access via the Internet: the Central Council continues to maintain the guide online.

== Contents ==
Entries in the Guide traditionally listed the town or village, the county (or country), the dedication (saint) of the church, the number of bells, the weight of the tenor (the largest bell) and its musical note, and the tower's usual practice night. It also noted whether the bells were in an unringable or unsafe condition. Appendices (not currently available online) also give information about rings of bells by number, weight, and county; a list of the heaviest bells in the British Isles; and details of changes since the previous edition. This information is helpful for those interested in trends over time. The online guide is, however, searchable by almost every criterion.

Although it was sometimes assumed to be exhaustive, Dove's Guide never pretended to be a complete catalogue. In fact, the Guide is under continual review and enhancement. Map grid references are now shown, and even details of towers as points of interest for users of satellite navigation systems: details of individual bells in each ring are being added gradually.

It is an invaluable aid for the holidaying bell ringer looking for a tower to visit, or for organising a tower grab (ringing outing). However, contact information for towers is still best obtained from individual websites and reports.

== Printed editions ==
Edition	Year	Title	Compiler	Publisher	Length
1st	1950	A Bellringer's Guide to the Church Bells of Britain and ringing peals of the world	Dove, Ronald H	W H Viggers, Aldershot	viii + 184pp
2nd	1956	A Bellringer's Guide to the Church Bells of Britain and ringing peals of the world	Dove, Ronald H	W H Viggers, Aldershot	x + 188pp
3rd	1962	A Bellringer's Guide to the Church Bells of Britain and ringing peals of the world	Dove, Ronald H	W H Viggers, Aldershot	xii + 194pp
4th	1968	A Bellringer's Guide to the Church Bells of Britain and ringing peals of the world	Dove, Ronald H	W H Viggers, Aldershot	x + 197pp
5th	1976	A Bellringer's Guide to the Church Bells of Britain and ringing peals of the world	Dove, Ronald H	W H Viggers, Aldershot	viii + 199pp
6th	1982	A Bellringer's Guide to the Church Bells of Britain and ringing peals of the world	Dove, Ronald H	W H Viggers, Aldershot	x + 206pp
7th	1988	A Bellringer's Guide to the Church Bells of Britain and ringing peals of the world	Dove, Ronald H	W H Viggers & Seven Corners Press Ltd, Guildford	x + 214pp
8th	1994	A Bellringer's Guide to the Church Bells of Britain and ringing peals of the world	Dove, Ronald H	Seven Corners Press Ltd, Guildford	x + 208pp
9th	2000	Dove's Guide for Church Bell Ringers to the Ringing Bells of Britain and the World.	Baldwin, John and Johnston, Ron	CCCBR, Guildford	vi + 236pp
10th	2012	Dove's Guide for Church Bell Ringers to the Ringing Bells of Britain and the World	Baldwin, John, Jackson, Tim & Johnston, Ron	CCCBR, Guildford	xiv + 306pp
11th	2018	Dove's Guide for Church Bell Ringers to the Ringing Bells of Britain and the World	Baldwin, John, Jackson, Tim & Johnston, Ron	CCCBR, Guildford	330pp
