= Manual bell ringing =

Ringing of the bells in Alsasua, on 5 May 2019, for the first time that year.

The manual ringing of bells is a traditional method of striking a bell using a rope or a handle attached to the bell. This method has been used for centuries in churches, schools, and other buildings in order to announce the start of a mass or an event, or to call the attention of the population.

Ringing bells manually consists of pulling the rope or handle in order to move the bell or the clapper from side to side, causing the bell to sound. Depending on the sounding mechanism, the bell can remain static, rock back and forth, or swing in a full circle. The bell ringer must pay diligent attention to the rhythm of the pulls in order to create a consistent and harmonious sound.

Ringing bells manually is an art and skill that requires practice and dedication. In some cases, bell ringers must learn complicated patterns and pulling sequences in order to produce elaborate musical compositions. Ringers are taught the skill of manual ringing through the passing down of knowledge from existing ringers, in a manner akin to an apprenticeship.

Despite the emergence of automated systems of ringing, many people still prefer manual bell ringing, as it allows a greater grade of control and personal expression. Some communities retain manual ringing for purposes where it is no longer necessary, such as warning against fires, under special circumstances such as heritage festivals.

In some places, manual bell ringing is considered an important part of cultural heritage to be conserved and transmitted from generation to generation. In 2022, UNESCO declared manual bell ringing a part of intangible cultural heritage.

== See also ==
- Veronese bell ringing
- Bolognese bell ringing
- Change ringing
- Full circle ringing
- International Museum of Manual Bell Ringing
