= Bolognese bell ringing =

Italian tradition of full circle ringing

Bolognese bell ringing is a tradition of ringing bells that developed in Bologna, present day Italy. A form of full circle ringing, it entails swinging bells to develop rhythmic patterns.

== History ==
During the 16th century there was a competitive spirit between Rome and Bologna. At that time the Basilica of San Petronio in Bologna was still under construction, and was intended to be greater than St. Peter's Basilica in the Vatican. Both cities were part of the Papal States, and both were considered capital cities of art and music.

There was also competition between two teams of bell ringers; from Bologna's Basilica of San Petronio and from Rome's Santa Cecilia's Church. Eager to prove their skills, the Bolognese bell ringers devised a regular and accurate method of ringing: each bell would have to ring once per rotation. This method soon spread through the city and its many bell towers, and reached nearby cities such as Ferrara, Modena and Faenza.

== Description ==
This bellringing system was originally designed for an ensemble of four or five bells. Nowadays it is also sometimes used for a set of six bells.

The bells are never counterbalanced. They are mounted on a wooden structure called the castle, and flanked by a wooden support called the goat. The bells are not very heavy, as the rotation has to be fast. Generally, every bell that weighs less than 800 kg (16 cwt) is rung by one person. The heaviest bell used with this system is in Bologna Cathedral, and is called la Nonna ("the Granny") and weighs 3.3 tonnes. Thirteen people are needed to ring a scappata or a calata with it.

In this method, the bell ringers have to be at the top of the bell tower, in contact with the bells. Mechanical devices are not allowed.

Bell ringers can ring in two different positions:

- within the castle (in front of the bells), pulling the ropes and controlling the clapper
- above the castle, where they can help to raise the bell with their feet and then move it by pulling and pushing the goat. These ringers are called travaroli, because they stand on travi, girders.

== Techniques ==
In Bolognese bell ringing, sets of bells are rung in four different techniques: scampanio ('chime'), doppio a cappio ('double loop'), tirate basse ('low pulls'), and doppio a trave ('double beam').

Bellringers ringing doppio a cappio at the bell tower of Antoniano dei Frati Minori

1. In scampanio, the bells are hung stationary with the mouth facing downwards. The clappers are attached to ropes that the bellringer can control using both hands and feet. This enables the ringing of complex melodies and harmonies. A fundamental melody is martellata di Chiesa, which consists of variations to invoke themes of the 18th century.
2. In doppio a cappio, a set of bells, beginning in the resting position with the mouth facing downwards, are swung using short ropes tied to the goat. The bellringers begin swinging the bells in, sometimes pushing or pulling the clapper to ring the bell when the rotation is not yet sufficient. Using increasingly wide swings, they gradually bring the bell into a "standing position" in which the bell is balancing at the top of its axis with the mouth facing upwards. At this point, the bellringers play a pezzo in piedi ('standing piece') – a rhythmic ringing pattern. At the end of the standing piece, the bells are then swung freely, gradually slowing until they return to the resting position.
3. In tirate basse, the bells are swung continuously with a low enough amplitude that the clapper does not ring the bell. The bellringers rhythmically increase the amplitude of individual rotations to obtain a pattern of notes from the swinging bells.
4. In doppio a trave, probably the oldest of the techniques, the bells are arranged with their mouths facing upwards and thrown into a full swing by the bellringers in a rhythmic pattern. They are caught following each full swing.

== See also ==
External videos
- Bells Of Bologna (1934), by British Pathé

- Veronese bell ringing
