= Mini-ring =

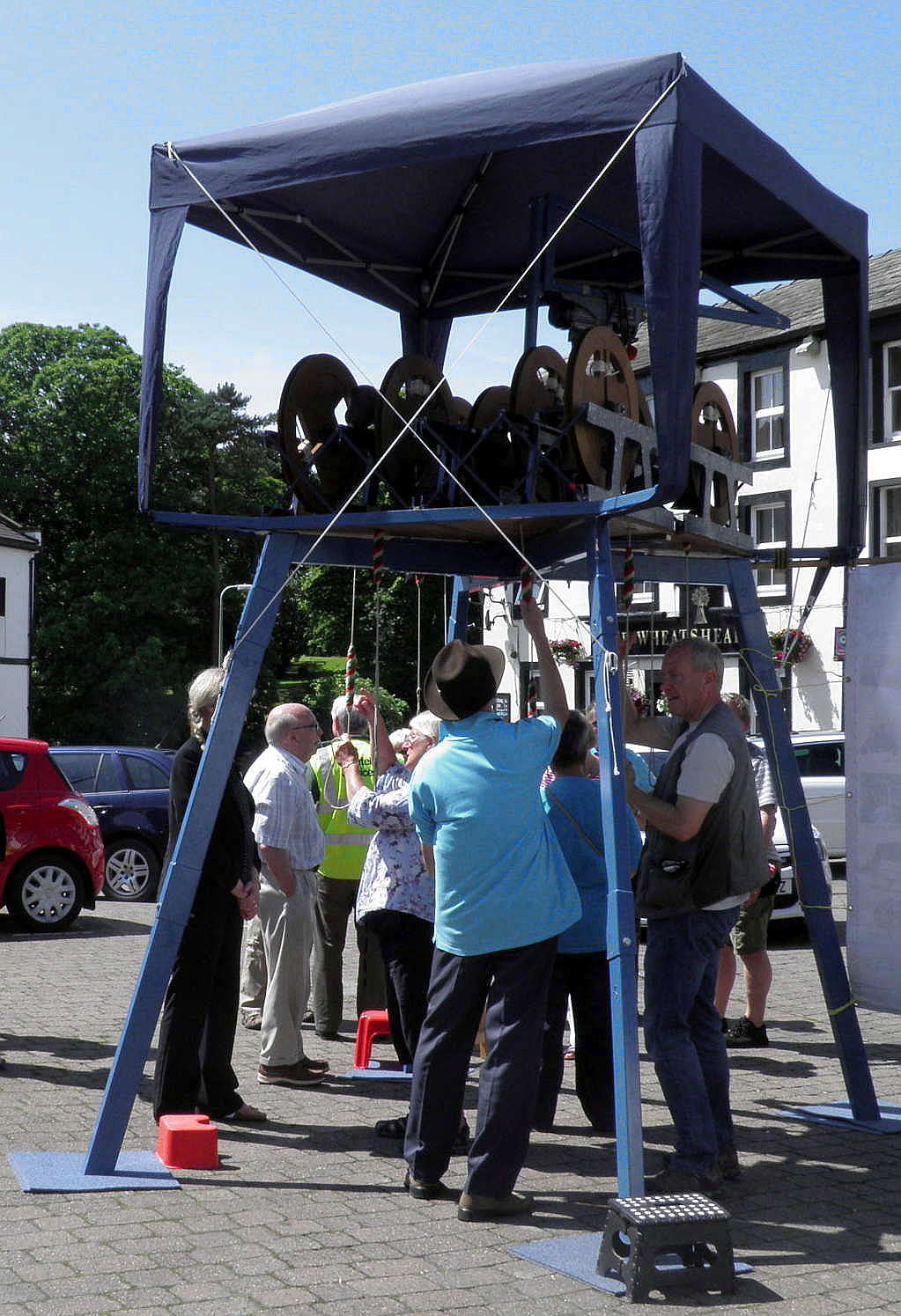
A portable mini-ring in Egremont, Cumbria

A Mini-Ring is a peal of small bells hung for change-ringing. They are used for training, demonstrational, and leisure purposes.

Although normally hung in secular or private settings, several mini-rings are hung in churches.
