= Full circle ringing =

Method of hanging (church) bells and ringing them in the "English tradition"

Bell-ringing at St Botolph's Aldgate, London

Full circle ringing is a technique of ringing a tower bell such that it swings in a complete circle from mouth upwards to mouth upwards and then back again repetitively. This can be contrasted with swing chiming in which the bell only traverses just enough of a circle arc to strike.

== English full-circle ringing technique ==
Full-circle tower bell ringing in England developed in the early 17th century when bell ringers found that swinging a bell through a much larger arc than that required for swing-chiming gave control over the time between successive strikes of the clapper. A bell swinging through a small arc acts as a simple pendulum, at a time interval governed by its size and shape. By swinging it through a much larger arc approaching a full circle, control of the strike interval can be exercised by the ringer. This culminated in the technique of full circle ringing, which enabled ringers to control the speeds of their individual bells accurately to sound them in orderly sequences. From this was born the art of change ringing.

Speed control is exerted by the ringer only when each bell is nearly mouth upwards and moving slowly near the balance point; this constraint and the rope manipulation involved normally requires that each bell has its own ringer. The tower bells involved range from a few hundredweight up to a few tons (Note: Traditionally bells are weighed in hundredweight-quarters-pounds. One (long) hundredweight is 112 lbs, or about 50 kg. There are 20 cwt to the long ton.) and are most commonly associated with churches as a means of calling the congregation to worship.

Beginning in the mid-1980s, smaller sets of bells, known as "mini-rings", have come into existence. Their primary applications are for training, demonstration or leisure purposes, with bells weighing anything from a matter of ounces, to two-and-a-half hundredweight. Most of these are in domestic settings and are privately owned, although some are owned by churches.

== Mechanics ==
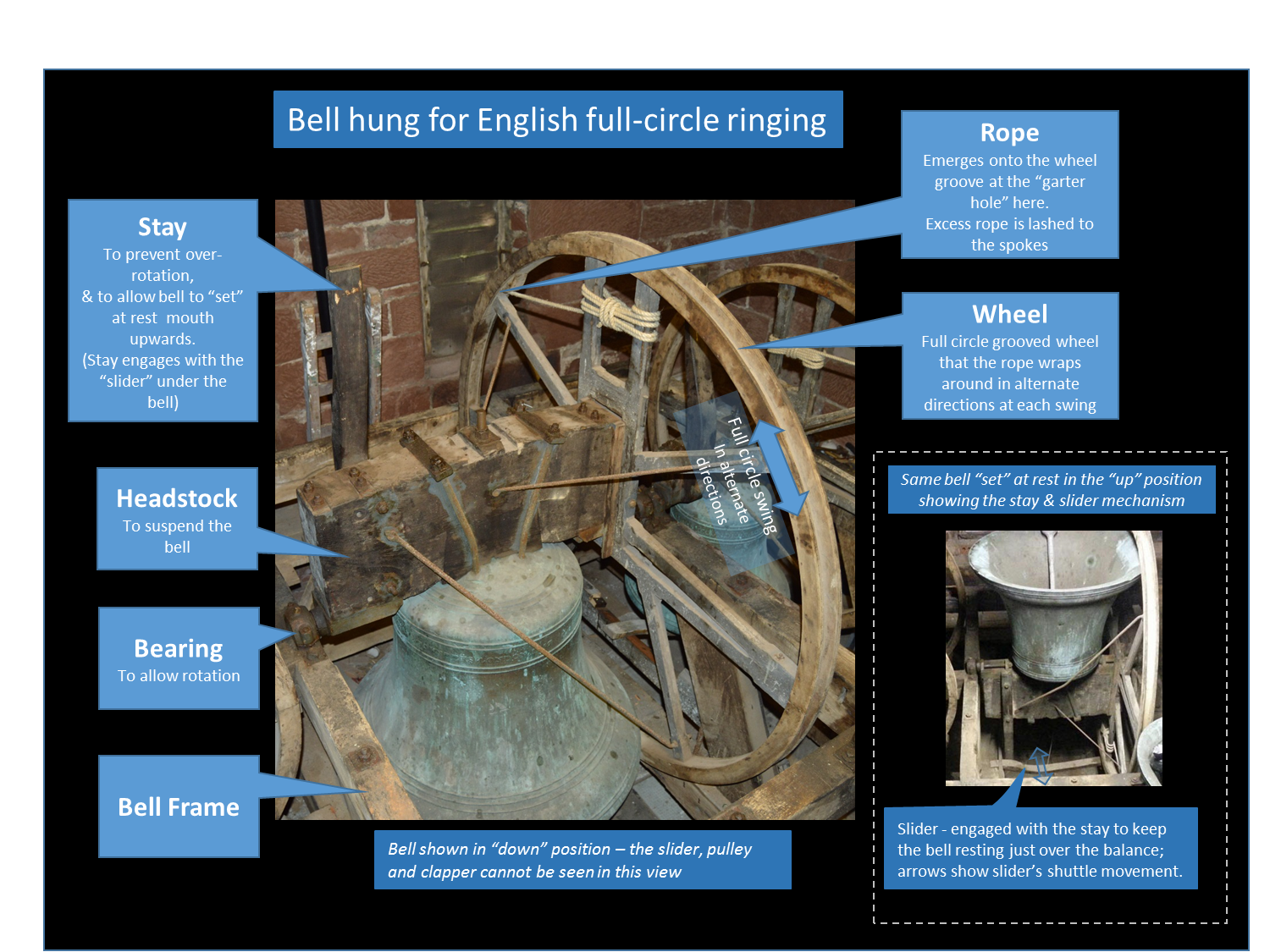
Mechanism of a bell hung for English full-circle ringing. The bell can swing through a full circle in alternate directions.

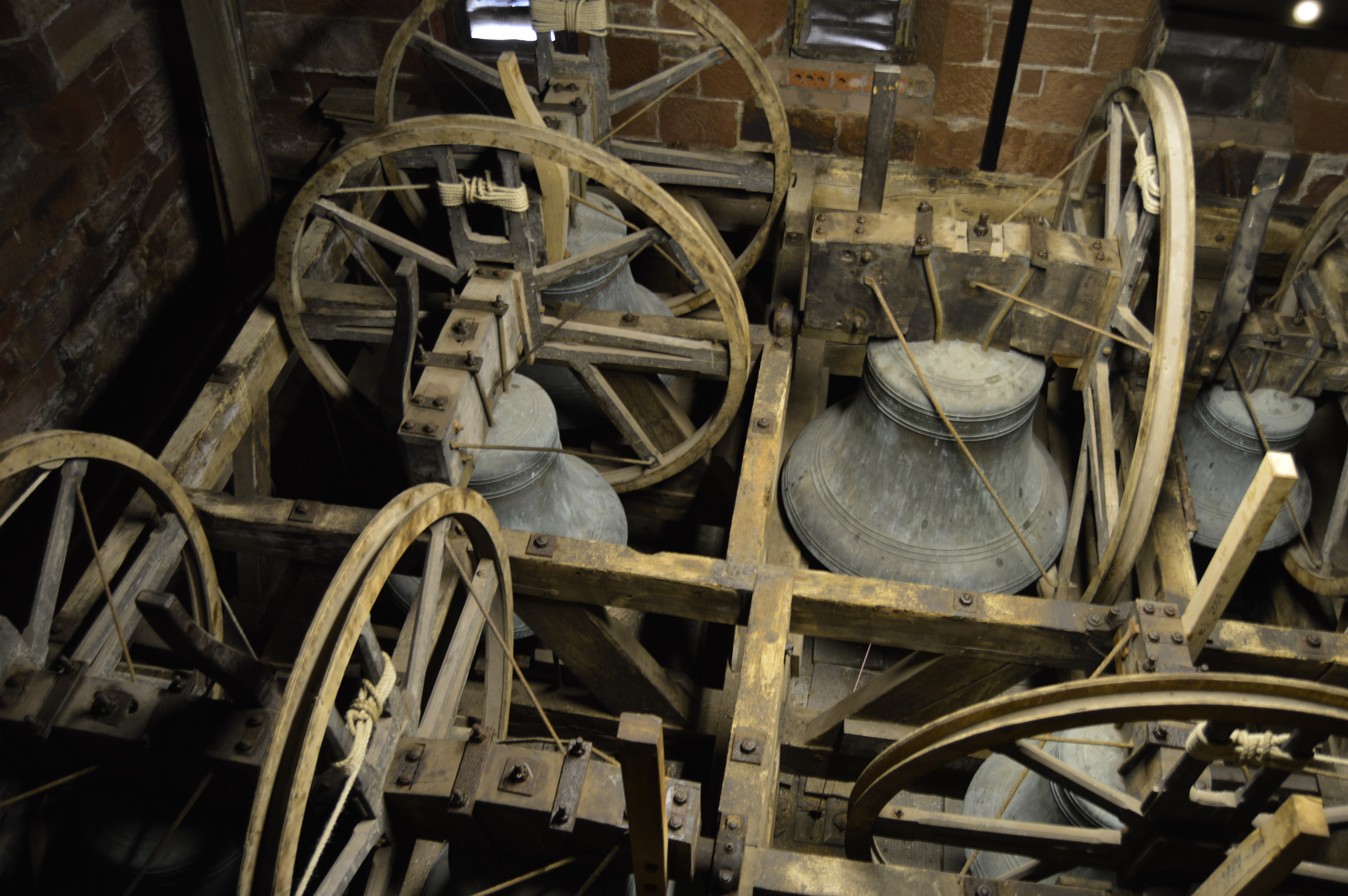
The bells of St Bees Priory shown in the "down" position, in which they are normally left between ringing sessions.

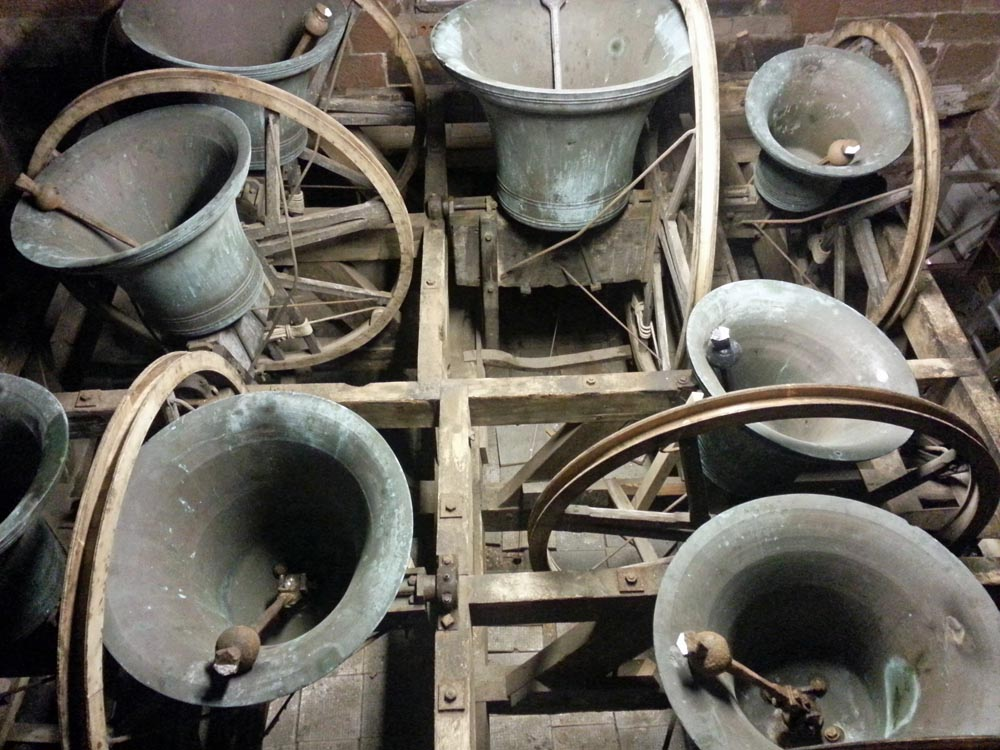
The bells of St Bees Priory shown in the "up" position. When being rung they swing through a full circle from mouth upwards round to mouth upwards, and then back again.

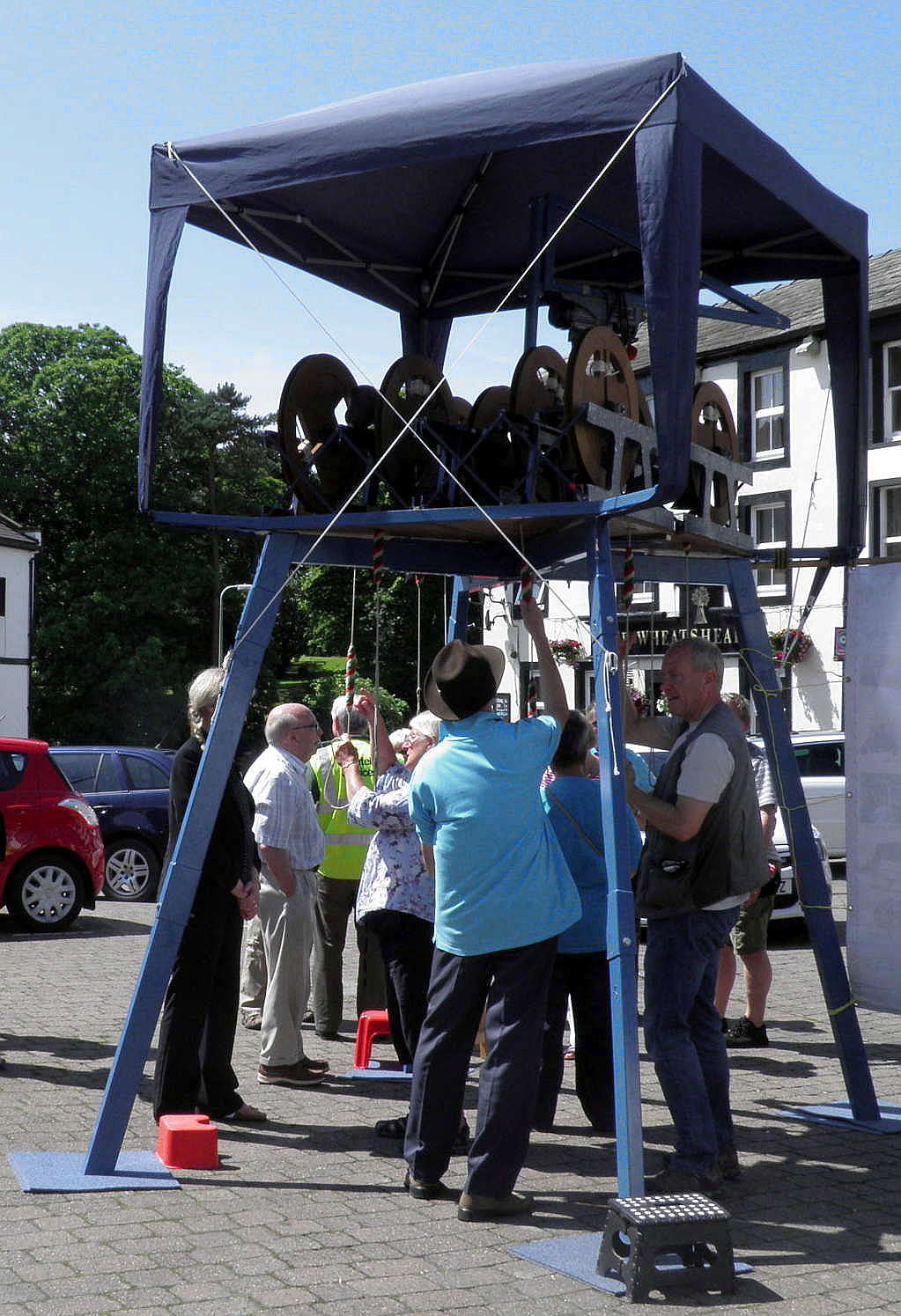
A mini ring is a portable ring of bells which demonstrates the English full-circle style of ringing. In this portable ring, the public can easily see how it works.

There are several variations of the means of exerting control of the bell by the ringers, but the fundamental principle of being able to control and alter the speed of the bell striking is common to all full circle techniques. Full circle ringing is a manual bell ringing technique.

The bell is attached to a headstock, historically made of wood but now more often steel. This has to withstand the dynamic force of the bell as it swings, up to three times its static weight. At each end of the headstock are protruding trunnions or bearing pins which are located in bearings attached to the frame. The frame is rigidly attached to the fabric of the tower.

Within the bell is a clapper which consists of a solid shaft, (wood, iron or steel) a clapper ball (wrought iron or steel) and a flight. The size of the flight determines the rate at which the clapper swings, and therefore the point in time at which it strikes the bell.

Bells are normally left mouth down (for safety). Before ringing, the bells are swung in increasing arcs until the bell is mouth uppermost. When the ringer desires to make a stroke, the bell is swung around a full circle, the clapper striking once.

There is no counter-balancing in English full-circle ringing, so the bell accelerates rapidly to its maximum velocity when mouth downwards and slows down as it rises to mouth upwards. In Veronese full-circle ringing there is a large amount of counter-balancing, so there is little net gravitation pull and the bell accelerates slowly and rotates gracefully. The small out-of-balance weight makes it much easier than English bells to stop the bells mouth upwards. However, English full-circle ringing is capable of much better control of bell speed, as it is independent of the counter-balance effect. The Bolognese style of bell hanging does not have any counter-balancing.

In English full circle ringing "mini-rings" are used to demonstrate how full-circle ringing on large bells works. These rings can be assembled quickly, but the bells are light and the ringing is fast. They demonstrate a difficult concept visually, as both the actions of the ringers and the bells can be seen simultaneously.

== The distinctive sound ==
The sound made by a bell rung full-circle has two unique subtle features: rapid strike decay and the Doppler effect.

Because the clapper strikes the bell as it rises to the mouth upwards position, it rests against the bell's soundbow after the strike. The peak strike intensity decays away quickly since the clapper helps dissipate the bell's vibration energy. This enables rapid successive strikes of multiple bells, such as in change ringing, without excessive overlap and consequent blurring of successive strikes. In addition, the movement of the bell imparts a Doppler effect to the sound, as the strike occurs whilst the bell is still moving.

Both these effects give full circle ringing of bells in an accurate sequence a distinctive sound which cannot be simulated by stationary chimed bells.

== Ringing styles ==
=== English ===
The bells are mounted within a bellframe of steel or wood, and each bell is suspended from a headstock fitted to bearings so that the bell may rotate.

The headstock is fitted with a wooden stay, which, in conjunction with a slider, limits maximum rotational movement to just over a full circle, and allows the bell to be set or rested mouth uppermost. A large wheel is fitted to the headstock, and the rope wraps and unwraps as the bell rotates backwards and forwards. Within the bell is a clapper that strikes the thickest part of the bell mouth called the soundbow. In English, ringing a set of bells is known as a "ring of bells", and an example of a ring of eight bells is shown mouth upwards in the rest position in the accompanying image.

The ringers stand in a ringing chamber below, and the ropes pass through holes in the ceiling. The rope has a woollen grip called the sally while the lower end of the rope is doubled over to form an easily held tail-end.

Bells hung in this fashion gave rise to the invention of English Change ringing in the 17th century because the bells' striking interval could be controlled. There are over 5,000 rings of bells in England, the vast majority in Anglican church towers, and an estimated 40,000 bell ringers.

==== Bell cage ====
At East Bergholt England's only bell cage is in the graveyard, where the bells are rung by the ringers standing beside the bells and pulling on the headstock directly, rather like the Bolognese technique described below.

=== Veronese ===
Veronese bells are rung with a wheel and rope but do not have stays. The bells often swing outside the towers and so the clappers are wired in case of breakages. The bells are usually at the top of high towers and are rung from the ground floor, so most of the rope is steel as is the wheel.

The Veronese bellringing art consists of slow moving pieces of music called by a Maestro.

=== Bolognese ===
Bolognese-style bells have neither stay nor wheel, but in place of the wheel is an A-frame. Like English bells they are not counter-balanced. The ringers are distributed below and among the bells, pulling on the A-frame either with their hands or by ropes. When the bells are being raised, the ringers may stand on the large wooden headstocks to impart the necessary force.

The Bolognese bell ringing art consists of prearranged methods rung at a rate of change similar to English call changes.

== See also ==
- The Australian and New Zealand Association of Bellringers
- Carillon
- Central Council of Church Bell Ringers
- Chime (bell instrument)
- Russian Orthodox bell ringing
- Manual bell ringing
