= List of people from Mechelen =

This is a list of Notable people from Mechelen, who were either born in Mechelen, or spent part of their life there.

== Born in Mechelen ==
=== Before 17th century ===
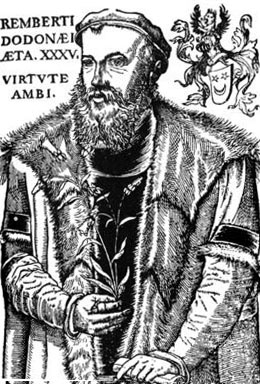
Rembert Dodoens

- Henry Bate of Malines (1246 – after 1310) philosopher, theologian, astronomer-astrologer, poet, and musician.
- Keldermans family of sculptors and architects, including Rombout II Keldermans (14th to 16th century)
- Jan Standonck, priest and reformer, Master of the Collège de Montaigu in Paris (1454–1504)
- Johannes Varennius (1462–1536), teacher at Collegium Trilingue, wrote: SYNTAXIS LINGVUAE GRAECAE… COLONIAE Martinus Gymnicus excudebat ANNO M.D.L.
- Gommaert van der Gracht, painter (c. 1590-1639)
- Ferry Carondelet, diplomat and abbot (1473–1528)
- Michiel Coxie, Renaissance painter and designer of engravings and tapestries (1499–1592)
- Rembert Dodoens, botanist, herbalist, and physician (1517–1585)
- Philippe de Monte, Renaissance composer (1521–1603)
- Crispin van den Broeck, painter (1523–1591)
- Alexandre Colin, sculptor (1526–1612)
- Gerhard Dorn, philosopher, translator, alchemist, physician, and bibliophile (c. 1530–1584)
- Philips van der Aa, statesman (d. 1586)
- Francis Coster, Jesuit and religious writer (1532–1619)
- Johan van der Veeken (1549-1616), wealthy shipowner, merchant, banker and cofounder of the VOC Rotterdam.
- Rinaldo del Mel, Franco-Flemish composer of the Renaissance (1554-c. 1598)
- François Stella (1563-1605), was a French Baroque painter
- David Vinckboons, painter (1576–1629)
- Diego de Astor, Spanish engraver and medalist (1587–1650)

=== 17th century until now ===
- Faydherbe family of mostly sculptors, including Lucas Faydherbe (16th and 17th century)
- Abraham van den Kerckhoven, organist and composer (c. 1618-c. 1701)
- Theodoor Verhaegen, sculptor (1701–1759)
- Lodewijk van Beethoven (1712–1770), Kapellmeister and grandfather of his namesake Ludwig van Beethoven
- Thomas de Paep, painter (ca. 1628-1630 – 1670)
- Jan Coxie, painter (1629 - 1670)
- Peter Franchoys, painter (1606 – 1654)
- Lucas Franchoys the Younger, painter (1616 – 1681)
- Jan Philip van Thielen, painter (1618 – 1667)
- Jean-Baptiste Debay, sculptor (1779-1863)
- Goswin de Stassart, politician (1780–1854)
- Msgr. Victor Scheppers (1802–1877), founder of the Brothers of Mercy of Mechelen and the Scheppersinstituut Mechelen.
- Egide Walschaerts, mechanical engineer (1820–1901)
- Jef Denyn, musician and founder of the Royal Carillon School (1862–1941)
- Rik Wouters, fauvist painter and sculptor (1882–1916)
- Jean-Baptiste Janssens, Superior General of the Society of Jesus (1889–1964)
- Adèle Colson, musician and first woman graduate of the Royal Carillon School (1905-1997)
- Gaston Relens, painter (1909-2011)
- Karel Verleye, co-founder of the College of Europe in Bruges (1920–2002)
- Philibert Mees, composer and pianist (1929–2006)
- Herman De Coninck, poet, essayist, journalist, and publisher (1944–1997)
- Luc Van den Brande, politician (b. 1945)
- Anne Teresa De Keersmaeker, choreographer (b. 1960)
- Bart Somers, politician and mayor (b. 1964)
- Steven Defour, football player playing for Royal Antwerp F.C.
- Dirk Van de Put, businessman, incoming CEO of Mondelez International

== Lived in Mechelen ==
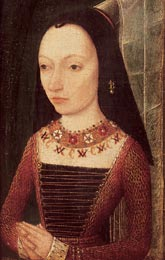
Margaret of York

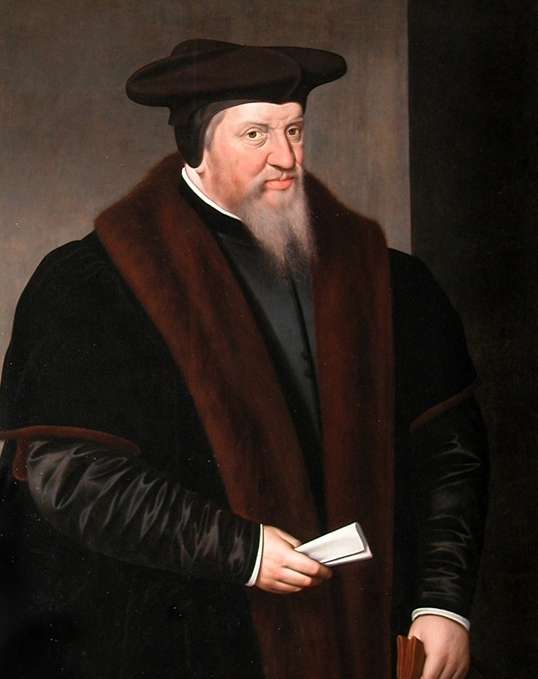
Viglius

- Margaret of York, Duchess of Burgundy (1446–1503)
- Pierre Alamire, music copyist, composer, instrumentalist, mining engineer, merchant, diplomat, and spy (c. 1470–1536)
- Philip the Handsome (also called "the Fair") (1478 – 1506), Duke of Burgundy and the first Habsburg King of Castile.
- Margaret of Austria, regent of the Belgium Austriacum, daughter of Maximilian I and guardian of Charles V (1480–1530)
- Mary, Eleanor and Isabella of Austria, nieces of Margaret of Austria
- John Heywood, English poet (1497-c. 1575)
- Charles V, Holy Roman Emperor, born in Ghent, and brought up in Mechelen until age 17 (1500–1558)
- Anne Boleyn, future wife of English King Henry VIII (1504–1536).
- John Clement, English humanist, tutor of Thomas More's children (16th century)
- Viglius, statesman and jurist (1507–1577)
- Johannes Secundus, Neo-Latin poet (1511–1536)
- Igram van Achelen, statesman (1528–1604)
- Franciscus Monachus, geographer and cosmographer (c. 1490-1565)
- François René Mallarmé, French politician in exile (1755–1835)
- Pierre François Xavier de Ram, churchman and historian (1804–1865)
- Florent Joseph Marie Willems, painter (1823–1905)
- Jean Baptiste Abbeloos, orientalist (1836–1906)
- Jules Van Nuffel, musicologist, composer, and expert on religious music (1883–1953)
- Alice Nahon, poet (1896–1933)
- Flor Peeters, composer, organist, and teacher (1903–1986)
- Alexander Rubens, Lord of Vremdyck, grandson of the painter Peter Paul.
- Maurits Sabbe, writer (1873–1938)
