= Franchoys =

Franchoys is a Flemish surname. Notable people with the surname include the following Flemish painters:

- Lucas Franchoys the Elder (1574–1643)
- Lucas Franchoys the Younger (1616–1681), son of Lucas and brother of Peter
- Peter Franchoys (1606–1654)
