= Nora Johnston =

English carillonneur and inventor (1886–1952)

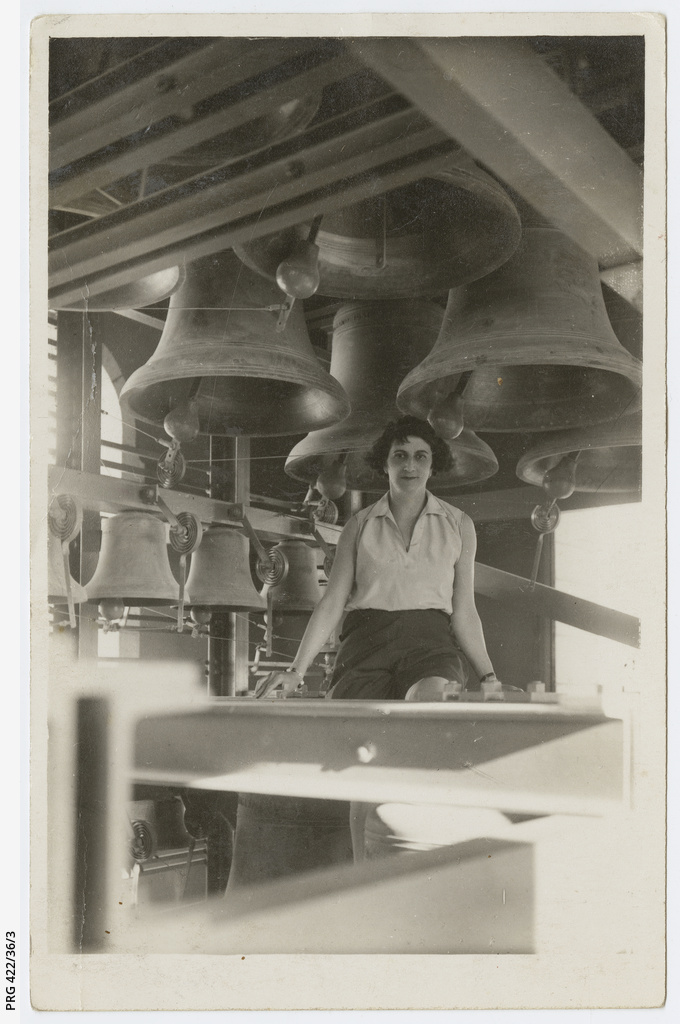
- Johnston at the Jerusalem International YMCA carillon in 1933
- Born: 1886
- Died: 1952 (aged 65–66)
- Education: Royal Carillon School "Jef Denyn"
- Occupations: Carillonneur; inventor
- Relatives: Cyril F. Johnston (brother); Jill Johnston (niece)

Nora Violet Johnston (1886 – 1952) was an English carillonneur and inventor, and one of only two female carillonneurs active in England during the first half of the twentieth century.

== Life and career ==
After an active career in theater, she studied with Jef Denyn at the Royal Carillon School in Belgium and earned her diploma on February 26, 1933, becoming the first Englishwoman to graduate from the school and one of only four women graduates up to that point. Before her graduation, she had already performed 23 concerts on a tour of Belgium and the Netherlands from 1927 to 1928. Together with Royal Carillon School assistant instructor Victor Van Geyseghem, she inaugurated the Jesus Tower carillon of the YMCA in Jerusalem on April 18, 1933. It became apparent, however, that as a woman she was unlikely to be appointed to a carillon position. Her struggle with alcoholism proved an additional barrier.

As the sister of English bell founder and carillon builder Cyril F. Johnston, Johnston invented her own mobile carillon, with tone bars and resonators substituting for bells. Production of the instrument cost a considerable amount of money and research. She travelled throughout England and the United States with the mobile carillon, performing and lecturing. Newspapers often focused on her uniqueness as a female carillonneur, and in 1937 The Washington Post highlighted her habit of wearing shorts or riding breeches in order to play the carillon pedalboard. Seeking to establish higher visibility in a field that remained largely closed to women, she appeared on Pathé News in the 1950 newsreel "'Moo-Sic' Till The Cows Come Home," playing her mobile carillon for cows on the Manor Farm in Thorpe, Surrey. The experiment was intended to demonstrate that music increased the milk yield of cows.

Johnson was received by Eleanor Roosevelt at the White House on her first American tour in 1937, and performed at the baptism of Prince Charles in 1948. As a member of the family business Gillett & Johnston bellfoundry, she gave concerts on temporary carillon installations at the Newcastle Exhibition Park, in Hyde Park where her audience was estimated to number over 100,000, and for Prince George. She inaugurated a carillon-like installation, played from the theater organ console, at the Regal Cinema in London. Her memoir, completed on October 14, 1947, was published posthumously by her niece Jill Johnston in 2002.

== See also ==
- Gladys Elinor Watkins – New Zealander music teacher and carillonneur (1884–1939)
