= The Prisoner of Sex =

1971 book by Norman Mailer

- Cover of the first edition
- Author: Norman Mailer
- Language: English
- Publisher: Little, Brown and Company
- Publication date: 1971
- Publication place: United States
- Media type: Print

The Prisoner of Sex is a non-fiction work by American author Norman Mailer, first published in 1971, that responds to the rise of second-wave feminism and specifically critiques the arguments made by feminist writers such as Kate Millett. Commissioned originally as a long-form article for Harper’s Magazine, the book blends memoir, literary criticism, and polemic as Mailer confronts what he perceives as the movement's reductionist views on sex, power, and literature. Notorious for its provocative tone and contentious engagement with feminist theory, The Prisoner of Sex both reflected and intensified the cultural debates of the era, solidifying Mailer's reputation as a polarizing voice in American letters.

== Background ==
The Prisoner of Sex (POS) became Mailer's nineteenth major publication, following the release of King of the Hill: Norman Mailer on the Fight of the Century in the same year. POS follows Mailer's early, critically acclaimed fiction of the 1940s and 1950s and reflects his shift into Literary nonfiction and New Journalism throughout the 1960s and 70s. In response to the rapidly shifting social and political climate of the mid-twentieth century, Mailer found success using the conventions of fiction in journalistic writing alongside fellow new journalists such as Joan Didion and Truman Capote.

Entering this genre with Armies of the Night, Mailer began writing about himself from the third-person perspective, departing from the third-person omniscient and first-person perspectives used in his early fiction. This technique became a hallmark of Mailer's nonfiction, including The Prisoner of Sex.

POS is Mailer's response to the 1960s women's liberation movement, though he primarily offers a critique of literary critic Kate Millett. In Sexual Politics, Millett delivers a sustained critique of Mailer, primarily in Chapter 8, where she analyzes his novel An American Dream alongside brief references to Advertisements for Myself and The Naked and the Dead. Millett portrays Mailer as emblematic of a masculine literary tradition that glorifies aggression and sexual domination. She argues that An American Dream in particular presents male violence as thrilling and redemptive: "In the dream world of Norman Mailer, male supremacy is taken for granted, and the expression of its power, even in violence, is assumed to be exhilarating and necessary". For Millett, this is not incidental but central to Mailer’s artistic and ideological vision.

She further contends that Mailer equates masculinity with domination and femininity with submission, reducing complex interpersonal relationships to hierarchies of power. "The male is above all the aggressor", she notes, "the female his passive object". Millett frames this dynamic as not merely psychological but deeply political—an artistic enactment of patriarchy itself.

Mailer is also positioned as part of a larger lineage—alongside Henry Miller and D. H. Lawrence—that uses literature to reinforce misogynistic values. According to Millett, these writers contribute to a cultural framework that marginalizes women and celebrates male potency as a literary virtue: "The literature of Lawrence, Miller, and Mailer shows how deep the masculine bias runs in modern letters, shaping values, aesthetics, and definitions of power". Subsequently, critics like Merrill, Paglia, and Steiner accuse Millett of distorting the literary intentions of the authors she critiques unfairly truncating quotations, severing qualifications and afterthoughts, and only retaining sentences that reinforce both men as sexist. Her desire to impugn them by overlooking quotations that do otherwise runs against scholarly and critical principles. Mailer gives multiple examples of these distortions, and states: "the bloody ground steamed with the limbs of every amputated quote".

Millett's critique paints Mailer as a writer whose sexual politics are not only regressive but dangerously seductive, masked in the language of artistic freedom and existential depth. These charges would serve as the primary target of Mailer’s combative response in POS.

== Style ==
POS presents Mailer's style as forceful and urgent. Wording that might appear uncomfortable to some readers was the forefront of his work. He exposed the uncomfortable, the tough conversations, and the unasked questions. Known as a defining writer in the world of journalism, Mailer used hard-hitting topics to get his opinions across. In this work, Mailer approaches his opinion as a response to Millett's critique of women's liberation.

According to J. Michael Lennon, Mailer’s writing style was marked by his distinctive use of metaphor, which Lennon described as one of his most significant linguistic talents. Influenced early on by editorial feedback, Mailer developed a wide-ranging and often visceral metaphorical style that became a hallmark of his prose. His metaphors, often carnal and vivid, served as vehicles for complex ideas and thematic resonance throughout his career.

Even Mailer’s literary style is suspect in Millett’s account. His confessional and self-mythologizing prose, especially in Advertisements, is seen as a rhetorical strategy to elevate personal pathology into literary insight. She claims that Mailer “presents a view of the world that is both obsessed with his own sexual anxieties and determined to transform those anxieties into a moral or aesthetic vision".

Focusing on gender roles and female ideology, Mailer uses third-person persona to express his viewpoint on the changes that occur when the human subconscious is suppressed. His viewpoint was criticized by female social and literary critics who labeled him as a feminist anathema.

== Summary ==
Mailer structures POS into four sections, and each section casts the author in a different role to explain an aspect of his views on women's liberation. Mailer's persona learns from his secretary that he is rumored to receive a Nobel Prize. Having already won the Pulitzer Prize, he did not feel thrilled in receiving the news of winning another prize and was more concerned with his recent separation from his fourth wife. He decides to name himself FNPW-Falso Nobel: Prize Winner, Prisoner of War, Prisoner of Wedlock, or Prisoner of Prizewinner. He heads to Maine to spend the next six-weeks of the summer with his five children as a “housewife” with a mistress and a maid.

=== The Prize Winner ===
The Prisoner embarks on vacation for the summer to care for his children after a false rumor emerged of him possibly winning a Nobel Prize. The Prizewinner’s ghost-phallus remained in New York, while the prisoner of wedlock enjoyed his time with his children in Maine. Norman Mailer suffered from gastral issues after reading Thinking About Women by Mary Ellmann. Mailer read the article New American Review by Kate Millett and describes her as a gossip columnist.

He writes, "He could not know whether he would have found it endurable to be born a woman or if it would have driven him out onto the drear avenues of the insane." The remainder of the section consists of Mailer writing about the growing women's liberation movement and the backlash against his work he received from these "enraged Amazons, an honor guard of revolutionary vaginas," and concluding that he needed to further articulate his thoughts about women.

PW ends the section listing life themes that depress him, and he describes how difficult it is for him to write about Women's Liberation honestly.

=== The Acolyte ===
Mailer, understood to be an acolyte in the title, begins by surveying the writings and participants of the women's liberation movement and considers women as a class in economic terms. He discusses female neurosis, blaming a woman's period for car crashes, increased admission to mental hospitals, and crime, which plays a part in a larger argument about the inherent physical strength of women compared to men. Mailer discusses the philosophical and existential purpose of the female orgasm and what it means for men and mankind when women figure out how to orgasm without the assistance of a penis. The clitoral orgasm where no man or phallus is needed, as opposed to a vaginal orgasm, is an aspect of the women's liberation movement that shows Mailer's inner fear of not being "needed."

=== The Advocate ===
Mailer offers a critique of the work of Millett. He opens the section by proclaiming that "by any major literary perspective, the land of Millett is a barren and mediocre terrain." He discusses Millet's assessment of his work and two of his favorite literary figures, Miller and Lawrence. He critiques her use of quotes and the conclusions that she comes to through her choice of quotes. He believes that she does not give the authors any credit for the work they did to understand women, taking issue with her only drawing attention to their oppression of women. He continues his discussion of sex by debating the power dynamics of male prison sex, equating power and dominance to manliness, and submission and penetration to the societal example of a woman. Mailer makes the case that succumbing to the natural depth of womanhood and manhood is a necessity, essentially arguing that womanhood is based on the confines of the womb. His discussion turns into the evolution of sex as a transaction. In prison, sex is a transaction, a transaction of power. Mailer writes that heterosexual sex became transactional and more like homosexual sex with the invention of the pill, as there is no chance of conception. Only power, cruelty, lust, desire, or pleasure is traded.

=== The Prisoner ===
Mailer discusses the genetics of sex and how it is determined beyond basic chromosomal knowledge. He theorizes how the determination of sex may, through the selective fertilization of an egg, have a larger meaning than just chance. Mailer discusses how even the choice of a woman to have sex with a particular man has an impact on the outcome of a child, putting great meaning on the act of sex. Mailer concludes the book by coming full circle to his own life. He describes an example of a couple where responsibilities are shared and given equal importance. His work should not suffer unless her work were more important than his—and he thinks that is impossible. Mailer makes a final call for succumbing to the differences between the sexes that are rooted in biological differences. A perfect world for Mailer would be one in which "people would found their politics on the fundamental demands they make of sex," one in which women's liberation supporters would accept that liberation from sex simply is not possible.

== Themes ==
=== Gender in society ===
Mailer offers differing views of women. He states that "his respect for the power of women was so large that…[it] would tear through him" before later arguing that women should be kept in cages. He stands by his statement that he does not hate women—even though some other parts of the book seem to contradict this. He states that his past writings do not reflect his actual beliefs; however, his statements often contradict this. Mailer writes about how the "goal" of women's liberation seeks to destroy the separation and uniqueness of the two sexes, which in turn would ruin the sacred and essential natural design of sex. Gender and sexuality are described with reverence and a belief that they are part of nature's "spiritual design," and that sexual technologies and the changing social constructs of gender were contributing to the demise of the "majesty of men and women fucking."

=== Power dynamics between the sexes ===
The Women's Liberation movement encouraged equal treatment for both women and men, and Mailer "is too afraid that similarity will disrupt the social and sexual 'balance' achieved by masculinity and femininity" that he believed to be necessary. This leads to his concern with the development of technology. There is an overarching sense of fear that the development of technology will make people obsolete and erase individuality. With the development of technology related to contraception, he is concerned that men would become less necessary for sex, giving women a monopoly over the power of creation. Mailer is concerned that the development of technology will upset the necessary social balance between men and women, stating that the use of birth control makes sex a “transaction—when no hint remains of the awe that a life in these circumstances can be conceived.”

=== Heterophobia ===
Mailer explores the distinctions between his views on gender and those associated with fascist ideology. While acknowledging surface-level similarities in language, Mailer emphasizes a fundamental difference: unlike fascism, which he argues suppressed instincts and portrayed femininity as radical, he views men and women as inherently different but equally influenced by both masculine and feminine psychological traits. He rejects traditional associations of strength with heterosexual masculinity and weakness with femininity, arguing that such oppositions are misleading. Mailer believed that men and women are very different creatures. He believes that men should be known for their strength and instincts, while women are objectified based on emotional disparities.

Mailer sees the subconscious as an important source of gut feelings, instincts, and mental well-being, and he warns that ignoring it can be harmful. At the same time, he’s careful not to idealize instincts too much, pointing out that fascist regimes—especially the Nazis—used that kind of talk to manipulate people. He also warns against strict ideas about gender, saying they can support sexist systems and open the door to authoritarian rule disguised as tradition.

== Publication history ==
POS was published in 1971 by Little, Brown and Company. It originated as an essay in Harper's Magazine's entire March 1971 edition. Harper's included a preface to the essay assuring readers that Mailer's work on the women's liberation focused on men and women's sexual relationships. Willie Morris the editor in chief of Harper's Magazine was disturbed by The Prisoner of Sex's sexual discussion and resigned in 1971. The Prisoner of Sex became a finalist for the 1972 National Book Awards for Contemporary Affairs presented by the National Book Foundation for its influence on the women's liberation movement.

== Critical response ==
POS provoked significant controversy upon its release, generating a wide range of critical reactions. Reactions were sharply divided.

Feminist critics responded harshly to POS. Germaine Greer, who appeared alongside Mailer at the 1971 Town Hall panel later featured in the documentary Town Bloody Hall, accused him of attempting to "transform feminism into another battle of the books in a war in which he had been campaigning all his life". Kate Millett characterized it as a diversionary tactic that avoided engaging the actual structures of gender oppression.

Brigid Brophy, reviewing the book in The New York Times Book Review, dismissed it as "modeled on a dribble: long and barely continuous", faulting both its logic and prose style. Laura Adams observed that Mailer portrayed himself simultaneously as both martyr and provocateur, seeking vindication while provoking feminist backlash. The result was a self-portrait of a male writer deeply entangled in the very anxieties about power, gender, and sexuality that feminism sought to expose.

Some responses, however, were more favorable. Anatole Broyard, in The New York Times, praised the book as "Mailer's best", citing its rhetorical flair and force of personality. Joyce Carol Oates, though critical of Mailer's position, acknowledged the passion of his prose and considered his voice "visionary" and "ardent", especially in its engagement with women as metaphysical figures. V. S. Pritchett similarly described the work as possessing a "heroic mysticism of the body".

Other critics faulted the book for lacking substantive engagement with feminist arguments. Robert Merrill contended that POS amounted to "a personal quarrel gratuitously elevated to the level of an exemplary debate", and failed to grapple with feminism as a serious intellectual movement. Diana Trilling, by contrast, praised Mailer's attempt to wrestle with the cultural implications of feminism, describing his "poetry of biology" as a preferable alternative to the rejection of biology she found in Millett's work.

The book was a commercial success, chosen by the Book-of-the-Month Club and widely read in both feminist and literary circles. Yet its reception marked a turning point in Mailer's public persona. As Carl Rollyson notes, the controversy surrounding POS became a pretext for critics to launch broader attacks on Mailer's decades-long literary treatment of gender, power, and sexuality.

=== Town Bloody Hall ===
On April 30, 1971, Norman Mailer participated in a public debate touted as a "Dialogue on Women's Liberation" at New York's Town Hall alongside prominent feminists including Germaine Greer, Diana Trilling, Jacqueline Ceballos, and Jill Johnston. The event, organized by the Theatre for Ideas, was framed as a response to The Prisoner of Sex and Mailer's challenge to feminist theory.

Mailer acted as moderator and spoke first, defending his views on sexuality and gender roles as outlined in The Prisoner of Sex. Greer criticized Mailer for attempting to reframe feminism as a personal contest of literary wills, arguing that he was "turning feminism into another battle of the books". Johnston mocked the debate's framing by performing a satirical dance with another woman on stage, underscoring what she saw as the absurdity of engaging Mailer's masculinist rhetoric. Audience members, who often directed their questions directly to Mailer and not the panel, were often raucous and critical. The discussion became increasingly contentious, marked by interruptions and heated exchanges.

The event was filmed by Chris Hegedus and D. A. Pennebaker and later released in 1979 as the documentary Town Bloody Hall. The film has since been noted for capturing the contentious reception of POS and the gender politics of Mailer's public persona during the early 1970s.
