= Town Bloody Hall =

1979 American documentary film

- Directed by: Chris Hegedus; D. A. Pennebaker
- Produced by: Chris Hegedus; D. A. Pennebaker
- Starring: Germaine Greer; Norman Mailer; Jill Johnston; Jacqueline Ceballos; Diana Trilling; Susan Sontag; Betty Friedan
- Cinematography: Jim Desmond; D. A. Pennebaker; Mark Woodcock
- Edited by: Chris Hegedus
- Production company: Pennebaker Hegedus Films
- Distributed by: Pennebaker Films
- Release date: 1979
- Country: United States
- Language: English

Town Bloody Hall is a 1979 American documentary film of a panel debate between feminist advocates and activist Norman Mailer.

Filmed on April 30, 1971, in The Town Hall in New York City. Town Bloody Hall features a panel of feminist advocates for the women's liberation movement and Norman Mailer, author of The Prisoner of Sex (1971). Chris Hegedus and D. A. Pennebaker produced the film, which stars Jacqueline Ceballos, Germaine Greer, Jill Johnston, Diana Trilling and Norman Mailer. The footage of the panel was recorded and released as a documentary in 1979.

Produced by Shirley Broughton, the event was originally filmed by Pennebaker. The footage was then filed and rendered unusable. Hegedus met Pennebaker a few years later, and the two edited the final version of the film for its release in 1979. Pennebaker described his filming style as one that exists without labels, in order to let the viewer come to a conclusion about the material, which inspired the nature of the Town Bloody Hall documentary. The recording of the debate was intended to ensure the unbiased documentation, allowing it to become a concrete moment in feminist history.

== Summary ==
The film begins making a statement on the issues of class and accessibility within women's liberation, with hecklers outside the building shouting that Germaine Greer "betrays the poor". Inside the theatre, Norman Mailer begins the panel discussion, and introduces his own work The Prisoner of Sex in Harper's magazine. He says that the women's liberation movement is against his work which was advertised as "the piece that's gonna have women's lib, ah, picketing the newsstands" yet believes the women's liberation movement is "the most important single intellectual event of the last few years".

Jacqueline Caballos, the president of the New York chapter of the National Organization for Women, believes that Norman Mailer represents the establishment, and therefore her participation has allowed her to work within the system. She admits to her privilege as a middle-class woman and mentions the perception of the National Organization for Women as "square". She then clarifies that the main agenda of the organization is solely women's liberation, and they do not devote time to fighting for the peace movement, civil rights movement, or the changing environment. The organization believes that women's liberation is the center of everything, and only upon that will it be focused.

The next speaker featured is Germaine Greer, an Australian feminist writer. She represents women writers in a traditionally male-dominated field, specifically in reference to her juxtaposition with the powerful and privileged Mailer in comparison to herself. She believes men are allowed to be vulnerable to create, but women are not given the same luxury. She believes the feminist revolution will change the way art is distinguished by the shift from inaccessibility and rarity, to the public itself.

Jill Johnston introduces lesbian feminism, in which she argues all women are lesbians. She argues the need for all women to accept themselves as lesbians in order to create substantive political change. She reiterates that lesbianism is used as an insult when women are feminists when in reality they are just learning to love themselves in order to be equal to men. At this point in the film, two women come to the stage and begin kissing and rolling on the floor, much to the dismay of Mailer. Eventually, they walk off the stage and do not return.

Diana Trilling closes the speeches with her take of sexual liberation. She states that the sexual repression of homosexuals continues onto the sexualities of women, with a cultural belief that there is no such thing as the female orgasm. She diversifies what it means to be a sexually active person, as she believes there is no single definition of sexual desire. Trilling believes Mailer "fails to imagine ... the full humanity of women as it would never fail in its imagination of the full humanity of men".

The town hall includes the debate between the participants, mainly between Trilling and Greer, and Mailer and Greer. Mailer focuses on the role of men, noting that these women fail to address the fact that life is also difficult for men. He also states that there is no one way to approach activism, and that movements need to be taken in a way that addresses norms in order to move against them. Mailer then changes the subject to speak about the academic and historical work of women's oppression to which Greer responds that the work is lengthy and complicated, and will take many years to establish. Mailer questions how women can make assumptions about their oppression without having historical work to back it up. Greer notes that patriarchy has an effect on everyone, including men.

Other feminist icons and personalities are featured in the film during the question period, such as Betty Friedan, criticizing Mailer's moderating skills, Susan Sontag, who criticizes Mailer's gendered language, Cynthia Ozick, who criticizes Mailer's chauvinism and Anatole Broyard, who asks about post-liberation narratives.

== Participants ==
=== Jill Johnston ===
"Lesbian Feminism" consists of understanding womanhood as perpetual lesbianism. In order for women to feel liberated and self-assured, they need to love themselves, thus making them lesbians. Her feminist principles are focused around self-love and the needs for self-determination within the feminist movement. As a leader of the sexual revolution in the 1960s and 1970s, Johnston faced an enormous backlash from conservatives, which created a lasting effect on her ability to advocate for "lesbian feminism". Following this backlash, she rebranded her activism as a period piece and wrote a biography called England's Child: The Carillon and the Casting of Big Bells, which connected her own goals to the role of her father, whom she had never met.

=== Diana Trilling ===
Diana Trilling focuses on the intersections between gender and sexuality. Women's sexuality is consistently repressed, and so is that of homosexuals. As such, sexual liberation (of homosexuals as well) is required for women to be liberated from social norms.

=== Jacqueline Ceballos ===
Jacqueline Ceballos focuses primarily on second wave feminism, without any intersectional approach. Women's liberation is the source of all inequalities, and therefore looking at the ways these inequalities interact is an afterthought.

=== Germaine Greer ===
Germaine Greer attempts to deconstruct gender roles such as womanhood and femininity. Greer believes that women should strive to free womanhood, not to attempt to become equal to men. It has been critiqued however that Germaine Greer does not advocate for women who do not "rise to her own notion of womanhood". She believes women should have children and tends towards non-interventionism, even when intervention has been asked for by the oppressed. However, she has also been respected as someone who can pitch liberal feminism to traditionally conservative middle classes while still having them agree to it.

== Public response ==
The public general reaction was one of entertainment and approval. Jerry Tallmer of the Downtown Express wrote of Norman Mailer "at his thoughtful best", and watching the film was "for all these laughs. Jill Johnston and all these lesbians ganging up on Norman". Mark Holcomb of The Village Voice indicated the modern need for such a movement and the intensities that go along with that movement, saying, "what finally makes Town Bloody Hall so compelling – and unsettling – is the impression that such serious spirited debate is a thing of the past". Referred to as a "battle of the sexes" in Variety, the film was acknowledged as one of great societal and activist influences on women's liberation at the time.

== The Town Hall Affair ==
The Town Hall Affair by The Wooster Group is a performance based on Town Bloody Hall. The production performed at the Performing Garage in New York City, in Los Angeles and San Francisco, and it appeared as an Australian exclusive at the Sydney Festival in 2018. Directed by Elizabeth LeCompte, it features Ari Fliakos, Greg Mehrten, Erin Mullin, Scott Shepherd and Maura Tierney. The Village Voice boasts about how it "captures the debate's strange theatricality and allows it to throw the sexual politics of our own moment into stark relief".
