= Gladys Elinor Watkins =

New Zealander music teacher and carillonneur (1884–1939)

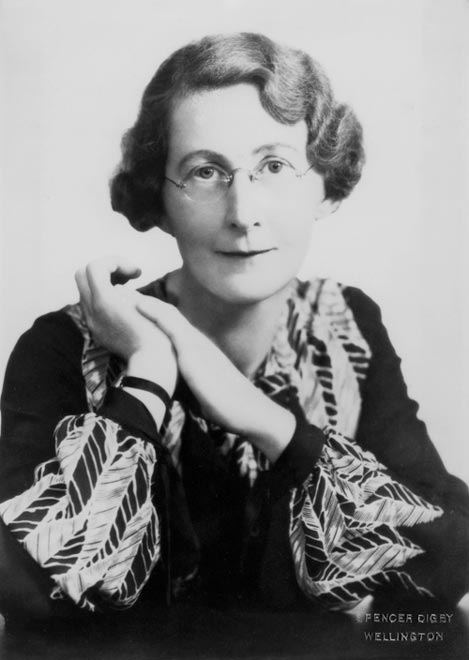
- Watkins photographed by Spencer Digby
- Born: 20 October 1884; Akaroa, New Zealand
- Died: 30 October 1939 (aged 55); Wellington, New Zealand
- Occupations: Music teacher; singer
- Years active: 1901–36
- Known for: being the first carillonneur of the National War Memorial Carillon

Gladys Elinor Watkins (20 October 1884 – 30 October 1939) was a New Zealand music teacher, singer, and pianist. However, she is most notable for being the first official carillonneur of the National War Memorial Carillon in Wellington.

== Early life ==
Gladys Watkins was born in Akaroa, New Zealand on 20 October 1884. Her parents, Elizabeth Pavitt and Stephen Watkins, were both born in England. Gladys Watkins was educated in Wellington, where she attended Miss Freeman's School, located first in Ellice Street, Mount Victoria, and later in Woolcombe Street (The Terrace), where it became known as Chilton House. The details of Watkins's early musical training are unknown, but by the second decade of the twentieth century she was a prominent member of Wellington's musical community, performing as a pianist and singer. Alongside numerous piano and vocal recitals, and choral concerts, Watkins was part of an ensemble that provided concerts for the officers and men at the YMCA Hall at the Trentham Camp during World War I.

== Travel to Belgium ==
Watkins achieved national prominence in the late 1920s. The government had approved funds of £100,000 to construct a national war memorial, but what form it should take was vehemently contested. A local jeweller, P. N. Denton believed that a carillon, its bells dedicated to the Fallen, would be an appropriate memorial. Despite the government's reluctance, a group of Wellington residents formed the Wellington War Memorial Carillon Society in 1926, with the aim of raising money by public subscription for its bells. A portion of funds were set aside for Watkins to travel to Belgium, to study carillon with one of its foremost exponents, Jef Denyn. In 1929, Watkins travelled to Malines (Mechelen) in Belgium to study with Denyn, the founder of the Royal Carillon School. She achieved her diploma in 18 months, the first British woman to do so. A report in the Auckland Star noted on 30 July 1930 that "Miss Gladys Watkins of Wellington, the official carillonneur of the New Zealand bells ... has a secured a diploma with distinction at Malines, Belgium." Her progress in Europe was reported in the New Zealand press, as was her subsequent recital tour.

While Watkins was studying for her diploma in Belgium, planning for the construction of the Carillon continued. The bells for the Wellington were the responsibility of the foundry of Gillett & Johnston in Croydon. The finished bells were taken on tour for nine months in Hyde Park, where Watkins gave a demonstration recital on 24 December 1929. The report in the Evening Post recorded that Watkins was "warmly ovationed by large crowds of Christmas shoppers .... The police had to clear the way for Miss Watkins through the mass of appreciative listeners."

== Return to Wellington ==
By December 1930, Watkins was on her way home to New Zealand. She arrived in Wellington in late 1930 or early 1931, and on 21 January 1931 was a guest at the Pioneer Club. During the reception, Watkins gave a talk about her experiences in Belgium, the history of carillon music in Europe and England, and the construction and tuning of carillon bells. In Watkins's view, according to the report, carillon music was unequalled 'as an expression of patriotism, loyalty, and fine sentiment ... it touched the hearts of the people in a way that nothing else in the way of music could do.'

== Consecration of the War Memorial Carillon ==
On Anzac Day, 25 April 1932, Watkins participated in the Consecration Ceremony of the National War Memorial and War Memorial Carillon, alongside her London colleague, Clifford E. Ball. While Ball played several hymns and pieces during the main ceremony that began at 2.30 p.m., Watkins performed during the recital that took place at 7.30 p.m.

== Later career ==
Until Gladys Watkins retired from her role as Wellington's carillonneur in 1936, as a result of poor health, she had performed more than 300 recitals on the instrument. Her repertoire included a variety of transcriptions and original compositions. According to the Evening Post, a recital on 29 May 1932 included several hymns (At Even 'ere the Sun was Set, and Eternal Father, Strong to Save), and her own Prelude on the Scale of C.

Gladys Watkins died on 31 October 1939, at her home in Kelburn, Wellington.

At 3:00 p.m. on 5 November 1939, a recital in honour of Gladys Watkins was given by 'automatic player' on the National War Memorial Carillon. The programme consisted only of works or arrangements by Watkins herself:

Changes on Eight Bells; I Waited for the Lord; My True Love Hath My Heart; Bells of St Mary's; Nearer My God to Thee; The Bells of Scotland - Men of Harlech - Vicar of Bray; The Last Rose of SummerSilver Threads Among the Gold; Oh God Our Help in Ages Past; God Defend New Zealand; The National Anthem.

== See also ==
- Nora Johnston – English carillonneur and inventor (1886–1952)
