= Lesbian Nation (organisation) =

Dutch lesbian-feminist activist group

Lesbian Nation was a Dutch lesbian feminist activist group, operating from 1976 until the mid 80s. The group was instrumental in the establishment of various cultural institutions in the Netherlands.

Lesbian Nation was formed in 1976 out of a consciousness raising group meeting in the feminist squat 'Vrouwenhuis' (women's house) in Amsterdam. It consisted of a core group of fifteen to twenty women. Counting later sympathisers, the loosely organised Lesbian Nation may have grown to between fifty and a hundred members. Lesbian Nation disbanded in the mid 80s as members got increasingly absorbed by other things, like careers and families, and also felt that their efforts had paid off.

== Influences ==
The organisation was inspired by Jill Johnston's book Lesbian Nation, from which they got their name and a desire for lesbian separatism. Ideologically however, Lesbian Nation was influenced more by Monique Wittig and by Adrienne Rich's "Compulsory Heterosexuality and Lesbian Existence". Wittig and Rich made lesbian women, which the collective consisted of, feel slightly superior to other feminists and they led the group on a quest to find a specific lesbian identity and to partially construct a lesbian subculture. This made Lesbian Nation turn inward and, for the duration of their activities, intentionally illusive to the outside world. Members searched for lesbian identity in lengthy discussions on lesbian weekends, through international lesbian contacts and a visit to the Danish feminist women's camp Femølejren. Together with Monique Wittig, with whom they were acquainted, Lesbian Nation dreamt of establishing a womyn's land on an island, where only women would live and work. For mostly personal and practical reasons they failed to achieve it, but the idea of separatism was inspirational in creating a number of cultural establishments.

== Activism and culture ==
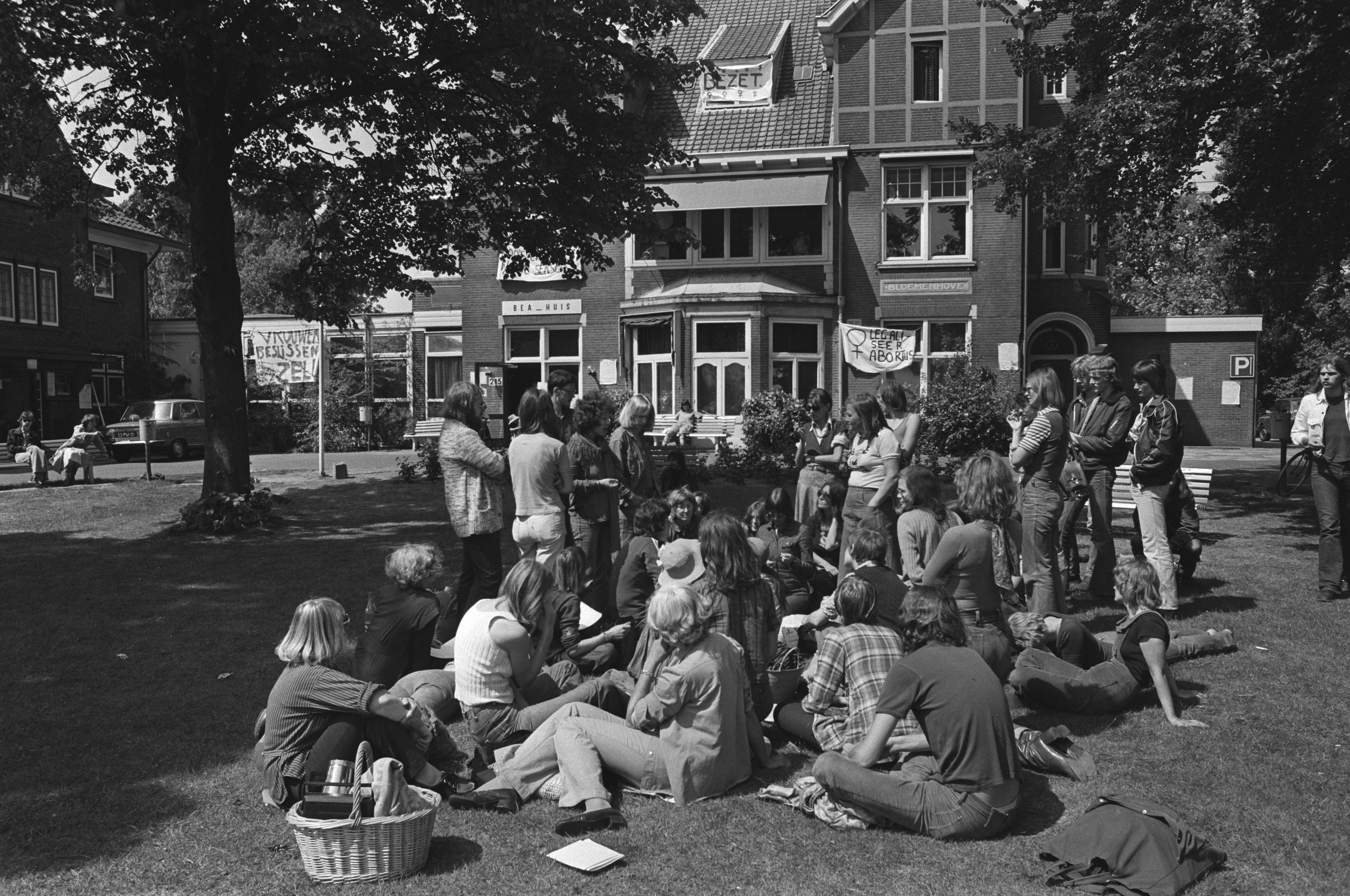
Protesters in front of the Bloemenhove clinic

In 1976 members of Lesbian Nation took part in the occupation of the 'Bloemenhove' abortion clinic, after the Justice minister had threatened it with closure. A year later the group, in cooperation with Maaike Meijer, organised the first large gay march in the Netherlands, in an international protest against the activities of Anita Bryant in the US. This event was repeated in later years and eventually grew into the Dutch gay pride.

To avoid unwanted attention the group arranged the march under the name International Lesbian Alliance, out of the male-dominated COC-office. It probably never cooperated with gay men ever after. They easily formed alliances with other (heterosexual) feminists though, and teamed up with some of those to set up a number of cultural establishments. Among these were a women's bar in Amsterdam (Saarein), a publisher (Virginia), the ethical bank Mama Cash, a women's bookstore (Xantippe), and two Dutch lesbian magazines, Diva and Lust en Gratie. In 1979 Lesbian Nation helped create the Lesbisch Prachtboek (Lesbian Splendour Book), containing articles, interviews, poems and a photo comic. It was called an example of the group's "lesbian cultural guerilla", and fits in the identity finding that Lesbian Nation practised.
