= Marjan Sax =

Dutch feminist lesbian activist

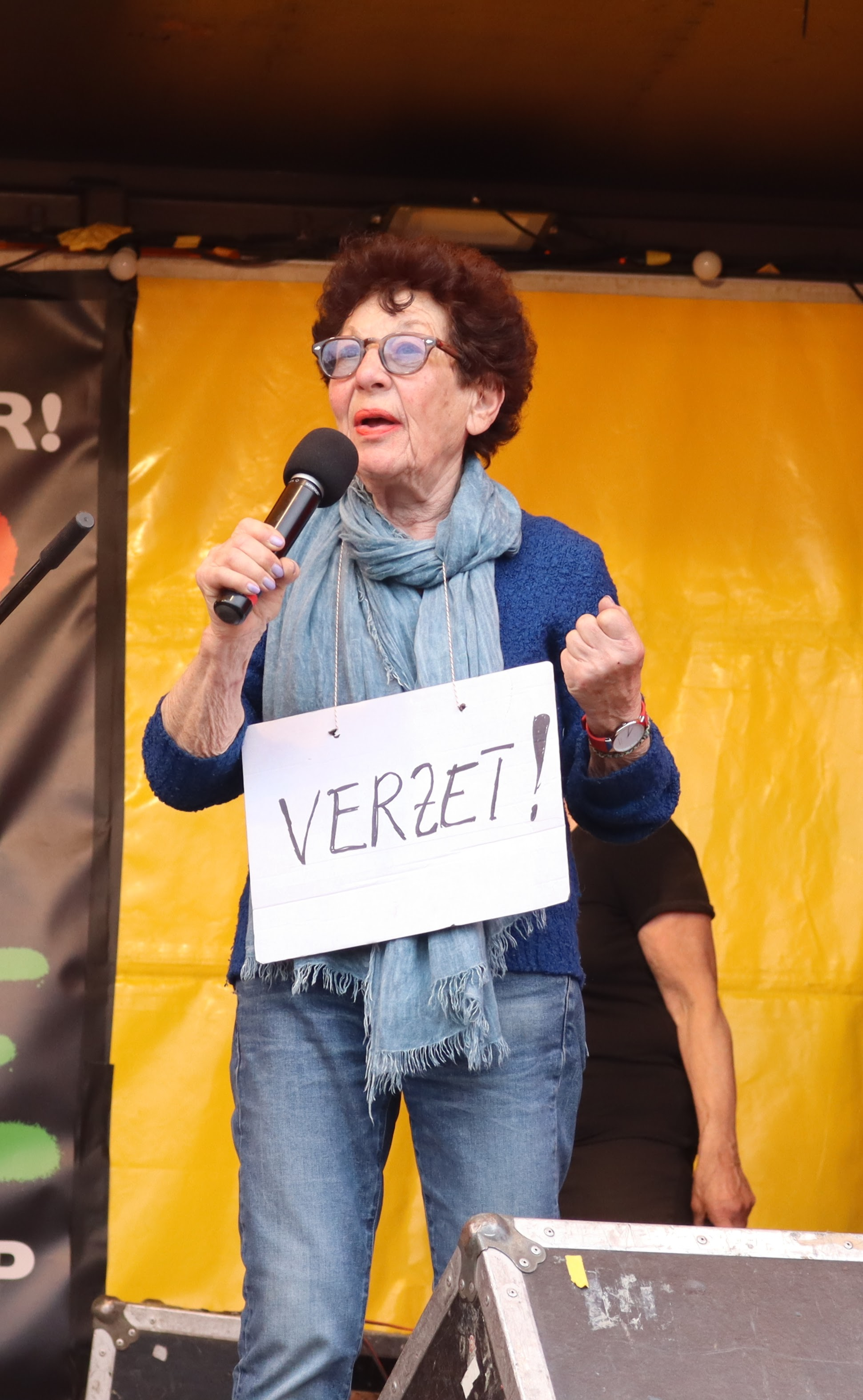
- Sax speaking at the National Demonstration against Racism and Fascism 2025 with a placard that says "Resist!"
- Born: December 26, 1947 (age 78); Amsterdam, the Netherlands

Marjan Sax (born 26 December 1947) is a Dutch feminist lesbian activist, member of Dolle Mina and co-founder of a number of feminist organisations, ethical bank Mama Cash among them. Sax is also an advisor for charity organisations.

== Life ==
Sax was born in Amsterdam and studied politics at the University of Amsterdam. She was teamleader at the Open School in the North of Amsterdam from April 1977 to 1981. After that she worked as a researcher at the Foundation Vrouw & Media from March 1983 until June 1986, where she studied the position of female journalists at Dutch newspaper publishers. Sax has worked as an independent advisor for charities since 2003. She is a writer and is a board member for several organisations. In 2003 Sax read the Mosse Lecture, titled Naar een nieuwe seksuele revolutie (Towards a new sexual revolution).

== Activism ==
Sax was active in Dolle Mina and was the co-founder of various feminist organisations: the Vrouwenhuis in Amsterdam in 1973, the abortion-rights advocacy group Wij Vrouwen Eisen in 1974, the department of Female Studies at the University of Amsterdam and the women's bar Saarein in 1978 where Dutch lesbian-feminist collective Lesbian Nation organised events (mother-daughter days, poetry nights, folk song days, themed parties, etc.). And the Lesbian Archive Amsterdam (now IHLIA LGBT Heritage) in 1982. Sax also took part in several other lesbian and feminist activities. She was one of the occupiers of the abortion clinic Bloemenhove in Heemstede, when it was threatened with closure in 1976. This action played a role in the legalisation of abortion. Sax kept a diary of this occupation, which was published in De Groene Amsterdammer.

In 1982 Sax co-founded the organisation Mama Cash with four others, and she was member of the board until 2003. Organisation Mama Cash has different funds for women projects that promote emancipation and feminism. Sax received a noteworthy heritage and in 1982 she gave Mama Cash an interest-free loan of 2,5 million guilders. The organisation was allowed to keep the profit. In the eighties and nineties Sax was involved in de Roze Draad (1985 - 1991, the feminist supportgroup of De Rode Draad, an organisation for the improvement of the position of sex workers) and Vrouwen tegen Uitzetting (a collaboration to support female refugees).

The archive of Marjan Sax is being kept in Internationaal Archief voor de Vrouwenbeweging (IAV).

== Rewards ==
Sax has received different rewards for her efforts for the Dutch women's rights movement, like the 'Zilveren Anjer' of the Prins Bernhard Cultuurfonds in 1995 and the 'Bob Angelo Penning' of the COC in 1997.
