= Jo Haazen =

Flemish carillonneur (born 1944)

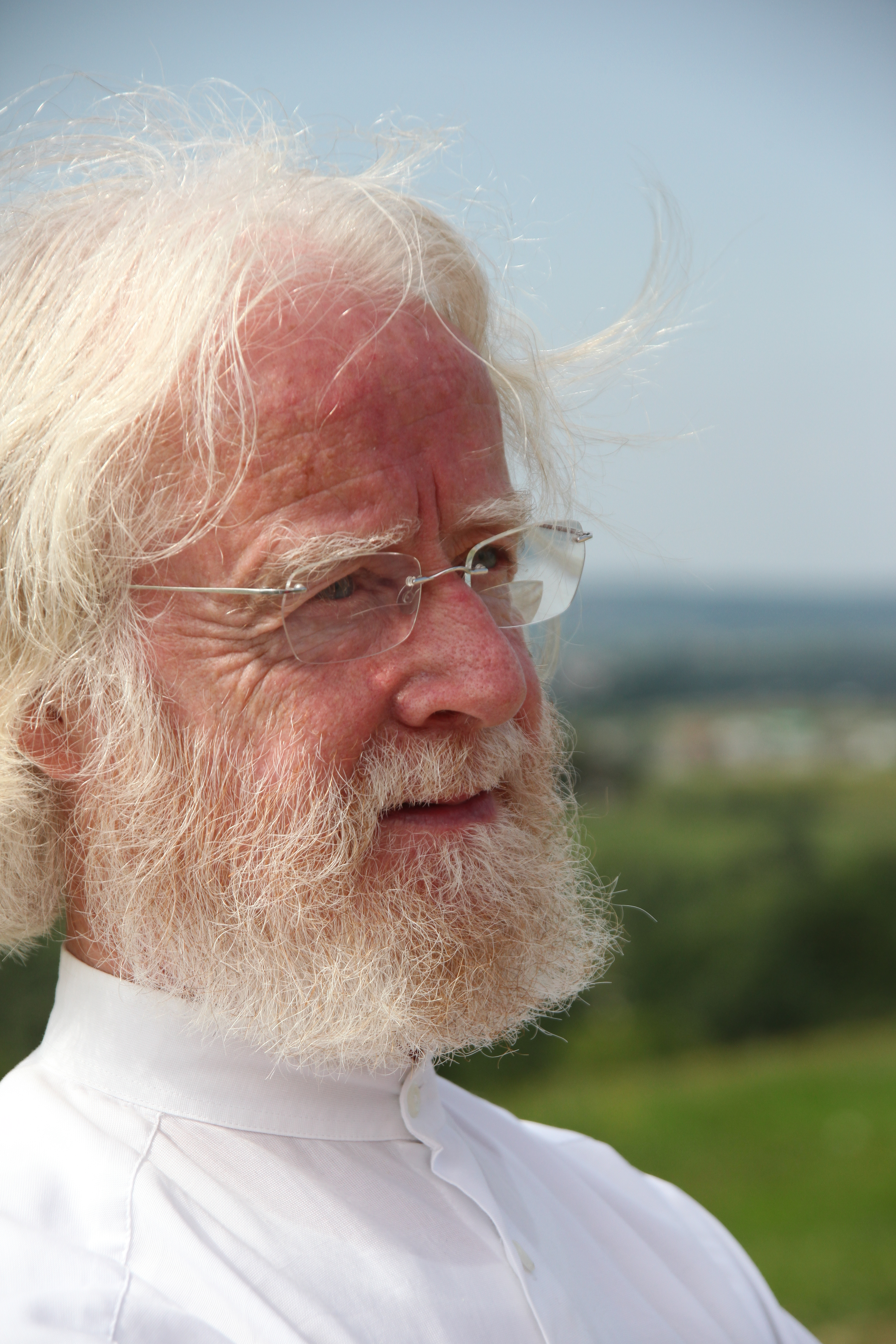
- Haazen in 2013
- Born: Jozef Willem Haazen; 24 December 1944 (age 80)
- Occupation: Carillonneur

Jozef Willem Haazen (born 24 December 1944) is a Flemish musician and carillonneur.

== Education ==
Haazen studied at the Royal Conservatoire Antwerp in Antwerp and the Royal Carillon School "Jef Denyn" in Mechelen, Belgium. He has also studied the language Esperanto.

== Career ==
In 1968, Haazen became the city carillonneur of Antwerp. In 1981, he resigned to become the city carillonneur of Mechelen and the director of the Royal Carillon School "Jef Denyn", following the previous director's retirement. During his tenure, he oversaw the creation of the Queen Fabiola Competition Haazen remained the director until 2010. In 2001, Haazen became the carillonneur of the new carillon at Saints Peter and Paul Cathedral, Saint Petersburg, Russia.

=== Esperanto ===
With the Universal Esperanto Association, Haazen worked on an international project to modify the Universal Declaration of Human Rights to define and include "human obligations".

== Awards ==
- In 1987, Haazen was awarded the Berkeley Medal for Distinguished Service to the Carillon.
- In 1993, Haazen was awarded permanent, honorary membership at The Guild of Carillonneurs in North America. The organization sought to recognize him for his achievement as the director of the Royal Carillon School "Jef Denyn" on his 12th anniversary.
- In 2015, Haazen was awarded the Gaston Feremansprize by the Flemish Cultural Association "Marnixring" (Mechelen, Belgium).
