= Lesbian Nation =

1973 book by Jill Johnson

Lesbian Nation: The Feminist Solution
- Author: Jill Johnston
- Language: English
- Subject: Lesbian feminism; separatist feminism
- Publisher: Simon & Schuster
- Publication date: 1973
- Publication place: United States
- Media type: Print
- Pages: 283
- ISBN: 0-671-21433-0
- OCLC: 627573

Lesbian Nation: The Feminist Solution is a 1973 book by the radical lesbian feminist author and cultural critic Jill Johnston. Originally, Johnston published the work as a series of essays in The Village Voice from 1969 to 1972. In 1973, Lesbian Nation: The Feminist Solution was released as a book, and is considered the manifesto of the lesbian separatist movement.

== Thesis ==
In the book Johnston outlines her vision of radical lesbian feminism. She argues in favor of lesbian separatism, since she believes lesbianism is the only true position for radical feminism. Johnston writes that women should make a total break from men and male-dominated capitalist institutions. In an interview with The Lesbian Tide, she said that lesbians are already forming the society from Lesbian Nation, they just don't realize it because they are living it. Johnston also wrote that female heterosexuality was a form of collaboration with patriarchy. In fact, Johnston herself has said that a key message of the book is all women are lesbians. Writing in the Gay & Lesbian Review in 2007, Johnston summarized her views:

Once I understood the feminist doctrines, a lesbian separatist position seemed the commonsensical position, especially since, conveniently, I was an L-person. Women wanted to remove their support from men, the "enemy" in a movement for reform, power and self-determination.

== Reception ==
The book inspired other lesbian feminist groups. For example, a group of lesbian feminists in Amsterdam named themselves Lesbian Nation in 1976. They chose this name as a nod to Johnston's book. But not all lesbians liked Johnston's work. Writing in The Chicago Tribune, Jane Howard reviewed Lesbian Nation. She wished that Johnston would've taken a more analytical approach than her typical avant-garde one. That way, there would be more concrete answers in the book than just the theorizing Johnston published. Scholars have explained that a commitment to separatism means there is a lack of intersectional analysis, which leads to a focus on the concerns of white women alone. Even with the debates over Lesbian Nation, readers can understand that the criteria for such a society was contested throughout the 70s. Some lesbians would not like Johnston's criteria whereas others would. For instance, in Lavender Woman, Susan Edwards reviewed the book and explained that she felt a "deep seated identification with Jill Johnston."

22 years after Lesbian Nation's publishing, Becki L. Ross wrote the book The House That Jill Built: A Lesbian Nation in Formation, which analyzes the history of the lesbian feminist movement.
