= Ignatius Croon =

Flemish Baroque painter

Ignatius Croon (name variations: Ignaz Cronò, Ignaz Croon and nickname: Gaudtvinck or Goudtvinck (meaning 'bullfinch') (1639–1667) was a Flemish Baroque painter who after training in Mechelen moved to Rome where he died at a young age.

== Life ==
He was born in Mechelen, the son of the notary Peter Croon and brother of Peter Croon (1634–1682), a canon and devotional writer. He was a pupil of the prominent painter Peter Franchoys in Mechelen around 1650. He possibly left for Rome immediately after completing his training in 1657.

In Rome he lived at the home of Pieter Mulier the Younger, a Dutch marine painter, in the parish of the Santa Maria del Popolo. He became a member of the Bentvueghels, an association of mainly Dutch and Flemish artists working in Rome. It was customary for the Bentvueghels to adopt an appealing nickname, the so-called 'bent name'. Ignatius Croon was given the bent name Gaudtvinck (also written as Goudtvinck), which means 'bullfinch'. His name appears in one of the niches of the Santa Costanza, the Roman church where the Bentvueghels used to congregate. The following words are written in red chalk: ‘ignativs croon/alias gavdtvinck.’

He died in Rome at the age of 28.

== Work ==
No known works by his hand are known. A portrait of his brother Peter Croon, now in the Municipal Museum of Mechelen, is attributed to him.
