= Adèle Colson =

Belgian carillonneur (1905–1997)

Adèle Celestine Josephina Colson (24 February 1905 – 22 December 1997) was the first woman to graduate from the Royal Carillon School "Jef Denyn" in Mechelen, Belgium, and the first woman in the world to earn a professional carillon certification.

== Life and career ==
Colson was born in Mechelen, Belgium, and studied voice and piano at the Mechelen Conservatory. In 1924 she enrolled at the Royal Carillon School. Staf Nees refused to teach her because he believed the carillon should not be played by women. As a result, she was taught by the director Jef Denyn himself.

Colson earned her carillon diploma on August 10, 1929, performing a range of repertoire including Jef van Hoof's Praeludium quasi una fantasia, an original piece she composed, and Matthias Vanden Gheyn's third carillon prelude. Due to gender discrimination, she was never able to find ongoing employment as a carillonist and famously tore up her diploma. In the 1970s, Royal Carillon School director Piet van den Broek reissued her diploma that is now preserved in the Anton Brees Carillon Library.
