= Sally Slade Warner =

American carillonneur and organist (1932–2009)

Sally Slade Warner (September 6, 1932 – December 4, 2009) was a leading American carillonneur, carillon composer and arranger, and a church organist. She played the carillon at St. Stephen's Episcopal Church in Cohasset, Massachusetts, and the former carillon at Phillips Academy in Andover, Massachusetts.

== Life and career ==
Warner majored in organ performance at the New England Conservatory of Music. She commenced carillon studies with Earl A. Chamberlain at St. Stephen's Episcopal Church in Cohasset, Massachusetts, then earned a diploma in 1979 from the Royal Carillon School "Jef Denyn" in Belgium studying with Piet van den Broek. She also pursued lessons with Milford Myhre at Bok Tower Gardens and passed the examination of The Guild of Carillonneurs in North America (GCNA) in 1980. She became an active member of that organization and of the World Carillon Federation.

In 1985, Warner succeeded Earl Chamberlain as carillonneur of St. Stephen's Episcopal Church, and also served for years as carillonneur, associate faculty member, and music librarian at Phillips Academy.

In 1988, Warner was awarded the Berkeley Medal from the University of California, Berkeley, for distinguished service to the carillon. She was also recognized by the GCNA as an honorary member. Her papers are preserved in the GCNA Heritage Music Collection. In 2019, the GCNA established a Sally Slade Warner Arrangements & Transcriptions Competition in her honor.

== Selected musical works ==
- Hymn Settings for Carillon, Set 3, GCNA (1995)
- Passacaglia on E-A-C, American Carillon Music Editions (1998)
- Variations for carillon on the song Die alder soetste Jesus (The most beloved Jesus), GCNA (2005)
