= International Network of Women's Funds =

Membership organisation bringing together women's funds from around the world

The International Network of Women's Funds (INWF) is a membership organisation bringing together women's funds from around the world, in order to promote "philanthropy with a feminist perspective". INWF was founded in 2000 with nine members, including the oldest international women's funds Mama Cash and the Global Fund for Women, and in 2014, had 42 members globally. From 2010, the Executive Director has been Emilienne de León (also known as Emilienne de León Aulina).

Some the members distribute substantial amounts of money. For example, according to its annual report, Mama Cash allocated 15.7m Euro (approx $16m) in 2022. According to its website, the Fondo Centroamericano de Mujeres (FCAM) based in Central America 'has awarded 2,568 grants with a total value of 32 million U.S. dollars to more than 600 organisations and activists in Central America'.

== History ==
In 1999, the Global Fund for Women and Mama Cash brought together six women's funds from around the world for a brainstorming session. In 2000, the first meeting of INWF was held, with nine members. According to Shirley Waters, founder and chair of the Women's Hope and Education and Training Trust, "these international women's funds provide[d] an easily identifiable way to support the work of women's groups in other countries." Similarly, while discussing women's funds and the history of the INWF in 2013, Musimbi Kanyoro (CEO of the Global Fund for Women) said, "Organized philanthropy can make a difference if the funding is targeted towards addressing the root causes of women’s vulnerability."
