= Luc Rombouts =

Belgian carillonneur and author (born 1962)

Luc Rombouts (born 1962) is a Belgian carillonneur and author. He is the city carillonneur of Tienen in Flemish Brabant. He is also the official carillonneur of both Leuven University carillons (one in the university library, the other in the Groot Begijnhof) and the Park Abbey. He has given numerous concerts in Europe and the US and appeared in festivals and conventions. Together with Twan Bearda he performs in a carillon duet called The Bells' Angels, exploring, expanding and performing four hand carillon repertoire.

== Publications ==
In 2010, Luc Rombouts published a reference book on the origins and development of the art of carillon playing, (Zingend brons. Vijf eeuwen beiaardmuziek in de Lage Landen en de Nieuwe Wereld, Leuven, 2010 ) for which he was awarded the Golden Label from Klassiek Centraal and the Visser-Neerlandia Prize in 2011 from the Algemeen Nederlands Verbond for his cultural achievements. In 2014, Rombouts published the English translation of this book under the title Singing Bronze (Leuven University Press).

=== Books ===
- ——— (1987). Economische analyse van het verschijnsel beiaard [Economic Analysis of the Carillon Phenomenon] (in Dutch). Royal Carillon School "Jef Denyn". OCLC 1194478897.
- ——— (1990). Het Liedeken van de Lovenaers: een 18de-eeuws Leuvens beiaardhandschrift: facsimile-uitgave [The Liedeken van de Lovenaers: An 18th-century Leuven Carillon Manuscript: Facsimile Edition] (in Dutch). Leuven University Press. ISBN 978-90-6186-398-4. OCLC 906576388.
- ———, ed. (2000). Proceedings of the 11th World Carillon Congress: August 9-13, 1998. Vlaamse Beiaard Vereniging. OCLC 826612900.
- ———; Beyen, Marnix & Vos, Staf (2009). De beiaard: een politieke geschiedenis [The Carillon: A Political History] (in Dutch). Leuven University Press. ISBN 978-90-5867-753-2. OCLC 1076703399.
- ——— (2010). Zingend brons: 500 jaar beiaardmuziek in de Lage Landen en de Nieuwe Wereld [Singing Bronze: 500 Years of Carillon Music in the Low Countries and the New World] (in Dutch). Davidsfonds/Clauwaert V.Z.W. ISBN 978-90-5826-720-7. OCLC 642215104.
- ——— & Proot, David (2014). Broken Bells of Flanders. Provincieraad van West-Vlaanderen. OCLC 901522297.
- ——— (2014). Singing Bronze: A History of Carillon Music. Translated by Communicationwise. Leuven University Press. ISBN 978-90-5867-956-7. OCLC 1019908277.
- ——— & Dill, Andreas (2014). Singing Towers: Flemish Carillons in Pictures. Davidsfonds Uitgeverij. ISBN 978-90-5908-876-4. OCLC 1141119780.
- ———; van der Jeught, Fr & van den Eijnden, Mark (2015). De wereld van Jef Rottiers rondom de Tuin der Lusten: catalogus [The World of Jef Rottiers around the Garden of Delights: Catalog] (in Dutch). Klok & Peel Museum Asten. ISBN 978-90-807553-0-7. OCLC 943069801.
- ——— & Dill, Andreas (2017). Zingende torens: Vlaamse beiaarden in beeld [Singing Towers: Flemish Carillons in Pictures] (in Dutch). Davidsfonds Uitgeverij. ISBN 978-90-5908-876-4. OCLC 982971654.
- ——— (2018). Inhuldiging van de vredesbeiaard in Abdij van Park, 11 november 2018 [Inauguration of the Peace Carillon in Park Abbey, 11 November 2018] (in Dutch). City of Leuven. OCLC 1194448327.
- ——— (2019). De Vredesbeiaard van de Abdij van Park: Zoektocht naar verloren klank [The Peace Carillon of Park Abbey: A Search for Lost Sound] (in Dutch). Uitgeverij Averbode. ISBN 978-2-8081-0290-2.
- ——— (2019). De oorsprong van de beiaard: voorlopers, ontstaan en ontwikkeling tot 1530 [The Origin of the Carillon: Precursors, Origin and Development until 1530] (in Dutch). SKRIBIS. ISBN 978-94-92944-81-8. OCLC 1198093715.
- ———; Saelemaekers, Guy; Teugels, Jef; Caes, Ward & van der Jeught, François (2020). Welluidend erfgoed: het klokkenpatrimonium van het land aan Demer en Dijle [Well-Sounding Heritage: the Bell Patrimony of the Country at Demer and Dijle] (in Dutch). HAGOK. ISBN 978-94-92771-37-7. OCLC 1194516941.
- ——— (n.d.). Mechelen, hoofdstad van de beiaard: gids voor een beiaardwandeling door Mechelen [Mechelen, Capital of the Carillon: Guide for a Carillon Walk through Mechelen] (in Dutch). G. Ardies. OCLC 1194466045.

=== Theses ===
- ——— (1968). Gelijkstroomonderbreking bij een elektro magnetische relais [Direct Current Interruption in an Electromagnetic Relay] (Thesis) (in Dutch). KIHA. OCLC 901624229.
- ——— (2016). De oorsprong van de beiaard: wortels, ontstaan en ontwikkeling tot 1530 [The Origin of the Carillon: Roots, Origin and Development up to 1530] (Thesis) (in Dutch). Luc Rombouts. OCLC 986519327.

=== Articles ===
- ——— & Huybens, Gilbert (1998). "De beiaardpreludia van Matthias Vanden Gheyn" [The Carillon Preludes of Matthias Vanden Gheyn]. Musica Antiqua: Actuele Informatie over Oude Muziek (in Dutch). 15 (2). Musica, Vlaams Centrum voor Oude Muziek: 55–58. OCLC 1113026111.
- ——— (2012). "Jef Denyn: een man van zijn tijd" [Jef Denyn: A Man of His Time]. VBV-magazine (in Dutch). No. 18. Vlaamse Beiaard Vereniging. pp. 2–13. OCLC 902113552.
- ——— (20 January 2001). "Carillon". Oxford Music Online. Oxford University Press. doi:10.1093/gmo/9781561592630.article.04929.
- ——— (20 January 2001). "Vanden Gheyn". Oxford Music Online. Oxford University Press. doi:10.1093/gmo/9781561592630.article.28985.
