= Fondo Centroamericano de Mujeres =

Feminist organisation supporting women's rights

- Abbreviation: FCAM
- Formation: 2003
- Location: Managua
- Coordinates: 12.137611°N 86.28675°W
- Region served: Nicaragua
- Website: www.fcmujeres.org

The Fondo Centroamericano de Mujeres (FCAM) or Central American Women's Fund is a feminist organisation supporting women's rights in Central America, based in Nicaragua. FCAM is the first and only foundation in Central America, focused on resourcing grassroots women's organisations. As a women's fund, it works towards guaranteeing women's human rights through physical and emotional integrity, economic justice, and political participation. FCAM provides money, capacity building, and opportunities for the defence and promotion of human rights.

== History ==
FCAM was founded in 2003, and registered in Nicaragua in 2006. Its founder and first executive director was Ana Criquillion. From 2009, it has been led by Carla López (currently at February 2024 the Executive Director); also (until at least 2021 but not in 2024) on the board of the umbrella organisation, the International Network of Women’s Funds also known as Prospera, since 2013.

FCAM was set up to gather new sources of funds from individuals in the Central American region and the diaspora in the United States, for redistribution to women's rights organisations, particularly those led by and comprising young underprivileged women.

When FCAM was founded, over 50 percent of the population of Central America (then 20 million people) was living on less than $2 per day. Even more disturbing was the gendered nature of this context: the average per capita income for women was only 50 percent of that of men, illiteracy was higher amongst women than men, maternal mortality rates were growing, and one in four women admitted to being victims of often unreported domestic or sexual violence.

== Achievements ==
In the first six years of its existence, FCAM's annual budget grew from $25,000 to $1.5 million, and the number of grantee partners increased from five in Nicaragua to 140 in six countries.

According to the FCAM website, (March 2024), 'over the past two decades, FCAM has awarded 2,568 grants with a total value of 32 million U.S. dollars to more than 600 organisations and activists in Central America'.

Since its inception, FCAM has worked on empowering marginalised communities of women, in particular the indigenous, the young, lesbian, bisexual and trans women, those living with HIV/AIDS, and sex workers. More recently, FCAM has been linking the issues of climate change and gender justice, finding that environmental destruction is leading to increased violence against women.
