= Monika Kaźmierczak =

- Education: Gdańsk Music Academy (BA, MA, Doctorate)
- Musical career
- Instruments: Carillon; piano

Monika Kaźmierczak is currently the city carillonist of Gdańsk, Poland. She has been the city carillonist since 2001. She was the president of the Polish Carillon Association between 2011 and 2015, and, as of July 2022, is the secretary of the association.

== Education ==
She began her musical studies on piano, then earning a Master's degree studying music theory at the Music Academy in Gdańsk. After becoming city carillonist, she studied at the Netherlands Carillon School, and received a master's degree in 2005. Finally she received a doctorate in Carillon from the Music Academy in Gdańsk in 2012.

== Professional ==
Kaźmierczak plays throughout many countries in Europe, including Lithuania, France, and the Netherlands. She has worked with the Hevelius Brass Quintett, and also plays a mobile carillon. She currently teaches carillon at the Music Academy in Gdańsk, and other subjects at the Elblag State Music School.

Kaźmierczak was the 5th prize winner of the 2008 Queen Fabiola Competition.
