= Sebastiaen van Aken =

Flemish historical painter

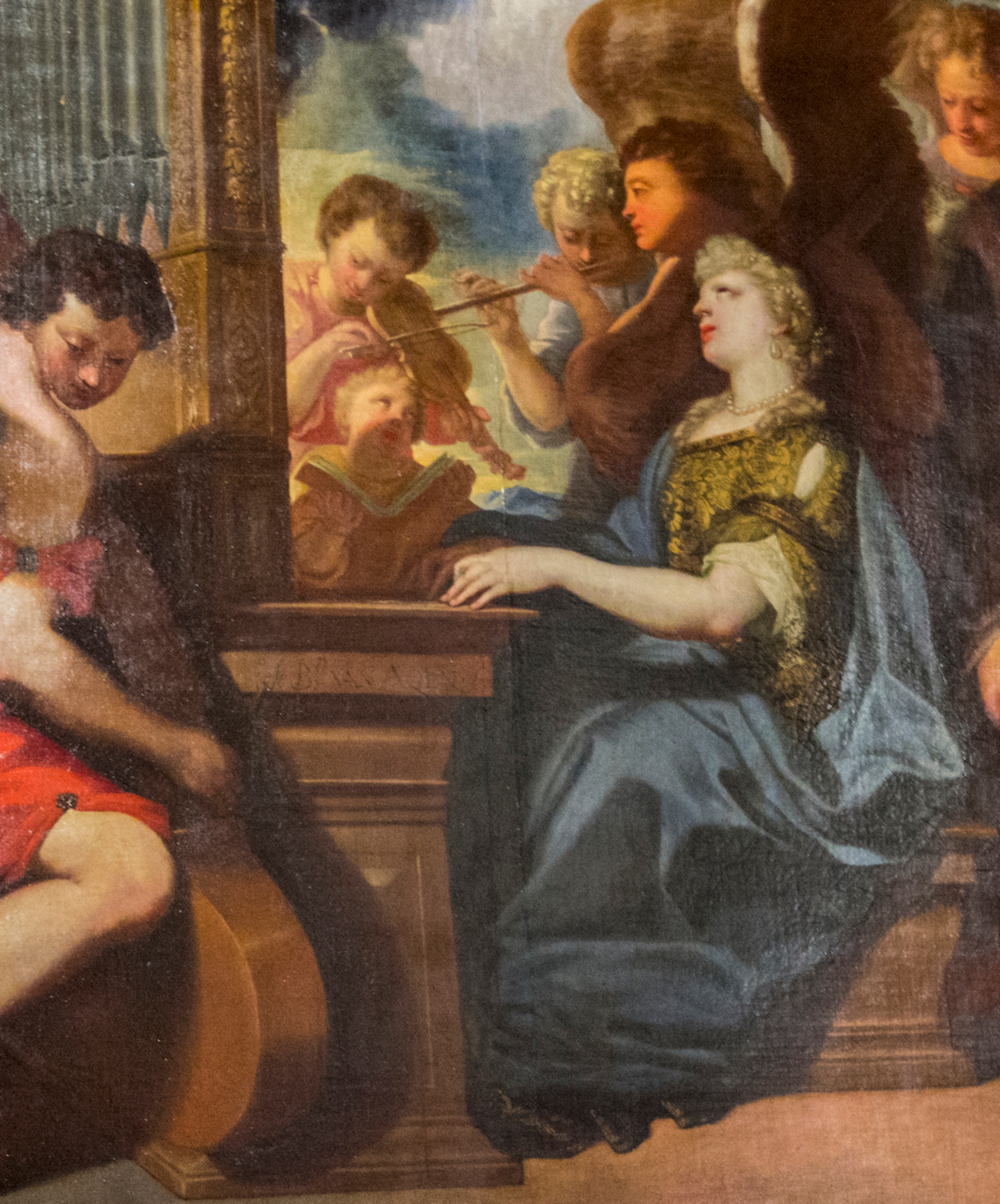
Saint Cecilia at the organ (detail)

Sebastiaen van Aken or Sebastiaen Aken (bapt. 31 March 1648 – 21 November 1722) was a Flemish historical painter.

== Life ==
Aken was born in Mechelen and became a pupil of Lucas Franchoys, the younger. He later went to Rome, where he studied under Carlo Maratti, and visited Spain and Portugal. A painting by him of St. Norbert is in the village church of Duffel, near Mechlin. He died in his home city of Mechelen.
