= Jill Johnston =

American feminist author (1929–2010)

- Johnston in 1985
- Born: Jill Crowe; May 17, 1929; London, England
- Died: September 18, 2010 (aged 81); Hartford, Connecticut, U.S.
- Education: Tufts University; University of North Carolina at Greensboro (MFA)
- Occupations: Author; cultural critic
- Employer: The Village Voice
- Spouses: Richard John Lanham (m. 1958; div. 1964); Ingrid Nyeboe (m. 1993, divorced) (m. 2009)
- Children: 2
- Father: Cyril F. Johnston
- Relatives: Nora Johnston (aunt)
- Writing career
- Pen name: F. J. Crowe
- Notable work: Lesbian Nation (1973)
- Movement: Lesbian feminist activism

Jill Johnston (born Jill Crowe; May 17, 1929 – September 18, 2010) was a British-born American feminist author and cultural critic. She is most famous for her radical lesbian feminism book, Lesbian Nation and was a longtime writer for The Village Voice. She was also a leader of the lesbian separatist movement of the 1970s. Johnston also wrote under the pen name F. J. Crowe.

== Early life and education ==
Jill was born as Jill Crowe in London on May 17, 1929, the only child of Olive Marjorie Crowe, an American nurse, and Cyril F. Johnston, an English bellfounder and clockmaker whose family firm, Gillett & Johnston, created the carillon of Riverside Church in New York City. (Note: The birth name of "Jill Crowe" is given on the 16 October 1929 passenger manifest of the RMS Homeric, accessed on ancestry.com. The manifest states that Jill Crowe was travelling with her mother, Olive Crowe, a nurse.) Her aunt was inventor Nora Johnston. After her father abandoned them, her mother took Jill to Little Neck, Queens, New York, where she was raised by a grandmother.

Throughout her childhood, she believed that her parents had divorced. After her father's death she knew that her parents were never married through an obituary in the New York Times. Her fascination for her absent father later motivated her to write, England's Child: The Carillon and the Casting of Big Bells. It was a biography of her father as well as a history of bell making.

Johnston received her bachelor's degree from Tufts University in 1951. While studying dance at the University of North Carolina at Greensboro, she began writing for the Dance Observer.

== Career ==
In the mid-1950s, Johnston moved to New York City to study dance under Jose Limón, but turned to writing after she broke her foot. Beginning in 1959, Johnston served as the dance critic for The Village Voice, the weekly downtown newspaper for New York City. She was friendly with many performers, performance artists, composers, poets and artists associated with the Judson Dance Theater, and championed postmodern movements like Fluxus and artists like Yvonne Rainier, Robert Morris, Merce Cunningham, and Lucinda Childs. During the late 1960s, Deborah Jowitt joined the paper and wrote a regular dance column for the Voice, while Johnston's dance column became a kind of weekly diary, chronicling her adventures in the New York art world. She became involved with gay and feminist activism in 1969, when Lois Hart and Suzanne Bevier encouraged her to contribute to Come Out!, the newsletter for the Gay Liberation Front.

Johnston was a member of a 1971 New York City panel produced by Shirley Broughton as part of the "Theater for Ideas" series. The event was a vigorous debate on feminism with Norman Mailer, author; Germaine Greer, author; Diana Trilling, literary critic; Jacqueline Ceballos, National Organization for Women president, and Johnston herself. The event was also billed as an intellectual "Battle of the Sexes" – effectively promoting Mailer's then-just-published, feminism-critical book The Prisoner of Sex (1971). When the time came for her to make her introductory remarks, Johnston read a poem, after which two feminist friends came onstage and the three simulated (fully dressed) three-way lesbian sex (indulging in a bit of feminist Guerilla theatre, which she admitted she had learned from the Yippies) and quickly exited. Despite this colorful interruption, Greer and Mailer continued to exchange verbal blows with each other (and the audience) for the remainder of the 3½ hour event. This event was widely written about (since so many writers were in attendance, including Susan Sontag and Cynthia Ozick) and filmed by the now-legendary documentary filmmaker D. A. Pennebaker, eventually becoming the cult-documentary titled Town Bloody Hall.

As this incident illustrates, Johnston's self-described "east west flower child beat hip psychedelic paradise now love peace do your own thing approach to the revolution" (as she called it in Lesbian Nation) often confounded her feminist allies as much as it did the conservative foes of gay and lesbian liberation. As recorded in Lesbian Nation, Johnston often was at the center of controversies within the feminist movement of the 1960s and 1970s. She famously went on record stating that "all women are lesbians except those that don't know it yet." Lesbian Nation, published in 1972, was written in a Dadaist narrative and called for lesbian separatism, something that Johnston viewed not just as a physical entity, but a mental endeavor. She frequently hosted "lesbian camp weekends" at her country house in upstate New York; one regular visitor was architect Phyllis Birkby, who she had met at the Women's College of North Carolina. Birkby and Johnston collaborated on the anthology Amazon Expedition, and contemplated purchasing land for a lesbian living space together in the Berkshires.

In her work Films Out of Focus, specifically in the 1972 edition, Johnston presents enigmatic phrases that captivate the reader's attention, encouraging introspection. Her writing includes discussions about feminism, particularly the assertion that lesbians are feminists, not solely defined by their sexuality. In 1973, she predicted "an end to the catastrophic brotherhood and a return to the former glory and wise equanimity of the matriarchies."

Johnston was also one of the first countercultural and lesbian writers at Ms. magazine, eventually coming to the conclusion that the magazine was too mainstream, ultimately presenting feminism as palatable, family-friendly and safe. According to author Vivian Gornick:

For radical feminists like me, Ellen Willis, and Jill Johnston, we had a different kind of magazine in mind. We came out against marriage and motherhood. Gloria Steinem was uptown; we were downtown. She hung out with Establishment figures; we had only ourselves. It very quickly became obvious at that first meeting that they wanted a glossy that would appeal to the women who read the Ladies' Home Journal. We didn't want that, so they walked away with it.

On another occasion, Johnston grew bored at a poolside press conference given by feminist Betty Friedan, and so decided to strip off her top and take a swim.

In 1977, Johnson became an associate of the Women's Institute for Freedom of the Press (WIFP). WIFP is an American nonprofit publishing organization. The organization works to increase communication between women and connect the public with forms of women-based media.

Johnston's career as a dance critic was hampered by the controversy that attended the publication of Lesbian Nation and the publicity engendered by her dramatic style of lesbian feminist activism. She remained with The Village Voice until 1981 and subsequently wrote freelance art and literary criticism. Along with the political memoirs, Lesbian Nation and Gullible's Travels, Johnston published an anthology of dance criticism entitled Marmalade Me as well as the autobiographies Mother Bound and Paper Daughter.

Described by one critic as "part Gertrude Stein, part E. E. Cummings, with a dash of Jack Kerouac thrown for good measure," Johnston's freeform, fluid writing style of the 1970s matched the colorful nature of the tales recounted in her books Lesbian Nation and Gullibles Travels. Her later work as a literary and art critic for Art in America and the New York Times Review of Books is more standard in tone and content. Early writing not collected in other volumes can be found in Admission Accomplished while the critical biography Jasper Johns represents an example of her later style.

Johnston is the subject of one of Andy Warhol's portrait films, Jill, a 4½-minute silent movie shot in black and white (1963). She also performed in John Cage's Music Walk in 1962, and Karlheinz Stockhausen's Jill Johnston Dancing.

== Personal life ==
In 1958, Johnston married Richard John Lanham, whom she divorced in 1964. They had two children, a son, Richard Renault Lanham, and a daughter, Winifred Brooke Lanham.

In 1993, she married Ingrid Nyeboe in Denmark in a Fluxus performance featuring Geoffrey Hendricks. The couple married again, in Connecticut, in 2009.

== Death ==
On September 10, 2010, Johnston suffered a stroke in Hartford, Connecticut. She died eight days later, on September 18, 2010, at the age of 81.

== Bibliography ==
- Marmalade Me (1971; revised 1998) – an anthology of short pieces on dance reprinted from Village Voice
- Lesbian Nation: The Feminist Solution (1973)
- Gullibles Travels (1974)
- Mother Bound (1983) – autobiographical
- Paper Daughter (1985) – autobiographical
- Secret Lives in Art (1994) – selected essays on literature, visual and performing arts
- Jasper Johns (1996) – critical biography of the artist
- Admission Accomplished: the Lesbian Nation years (1970–75) (1998) – anthology of earlier writing
- At Sea On Land: Extreme Politics (2005) – travel writings, with political commentary on government policies since 9/11
- England's Child: The Carillon and the Casting of Big Bells (2008) – a biography of Johnston's father, Cyril F. Johnston, a prominent English bellfounder and builder of carillons in the first half of the 20th century
