= Philips van der Aa =

Dutch politician

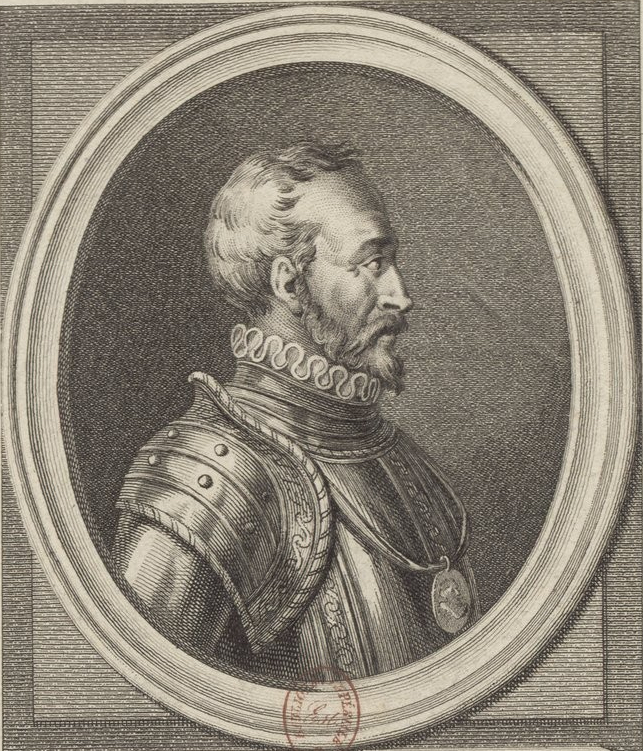

Personal details
- Born: Mechelen
- Died: after 1586
- Occupation: Politician, statesman

Philips van der Aa (died after 1586) was a politician in the Seventeen Provinces and a statesman of the Dutch Republic during its struggle for independence, the Eighty Years' War.

== Biography ==
He was born in Mechelen, and was mayor of the city in 1564, but was banished by the Duke of Alva. He returned on the side of William I, Prince of Orange (William the Silent). In 1572, he came back to power in Mechelen by cunning. In 1573 he was assigned as councillor at the court of Diederik Sonoy, and in 1574 he became commander in Gorkum.

== Sources ==
- Allgemeine Deutsche Biographie - online version at Wikisource
- Nieuw Nederlandsch Biografisch Woordenboek
