= Mama Cash =

International women's fund

- Founded: 1983 (in Amsterdam, Netherlands)
- Founder: Marjan Sax, Dorelies Kraakman, Patti Slegers, Lida van den Broek, Tania Leon
- Location: Amsterdam, Netherlands
- Key people: Zohra Moosa (Executive Director); Nancy Jouwe and Farah Salka (Co-Chairs of the Board)
- Website: www.mamacash.org

Mama Cash is the oldest international women's fund in the world, founded in the Netherlands in 1983. In 2013, Mama Cash supported 118 women's, girls and trans rights organisations with 4.3 million euros.

== History ==
Mama Cash was founded in the Netherlands in 1983 by five feminists: Marjan Sax, Dorelies Kraakman, Patti Slegers, Tania Leon and Lida van den Broek. Marjan Sax provided the initial capital of $1,250,000, lending it to Mama Cash for an initial ten years, later extended by another five years. While initially uncomfortable with her inherited wealth, Sax felt it was important that activism be funded, and that money and ideals go together. Her philosophy inspired other wealthy women, and Mama Cash started a group called De Erfdochters (Women With Inherited Wealth).

In 2000, Mama Cash was one of the nine founding members of the International Network of Women's Funds

The founders of Mama Cash believed that women are best able to achieve structural change in their own context, and that small, autonomous women's groups were critical to achieving this change. However, since most groups at the time needed small grants (mostly less than $10,000), large grantmaking organisations were not equipped to give such small grants or have the expertise to support these grassroots organisations. In the early years, Mama Cash mostly gave start-up money to initiatives that supported women's autonomy over their bodies, including groups that supported sexuality rights, safe abortion and sex workers' rights. One such initiative was a Latina lesbian magazine, Esto no tiene nombre, which was organised and edited by a group of Latina lesbians including tatiana de la tierra, and it was meant to create a platform for discussion and awareness about this underrepresented minority of women.

This philosophy continues to shape Mama Cash's development, with Mama Cash's main initiatives being Body (safety and autonomy of women's bodies), Money (equitable and just economic systems), Voice (women's decision-making), and Women's Funds (the global network of women's funds).

To mark the thirty year anniversary of Mama Cash's existence in 2013, Alliance magazine interviewed Nicky McIntyre, the Executive Director. At the time, McIntyre reflected on the impact of women's rights organisations over the past three decades, saying: "The work of women’s rights movements has led to nothing short of a revolution in public attitudes, law and governance, in the private sector and civil society. While many women’s rights groups are small, their aggregate impact is enormous."
