= Jacqueline Ceballos =

American feminist and activist (born 1925)

Jacqueline Michot Ceballos
- Born: September 8, 1925 (age 100); Mamou, Louisiana, U.S.
- Education: Southwestern Louisiana Institute
- Occupations: Activist, political organizer
- Known for: Founding the Veteran Feminists of America; Representative of National Organization for Women
- Title: President of Veteran Feminists of America
- Spouse: Alvaro Ceballos (m. 1951)
- Children: 4
- Website: www.veteranfeministsofamerica.org

Jacqueline Michot Ceballos (born September 8, 1925) is an American feminist and activist. Ceballos is the former president of New York Chapter of the National Organization for Women and founder of the Veteran Feminists of America organization which documents the history of second-wave feminism and pioneer feminists. Ceballos' 1971 debate on sexual politics with Norman Mailer and Germaine Greer is recorded in the 1979 film Town Bloody Hall. Ceballos is also featured in the feminist history film She's Beautiful When She's Angry.

== Early life ==
Ceballos was born Jacqueline Michot in Mamou, Louisiana, on September 8, 1925. The daughter of Louis Michot and Adele Domas, Ceballos was the middle child of seven children. She attended public school in Lafayette and studied music at Southwestern Louisiana Institute. After majoring in voice, Ceballos moved to New York City to pursue a career in opera.

In 1951 Ceballos married Colombian businessman Alvaro Ceballos with whom she had four children. After the family moved to Bogotá, Colombia, in 1958, Ceballos founded the city's first opera company, El Teatro Experimental de la Opera. During the break-up of her marriage, Ceballos was given Betty Friedan's The Feminine Mystique to read, which she later said inspired her toward activism in the feminist movement. Her husband helped her open an export-import clothing business in New York.

== Activism ==
In 1967, Ceballos moved back to New York City with her four children where she attended her first National Organization for Women (NOW) meeting. She served on the boards of NOW at the national and local levels from 1967–1973 and formed a public relations committee and speakers bureau. She co-founded the New Feminist Theater.

In 1971, Ceballos served as president of New York NOW. She appeared in the April 30, 1971 town hall debate entitled, A Dialogue on Women's Liberation with Norman Mailer, Germaine Greer, Diana Trilling, Jacqueline Ceballos, Jill Johnston. The debate was recorded and released as D. A. Pennebaker's 1979 documentary film Town Bloody Hall. During the debate, Ceballos made a case that women had the right and duty "to have a voice in changing the world that is changing them." Angry about the image of women in media, Ceballos described the advertiser's portrayal as "She gets an orgasm when she gets the shiny floor!"

Ceballos became NOW's Eastern Regional Director in 1971 and served as its representative at the 1972 Democratic National Convention. She co-founded the Women's Forum in 1974 and served as the organization's first executive director. She later worked as a representative at the United Nations International Women's Conference. Along with dozens of other prominent feminists, Ceballos helped found the National Women's Political Caucus. In 1972, she joined the Ms. campaign, "We Have Had Abortions" which called for an end to "archaic laws" limiting reproductive freedom, they encouraged women to share their stories and take action.

In 1970, Ceballos helped Betty Friedan organize the Women's Strike for Equality. She assisted Friedan in organizing demonstrations speaking out against the all-male staff at The New York Times.

Ceballos became an associate of the Women's Institute for Freedom of the Press (WIFP) in 1977. WIFP is an American nonprofit publishing organization. The organization works to increase communication between women and connect the public with forms of women-based media.

In 2014, Ceballos was featured in the film She's Beautiful When She's Angry.

== Veteran Feminists of America ==
In 1975 Ceballos retired from general activism to start a company. Ceballos opened a public relations firm to advertise feminist education courses and she began the New Feminist Talent speaker's bureau. After the rise of anti-feminism during the 1980s, Ceballos with Dorothy Senerchia, Barbara Seaman, and other feminist pioneers founded the Veteran Feminists of America (VFA). The founding principle of the organization was to preserve the history of second-wave feminism as well as to honor the women and men who pioneered the movement.

== Personal life ==
As of 2012, Ceballos lives in Phoenix, Arizona, where her daughter, Michele, founded a non-profit dance and education group. Her husband, Alvaro, died from Alzheimers at the age of 92 in Cucuta, Colombia.

== See also ==
- List of women's rights activists
