= Queen Fabiola Competition =

International music competition for carillon

Queen Fabiola Competition Koningin Fabiolawedstrijd
- Status: Active
- Genre: Music competition
- Locations: Mechelen, Belgium
- Inaugurated: August 28–31, 1987
- Founder: Royal Carillon School "Jef Denyn"
- Previous event: July 10–14, 2024
- Next event: To be announced
- Participants: Carillonneurs
- Patron: Fabiola of Belgium
- Website: Official website

The Queen Fabiola Competition (Dutch: Koningin Fabiolawedstrijd) is an international music competition for carillon. It was established in 1987 by the Royal Carillon School "Jef Denyn" to supersede the smaller annual competitions held in Belgium. Named after Queen Fabiola of Belgium, the competition's original patron, it was modeled after the Queen Elizabeth Competition. Its establishment was supported by the Flemish Government, Antwerp Province, and the city of Mechelen.

The competition involves learning several pieces of carillon music across three musical styles: baroque, romantic, and contemporary. It is extended over several days, with each contestant playing twice. A panel of judges award five prizes.

Considered the equivalent of top global competitions for piano, it has been described as the most important carillon competition in the world and the "Olympics of the carillon".

== Laurates ==
Country Key
AUS	Australia
BEL	Belgium
CAN	Canada
DNK	Denmark
FRA	France
JPN	Japan
NLD	Netherlands
POL	Poland
PRT	Portugal
UKR	Ukraine
USA	United States

Year	1st prize	2nd prize	3rd prize	4th prize	5th prize	6th prize	Ref.
2024	Joseph Min (USA)	Annie Gao (USA)	Anne Lu (CAN)	Claire Janezic (USA)	Oleksandra Makarova (UKR)	—N/a	
2019	Alex Johnson (USA)	Jasper Depraetere (BEL)	Margaret Pan (USA)	Keiran Cantilina (USA)	Peter Bray (AUS)	—N/a	
2014	Joey Brink (USA)	Brian Tang (USA)	Thomas Laue (AUS)	Rien Donkersloot (NLD)	Philippe Beullens (BEL)	—N/a	
2008	Kenneth Theunissen (BEL)	Toru Takao (JPN)	Malgosia Fiebig (POL)	Jonathan Lehrer (USA)	Monika Kaźmierczak (POL)	—N/a	
2003	Twan Bearda (NLD)	Ana Elias (PRT)	Liesbeth Janssens (BEL)	Charles Dairay (FRA)	Henk Veldman (NLD)	—N/a	
1998	Tom Van Peer (BEL)	Liesbeth Janssens (BEL)	Ann-Kirstine Christiansen (DNK)	Stefano Colletti (FRA)	Frans Haagen (NLD)	Sergej Gratchev (NLD)	
1993	Gideon Bodden (NLD)	Koen Van Assche (BEL)	Bob van Wely (NLD)	Ann-Kirstine Christiansen (DNK)	Kenneth Theunissen (BEL)	Hylke Banning (NLD)	
1990	Boudewijn Zwart (NLD)	Brian Swager (USA)	Gildas Delaporte (FRA)	Abel Chaves (PRT)	Gideon Bodden (NLD)	Peter Bremer (NLD)	
1987	Geert D'hollander (BEL)	Boudewijn Zwart (NLD)	John Gouwens (USA)	Koen Van Assche (BEL)	Eddy Mariën (BEL)	Bob van Wely (NLD)	
