= Lucas Franchoys the Elder =

Flemish painter

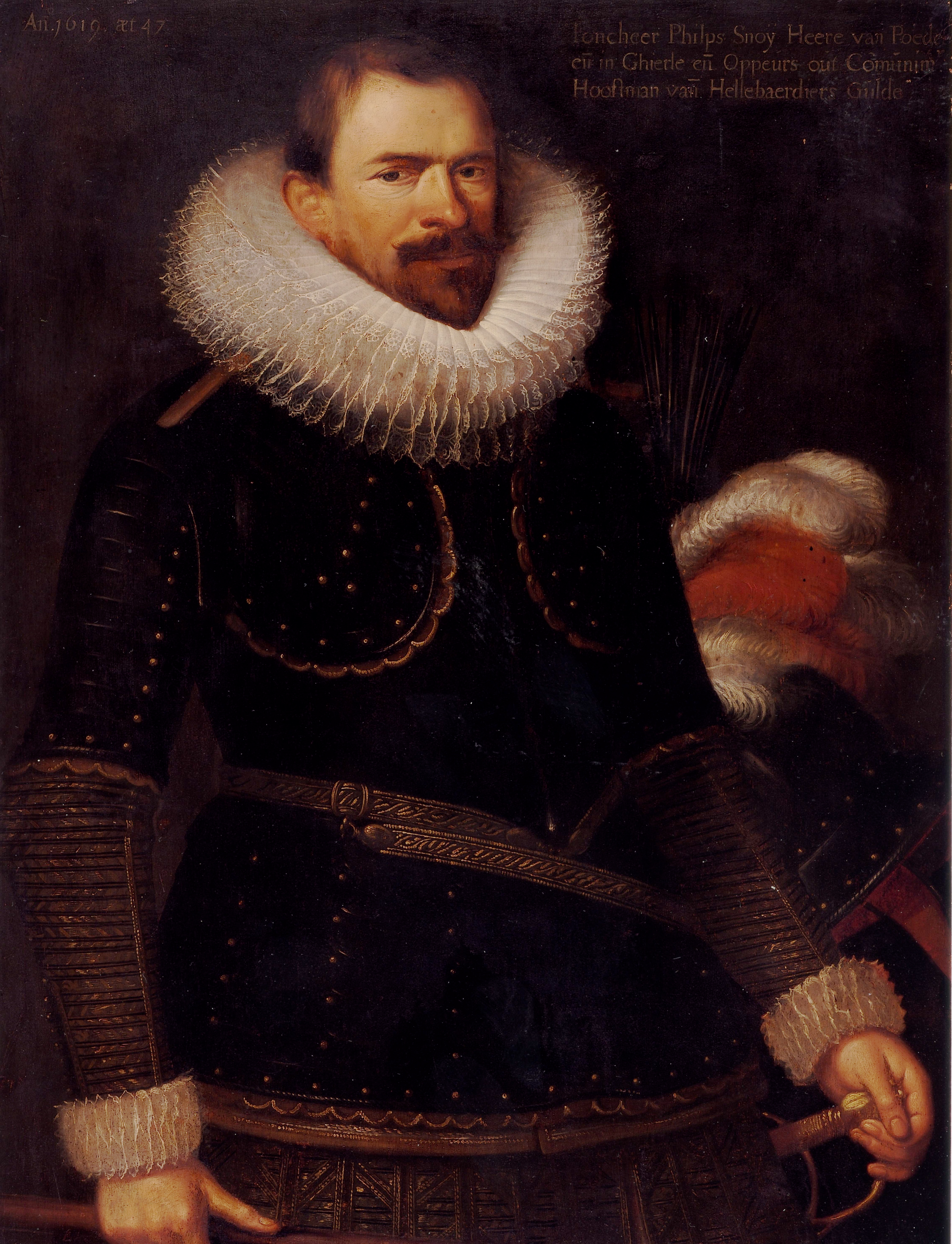
Portrait of Philip Snoy, Mayor of Mechelen

Lucas Franchoys the Elder or Lucas Francois (1574–1643) was a Flemish painter of history paintings and portraits.

== Life ==
He was born in Mechelen in a family of artists. His sister Cornelia married the sculptor Hendrik Faydherbe and their son Lucas Faydherbe became a leading Flemish Baroque sculptor. Lucas Franchoys the Elder became a master in the Mechelen Guild of St. Luke in 1599. Between 1613 and 1640 he was deacon of the guild six times.

He married Catharina du Pont on 13 January 1605. The couple had three daughters and two sons. He taught both of his sons, Lucas Franchoys the Younger and Peter Franchoys, the art of painting. In the years 1602–1604 he was court painter in Paris and Madrid. In Paris, he worked for Henri, Prince of Condé for whom he painted many portraits. In 1610 he painted a Pietà for the Saint Bavo Cathedral in Ghent.

He died in Mechelen.

== Work ==
The early Dutch biographer Arnold Houbraken described Franchoys as a painter known for his portraits and historical allegories. His clients belonged to the elite.
