= Royal Carillon School "Jef Denyn" =

Music school in Mechelen, Belgium

- Koninklijke Beiaardschool "Jef Denyn"
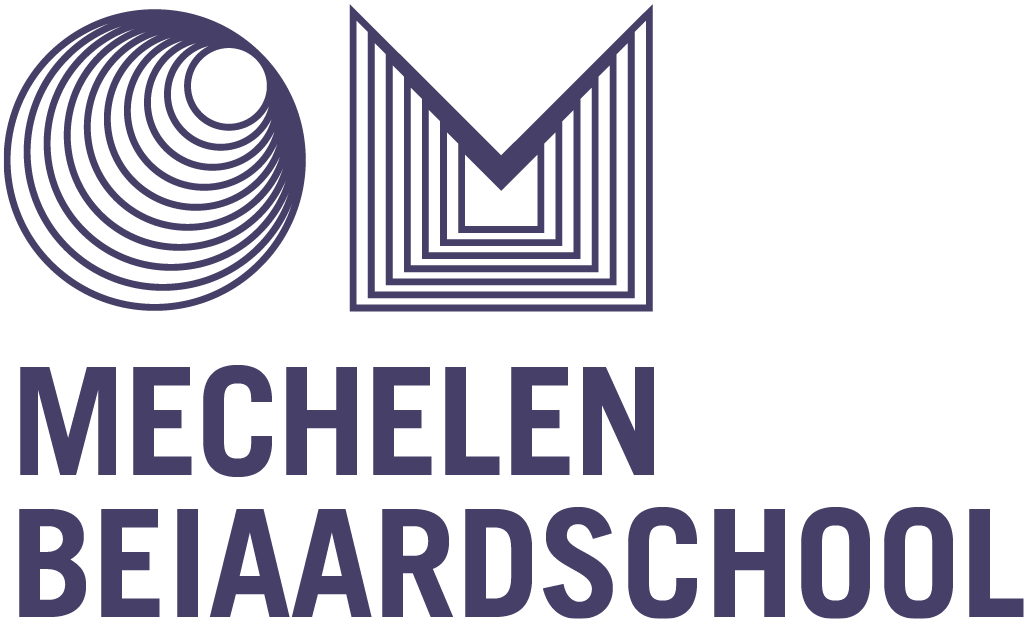
- Type: Private non-profit
- Established: August 12, 1922; 103 years ago
- Founder: Jef Denyn
- Director: Koen Cosaert
- Faculty: 8
- Location: Bruul 52, 2800, Mechelen, Belgium; 51°01′34″N 4°28′51″E
- Campus: Urban
- Website: Official website

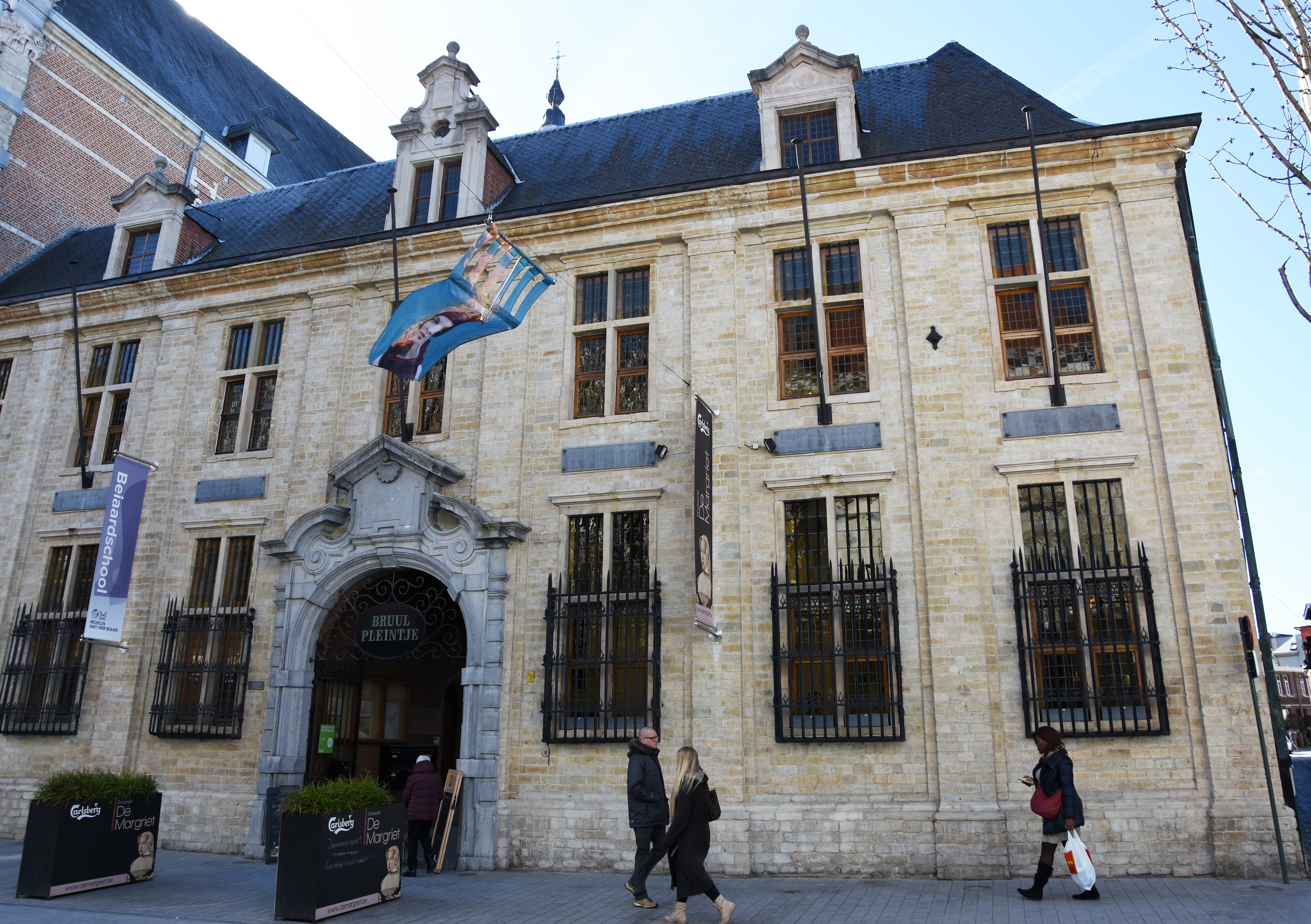
The Royal Carillon School in March 2018.

The Royal Carillon School "Jef Denyn" (Dutch: Koninklijke Beiaardschool "Jef Denyn"; informally also the Mechelen carillon school) is a music school in Mechelen, Belgium, that specializes in the carillon. It is the first and largest carillon school in the world. The school has trained many of the foremost carillonneurs of the twentieth and twenty-first centuries and houses a rich archive and library.

== History ==
The Royal Carillon School was founded on August 12, 1922, by renowned city carillonneur of Mechelen Jef Denyn, in whose honor it was later named, with the support of Americans Herbert Hoover, John D. Rockefeller, and William Gorham Rice. The first institution of its kind, the school soon gained international acclaim and has trained carillonneurs from numerous countries, including Australia, Canada, China, the Czech Republic, France, Germany, Ghana, Japan, New Zealand, Poland, Portugal, Russia, Switzerland, Taiwan, Ukraine, the United Kingdom, and the United States. At its founding, tuition was free.

The institution has developed under the successive leadership of Jef Denyn (1862–1941), Staf Nees (1901–1965), Piet Van den Broek (1916–2008), Jo Haazen (b. 1944), and its present director Koen Cosaert (b. 1963). The school has made a significant impact on carillon performance worldwide and is the originating place of the Flemish romantic style of carillon composition and performance.

In 1984, the Royal Carillon School established a branch at the Catholic University of Leuven, and Her Majesty Queen Fabiola conferred her high protection upon the school. Later that year, the school introduced the carillon tradition to Japan. In 1986, the school was elected to membership in the Russian Cultural Committee, and the first Russian students arrived in 1992. Another branch opened in Halle in 1991, and additional branches now exist in Roeselare and Peer. Though the school has always had close ties to Mechelen—each of its first four directors also acted as Mechelen city carillonneur—it operated as an independent Flemish educational institute under its own board of directors until 2008. Since then the city of Mechelen has been legally responsible for the school's administration.

The Queen Fabiola Competition was established by the school in 1987. Every five years, carillonneurs from the world over converge in Mechelen to compete in the most prestigious carillon competition in history. The school also organizes carillon composition contests and publishes works for carillon, campanological literature, and carillon method books.

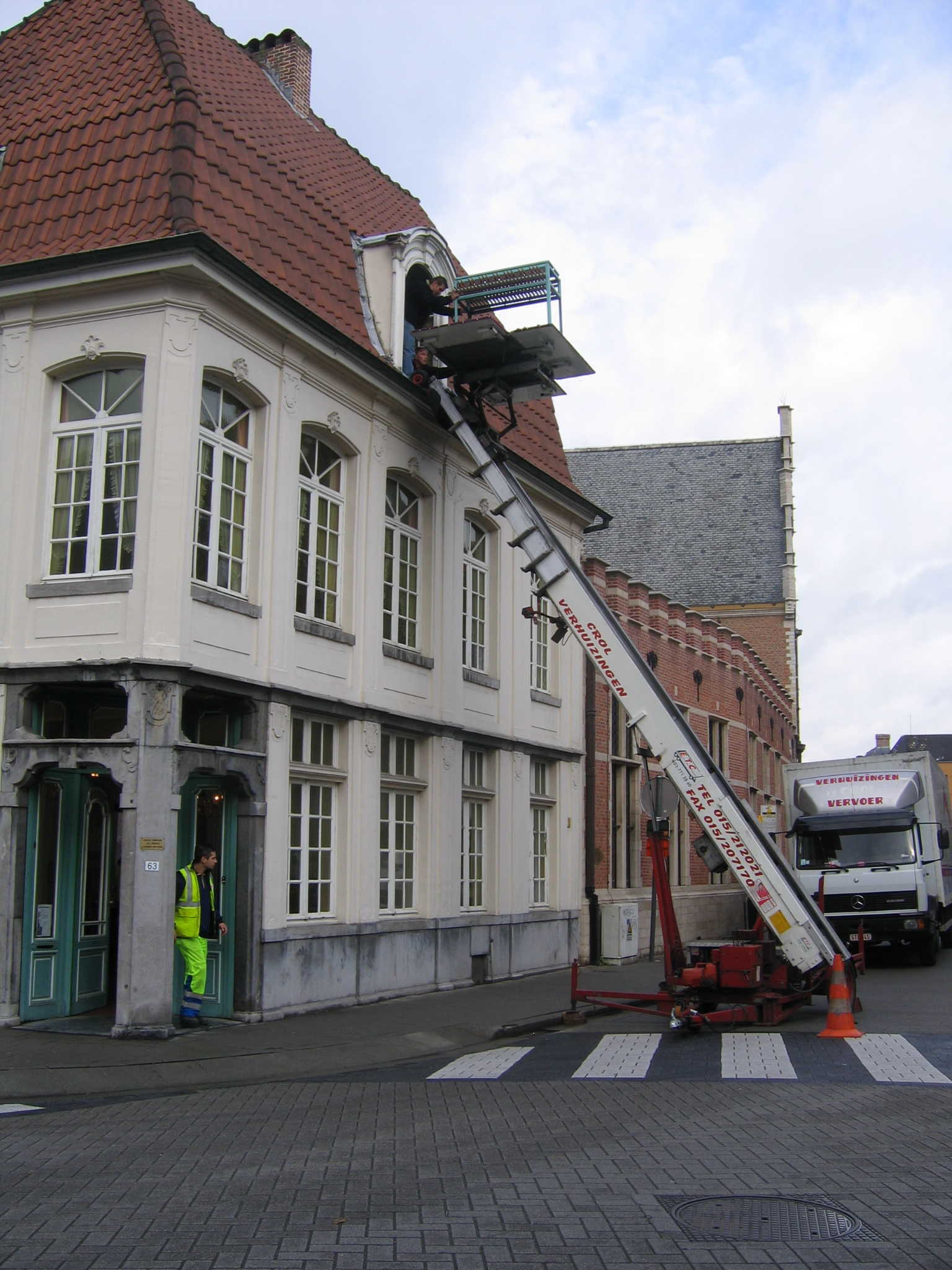
Old carillon practice keyboard being removed from the former building of the Royal Carillon School "Jef Denyn" for replacement on October 25, 2005

Prominent visitors to the school include cellist Mstislav Rostropovich, the Vienna Boys' Choir, former Hungarian president Árpád Göncz, Michael I and Queen Anne of Romania, American Ambassador to the Kingdom of Belgium Tom C. Korologos, and Her Majesty Queen Fabiola of Belgium.

Since 1995, the Flemish government has repeatedly conferred the honor upon the school of being Cultural Ambassador of Flanders.

== Facilities ==
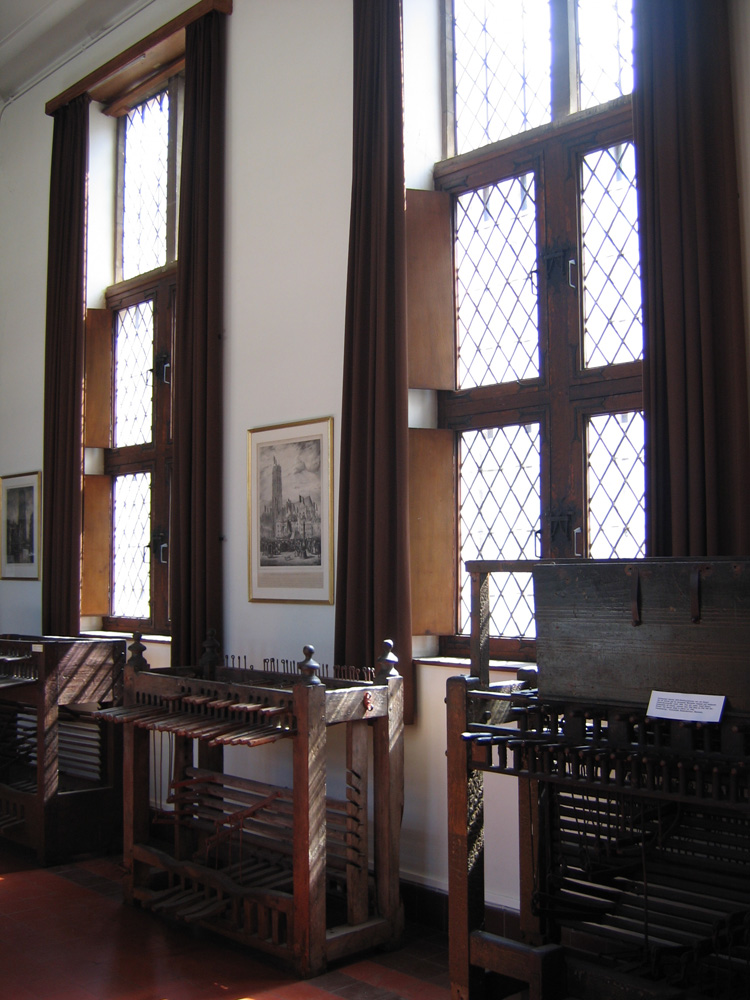
Historic carillon keyboards in the former facility of the Museum of the Royal Carillon School

For many years the Royal Carillon School was housed in the historic building 't Schipke, adjoining the Court of Busleyden, which contained the school's carillon and museum. Due to construction in the Court of Busleyden, 't Schipke was temporarily closed in autumn 2011, so the school and many of the museum holdings moved to their current location on the Bruul, Mechelen's main shopping street. While the carillon at the Court of Busleyden remains available to the school, it is now (2020) rarely used: its role in lessons, rehearsals, and school concerts has mostly been taken over by a new mobile carillon acquired by the school in 2016 and housed in its own pavilion in the Sinte-Mettetuin. In addition to the carillons and museum, school facilities include seven practice keyboards, pianos, a set of English handbells, a library of sheet music, and an important historical archive. Rehearsal and lesson time on the Mechelen city carillon in St. Rumbold's Tower is also available to advanced students. The museum and library holdings include an international collection of bells, historic carillon keyboards, rare books, manuscripts, and art objects.

== Academics ==
The Royal Carillon School "Jef Denyn" is a private state-subsidized educational institute, and its several courses of study fall under the aegis of "part-time arts education" (Dutch: deeltijds kunstonderwijs) in Flanders and Mechelen. The full curriculum covers nine or ten years depending on age at entry, but carillonneurs with prior training may graduate as quickly as within one year. Carillon performance, carillon history and campanology, improvisation, theory, harmony, composition, arranging, part-singing, handbell choir, and keyboard instruction comprise the curriculum. To graduate, each student must pass a written campanology/history exam; write and present a thesis on some aspect of carillon culture, e.g. history, campanology, technology, composition, playing technique; and perform an exam recital on the Mechelen city carillon in St. Rumbold's tower that includes baroque, romantic, and contemporary repertoire as well as works of their own (improvisation, arrangement, transcription, and/or composition).

The school also organizes occasional lectures, symposia, and masterclasses, often in conjunction with the Flemish Carillon Society and/or the Koninklijke Vereniging voor Toren en Beiaard . There is an annual school field trip to visit different carillons in Belgium, the Netherlands, or northern France. Additional student carillon trips in Belgium and the Netherlands and to international carillon congresses are organized by the student association Campana, which publishes a newsletter, 't Schipke .

The school maintains connections with higher institutes of art in Belgium, the Carillon Instituut Nederland and Bourdon Hogeschool voor Muziek in the Netherlands, and Missouri State University in the United States. The school also maintains an exchange program with the Yale Guild of Carillonneurs and relations with the State Conservatory of Saratov in Russia.

Current tuition fees amount to about 350 € per year.

== Degrees and diplomas ==
The Royal Carillon School does not offer higher education degrees recognised by any Belgian community.

Diplomas are offered at two levels of secondary education, and advanced students may continue their studies to earn a Final Diploma (Dutch: einddiploma) or the two-year Diploma of Excellence, an honor awarded to only a few students in the school's history with exceptional talent in composition. In association with the Carillon Instituut Nederland and Bourdon Hogeschool voor Muziek in the Netherlands, the school began offering bachelor's degrees in 2006. A joint master's degree in carillon with tracks in performance and pedagogy is offered jointly with Missouri State University.

== Notable alumni ==
- Émilien Allard - Composer and former carillonneur of Saint Joseph's Oratory in Montreal
- Adèle Colson - First woman to enroll in and graduate from the Royal Carillon School
- Jo Haazen - Former director of the Royal Carillon School "Jef Denyn", former city carillonneur of Mechelen and former city carillonneur of Antwerp
- Luc Rombouts - University carillonneur of the Catholic University of Leuven, city carillonneur of Tienen
- Sally Slade Warner - Carillonneur of the Cohasset Carillon, arranger of carillon music, organist
- Gladys Elinor Watkins – Carillonneur of the National War Memorial in Wellington, New Zealand

== See also ==
- List of music museums

== Bibliography ==
- Keldermans, Karel; Keldermans, Linda (1996). Carillon: The Evolution of a Concert Instrument in North America. Springfield Park District. ISBN 0-9652252-0-8. OL 1024319M.
