= Lucas Franchoys the Younger =

Flemish painter (1616–1681)

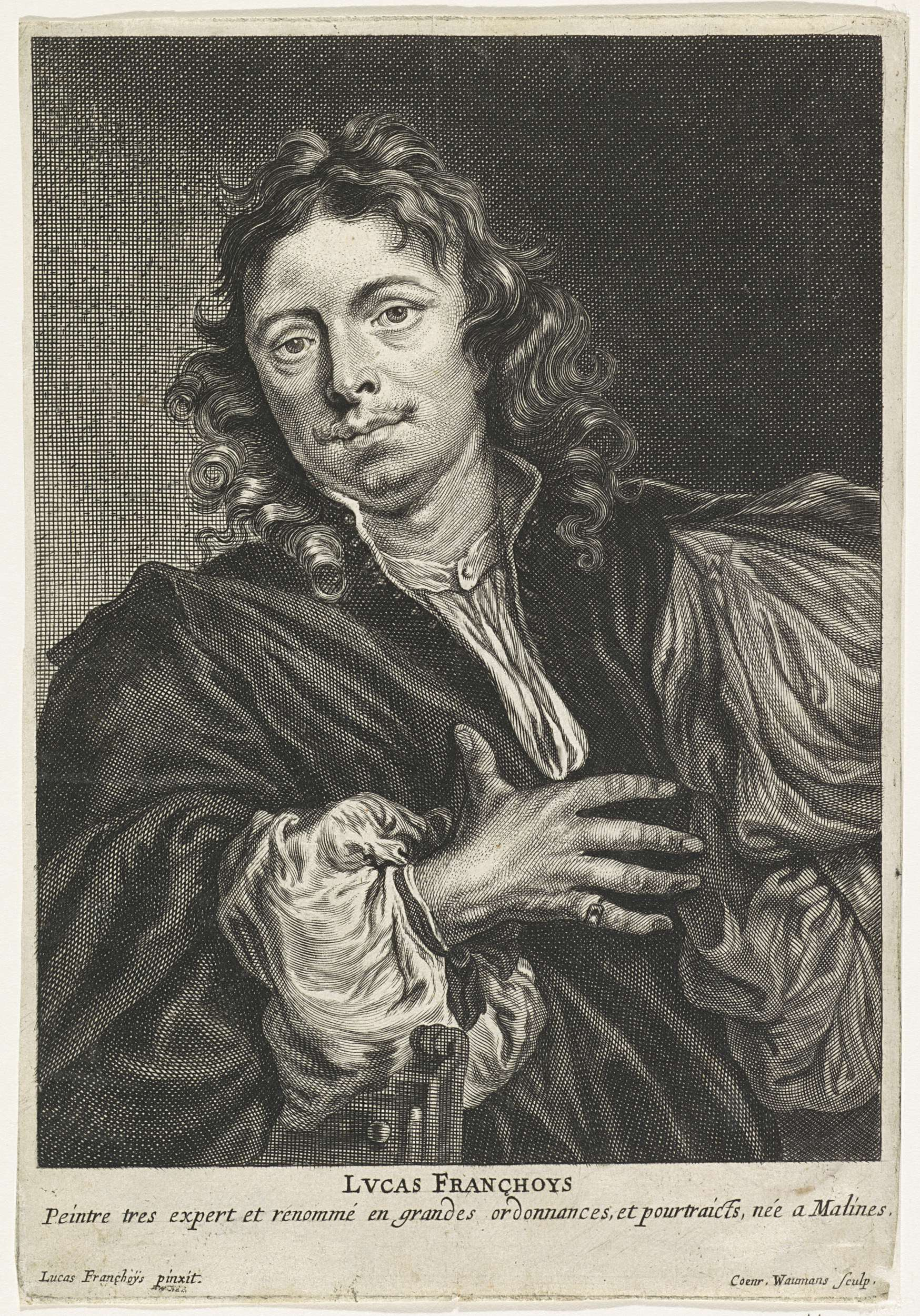
Self-portrait of Franchoys, 1649

Lucas Franchoys the Younger or Lucas Franchoys II (28 June 1616 in Mechelen – 3 April 1681 in Mechelen) was a Flemish Baroque painter from Mechelen, who painted numerous altarpieces and portraits in a style reminiscent of Anthony van Dyck.

== Life ==
Franchoys first learned to paint from his father Lucas Franchoys the Elder in his native Mechelen. Just like his older brother Peter before him, he likely continued his training in Antwerp, then the centre of Flemish painting. The early biographer Cornelis de Bie mentions a period of training with Peter Paul Rubens but there is no other evidence for this.

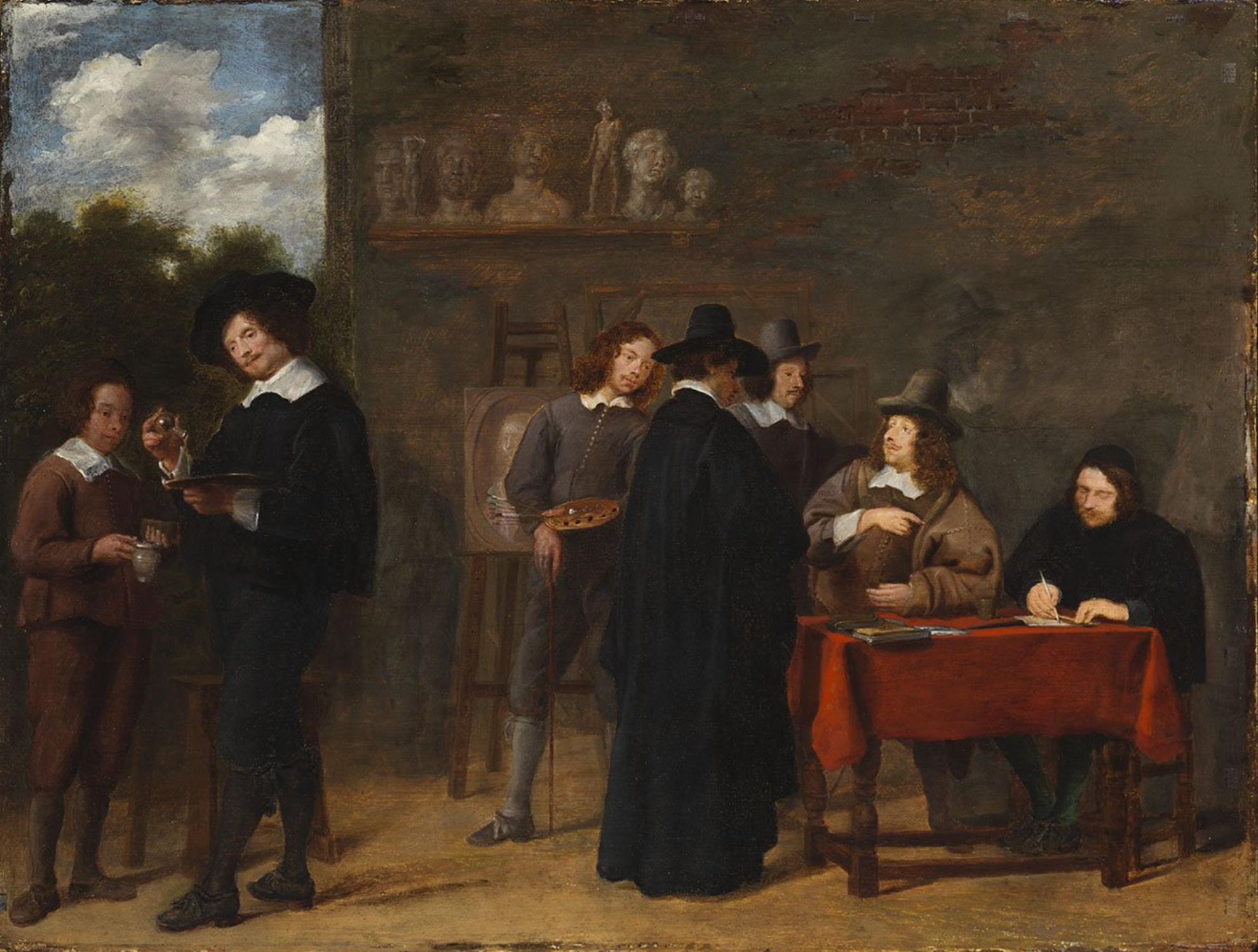
Daniel Seghers Commissions his Portrait from Lucas Franchoys

The first record of his paintings dates to 1649 when he was working on commissions for churches in Tournai, where he lived for some years. The early biographer Cornelis de Bie states that Franchoys resided for a longer period in France but this may be due to confusion based on his residence in Tournai in the French-speaking part of the Southern Netherlands close to France.

He returned to Mechelen by 1654 and became master of the local Guild of Saint Luke the following year. In 1663 he became the deacon of the Guild. In Mechelen he received many commissions from churches, monasteries and convents for altarpieces and other religious paintings. He also painted portraits including that of his patron Archbishop Alphonse de Bergues.

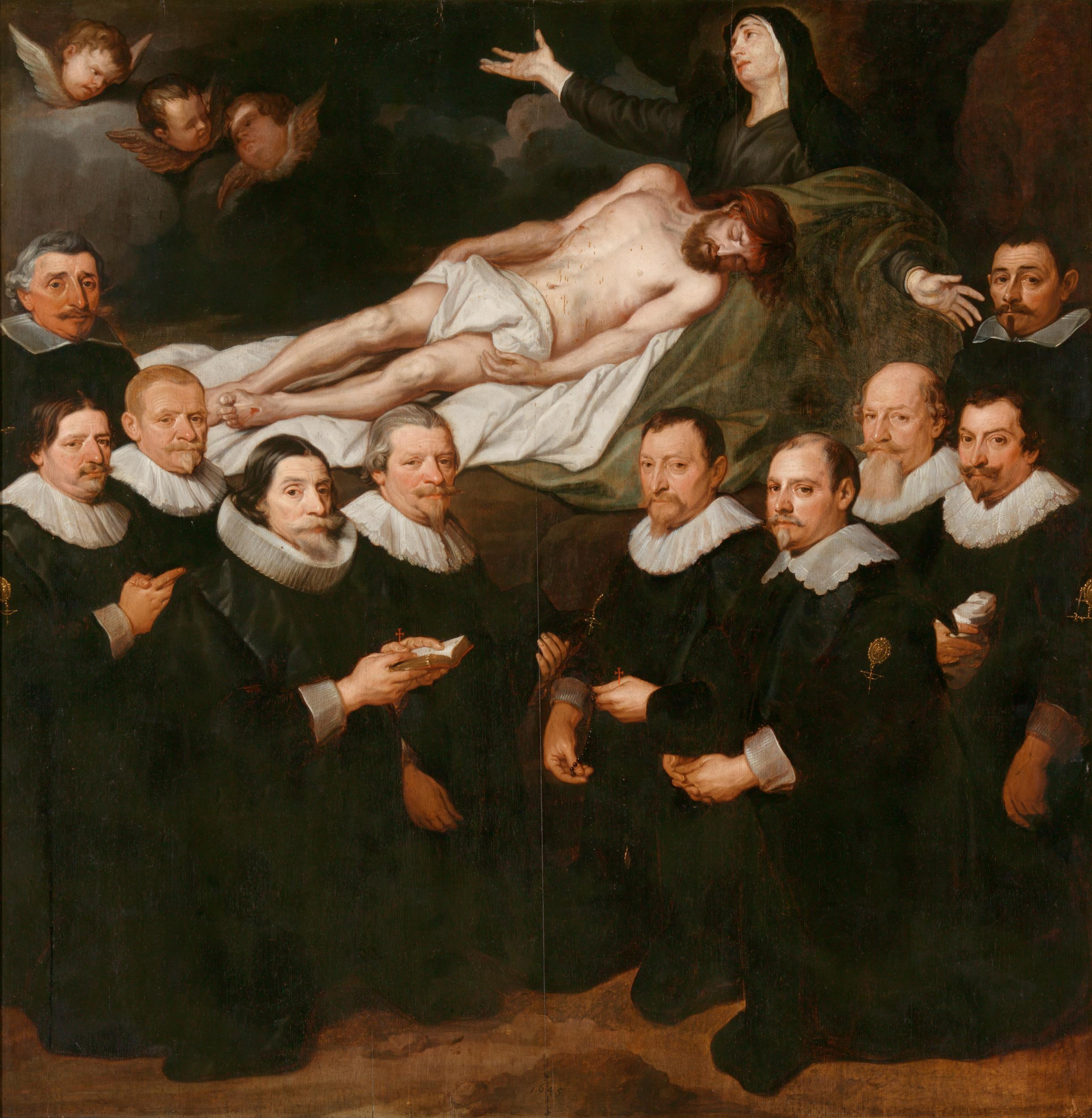
Portraits of 10 members of city guilds kneeling before a Pieta

He married Suzanne Thérèse and the couple had 8 children, of whom Lucas Elias became a painter.

He was the teacher of Sebastiaen van Aken.

== Work ==
The early Dutch biographer Arnold Houbraken wrote that Lucas Franchoys was known for his portraits and historical allegories, in which the hand of Peter Paul Rubens could easily be recognized. However, Franchoys' style is more closely linked with that of Anthony van Dyck than that of Rubens.

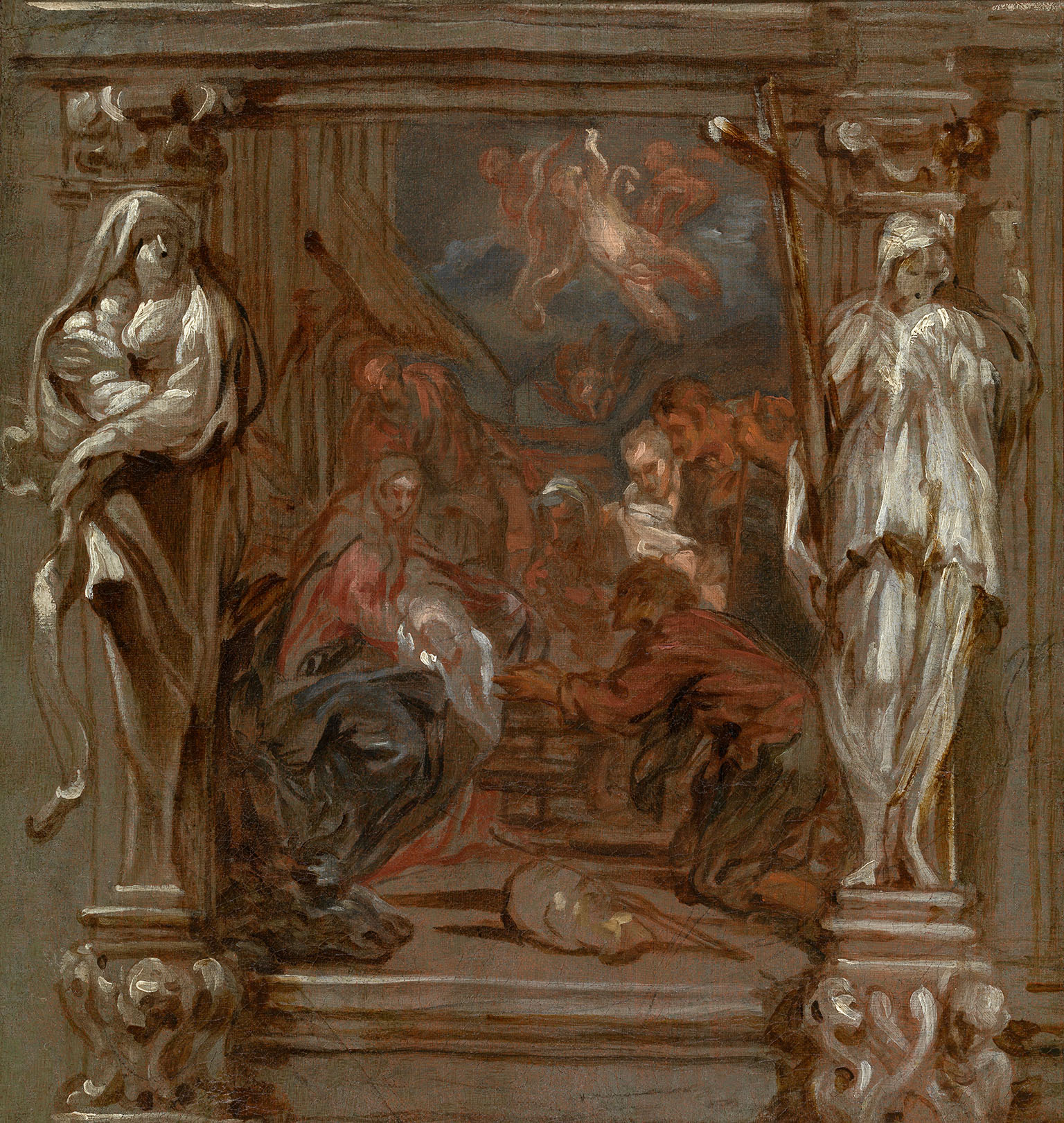
Adoration of the shepherds

Through his many monumental altarpieces in churches in Tournai and in Mechelen Franchoys built a reputation as one of the leading religious painters of the second half of the 17th century. These works show the influence of the later works of Anthony van Dyck, after which Franchoys made several etchings and with whom he also collaborated. Franchoys tends to emphasize emotionality in his religious iconography. The style in his early paintings from his time in Tournai is not mature and suffers from cramped composition and the painting of robust figures. His later works painted in Mechelen display a more effective composition of the figures and more expressiveness in the poses. In this later work Franchoys shows a strong similarity with the work of Pieter Thijs, another contemporary working under the influence of van Dyck.

Franchoys' portraits depict his sitters in a calculated informality in the style van Dyck's portraits. His self-portrait, only known from an engraving by Coenraet Waumans, is close in style to the engraved artist portraits in van Dyck's 'Iconography'.

He collaborated with many contemporary painters including Lucas Achtschellinck, Jacques d'Arthois, Gregoire Beerings, Wilhelm Schubert van Ehrenberg, Egide Smeyers and Frans Snyders.
