= Peter Franchoys =

Flemish Baroque painter

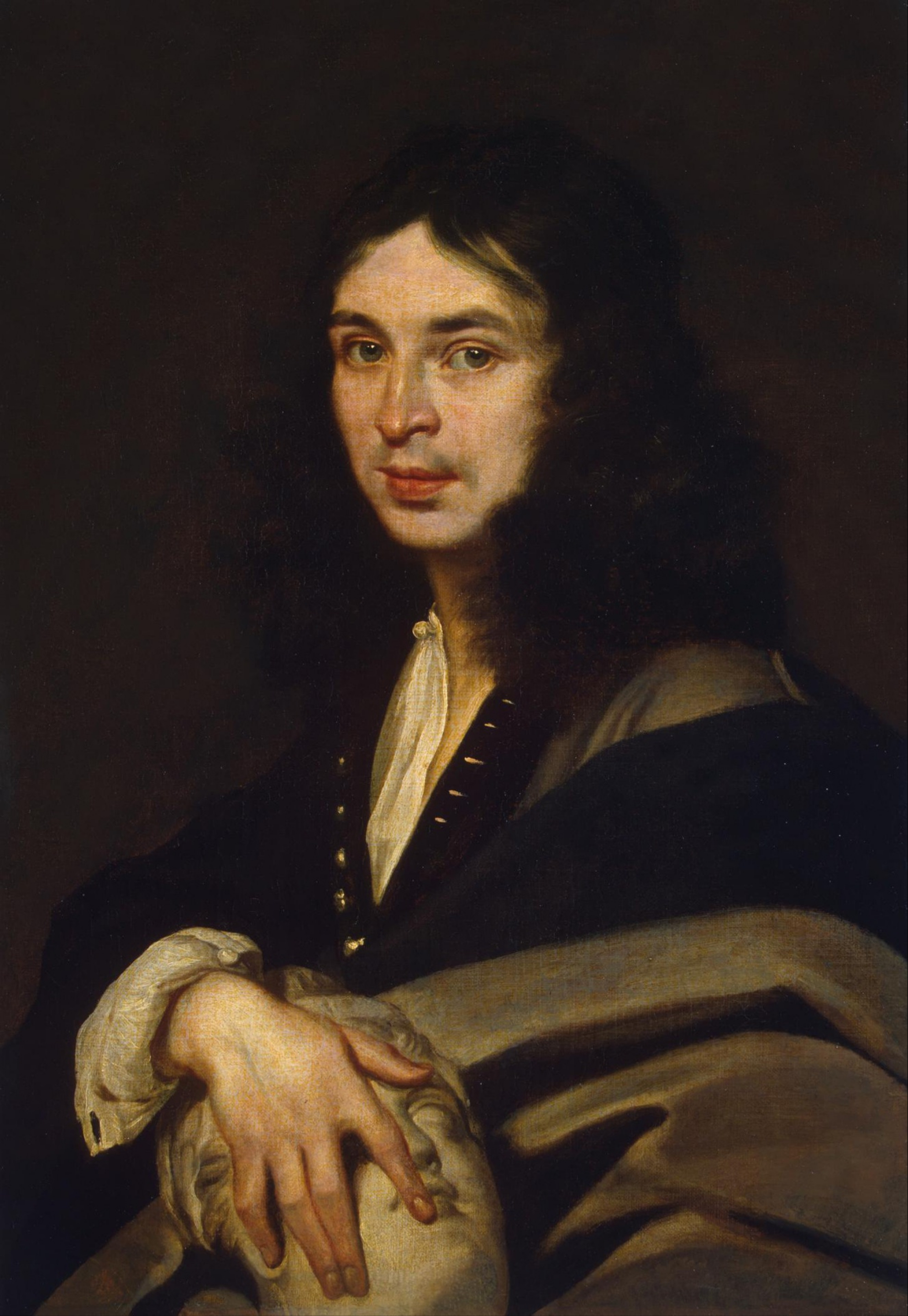
Self -portrait

Peter, Peeter or Pieter Franchoys or Francois (1606 in Mechelen – 1654 in Mechelen) was a Flemish Baroque painter, who is mainly known for his portraits and religious paintings.

== Life ==
He studied painting with his father, Lucas Franchoys the Elder, and later, according to the early biographer Cornelis de Bie, with Gerard Seghers in Antwerp. He is subsequently recorded in Brussels, where he worked for the governor of the Southern Netherlands Archduke Leopold Wilhelm of Austria.

In 1631 he traveled to France and is recorded in Paris and Fontainebleau. He returned to Mechelen in 1635. In 1646 he became a member of the Mechelen schutterij and in 1649 he became a master in the Guild of St. Luke there. Ignatius Croon was his pupil.

His younger brother Lucas was also a successful painter.

== Work ==
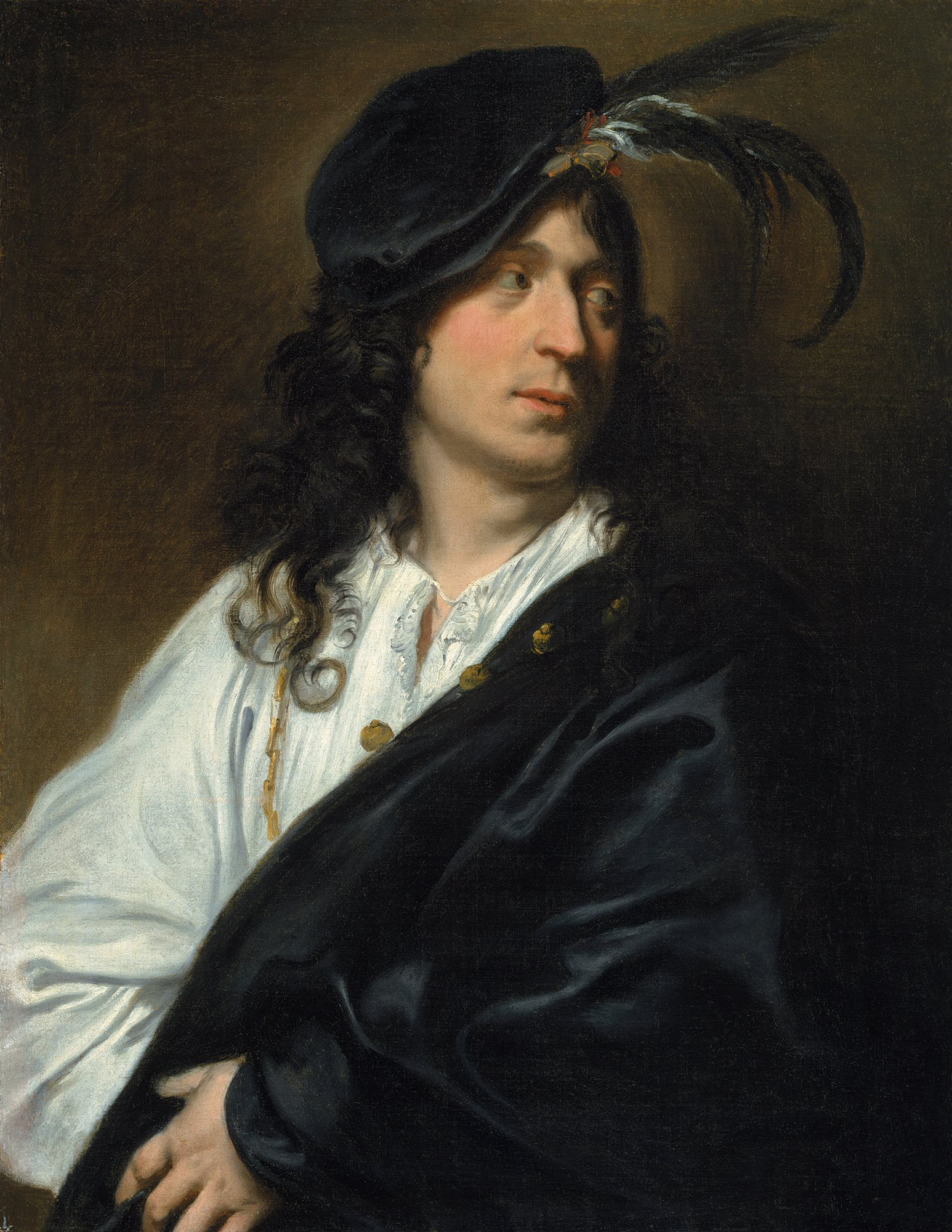
Portrait of a young man

Peter Franchoys is now mainly known as a painter of portraits and religious subjects. His portraits are stylistically related to his brother's portraits who represented his sitters with a form of calculated informality. This style was influenced by Anthony van Dyck as well as by French models of portrait painting. The French influence is seen in the more static approach as opposed to the dynamic quality of Flemish Baroque portrait paintings.

Among his religious works is the altarpiece representing Calvary in the St. Gummarus church in Lier, Belgium.

The description by the early Dutch biographer Arnold Houbraken of Peter Franchoys as someone who 'liked to paint landscapes with small figures' does not appear to fit the currently known oeuvre of Franchoys, which consists primarily of portraits and some religious works.

Peter Franchoys was also active as an etcher. The Rijksmuseum has an etching by Franchoys representing Christ and St John the Baptist as Children. He also made an etching depicting St Peter chasing a French soldier from Louvain.
