= Jef Denyn =

Belgian carillonneur (1862–1941)

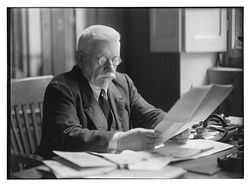
Jef Denyn founded the Royal Carillon School in Mechelen, Belgium.

Joseph Guillaume François "Jef" Denyn (/jɛf dəˈnaɪn/ yef də-NYNE; 19 March 1862 – 2 October 1941) was a Belgian carillon player from Mechelen. He originally studied to be an engineer. His carilloning career started in 1881 when his father, the official carilloneer of Mechelen, went blind and became unable to play. This caused Denyn to take over. In 1887, Denyn was recognised for his skills and officially appointed to the same position his father had held. He used his engineering knowledge to vastly improve the technology surrounding carillons, which is now used all over Europe and the United States. In 1922, he founded the world's first and most renowned international higher institute of campanology, later named after him, the Royal Carillon School "Jef Denyn" (Dutch: Koninklijke Beiaardschool "Jef Denyn") in Mechelen.

During the First World War, he, his wife Helene, son and four daughters were among those Belgian refugees who fled to England. The Denyn family were taken in by organist and musicologist William Wooding Starmer (1866–1927) in his house in Tunbridge Wells.
