= Diana Trilling =

American literary critic and author

- Born: Diana Rubin; July 21, 1905; United States
- Died: October 23, 1996 (aged 91); New York City, U.S.
- Occupation: Literary critic
- Spouse: Lionel Trilling (m. 1929; died 1975)
- Children: James Trilling

Diana Trilling (née Rubin; July 21, 1905 – October 23, 1996) was an American literary critic and author, one of a group of left-wing writers known as the New York Intellectuals.

== Background ==
Born Diana Rubin, she married the literary and cultural critic Lionel Trilling in 1929 after an extended stay in Paris with childhood friend Margaret Lefranc. Her parents, Sadie (née Forbert) and Joseph Rubin, were Polish Jews, her father from Warsaw and her mother from the local countryside. She graduated from Radcliffe College.

== Career ==
Diana Trilling was a reviewer for The Nation magazine. Her works include We Must March My Darlings (1977), an essay collection; Mrs. Harris (1981), a study of and meditation on the trial of Jean Harris; and The Beginning of the Journey (1993), a memoir of her life and marriage to Lionel Trilling.

She was elected a Fellow of the American Academy of Arts and Sciences in 1976.

== Cultural impact ==
Carolyn Heilbrun wrote about Trilling in her own final memoirs, When Men Were the Only Models We Had (2002). In his 1986 essay collection The Moronic Inferno, Martin Amis discusses the experience of meeting Trilling and her impact on New York City:

In New York, Diana Trilling is regarded with the suspicious awe customarily reserved for the city's senior literary ladies. Whenever I announced my intention of going along to interview her, people looked at me with trepidation, a new respect, a certain holy dread. I felt I was about to enter the lion's den — or the den of the literary lionness, which is often just as dangerous.

== Works by Trilling ==
- Claremont essays (1965, Secker & Warburg)
- We must march my darlings: a critical decade (1977, Harcourt Brace Jovanovich)
- Reviewing the forties (1978, Harcourt Brace Jovanovich)
- Mrs. Harris: the death of the Scarsdale diet doctor (1981, Harcourt Brace Jovanovich)
- The beginning of the journey: the marriage of Diana and Lionel Trilling (1993, Harcourt Brace)
