= 1721 in music =

The year 1721 in music involved some significant events.

== Events ==
- December 3 – Johann Sebastian Bach marries his second wife, Anna Magdalena.
- Antonio Maria Bononcini becomes maestro di cappella in his native city of Modena.
- Georg Philipp Telemann becomes director of music in Hamburg.

== Classical music ==
- Johann Sebastian Bach
  - Brandenburg Concertos, a collection of five concerti grossi and one ripieno concerto presented to Christian Ludwig, Margrave of Brandenburg-Schwedt.
  - Capriccio in E major, BWV 993
- Giovanni Bononcini – Cantate e Duetti
- Evaristo Felice Dall'Abaco – 6 Concerti à più istrumenti, Op. 5
- Christoph Graupner – Sonata in G minor, GWV 724
- George Frideric Handel
  - Crudel tiranno amor, HWV 97
  - Keyboard Sonatina in G minor, HWV 583
- Pietro Locatelli – 12 Concerti grossi à 4 e à 5, Op. 1 (including concerto in F minor "Christmas Concerto")
- Jean-Philippe Rameau – Orphée, RCT 27
- Valentin Rathgeber – Octava musica clavium octo musicarum, R 295
- Georg Philipp Telemann
  - Ich halte aber dafür, TWV 1:840
  - Ich hoffe darauf daß du so gnädig bist, TWV 1:847
- Francesco Maria Veracini – 12 Violin Sonatas, Op. 1
- Silvius Leopold Weiss – Tombeau sur la mort de M. Comte de Logy arrivée, WSW 20

== Opera ==
- Filippo Amadei, Giovanni Bononcini & George Frideric Handel – Muzio Scevola
- Giovanni Bononcini – Crispo
- George Frideric Handel – Floridante, HWV 14
- Michel Richard de Lalande – Les élémens, S.153 (composed with André Cardinal Destouches)
- Giuseppe Maria Orlandini – Nerone
- Nicola Porpora
  - Eumene
  - Gli orti esperidi
- Alessandro Scarlatti – La Griselda
- Georg Philipp Telemann – Der Geduldige Socrates
- Antonio Vivaldi – La Silvia, RV 734
- Johann Adolph Hasse – Antioco

== Theoretical Writings ==
- Alexander Malcolm – A Treatise of Musick
- Johann Mattheson – Das forschende Orchestre
- Franz Xaver Murschhauser – Academia Musico-Poetica Bipartita
- Thomas Walter – The Grounds and Rules of Musick Explained

== Births ==
- April 1 – Pieter Hellendaal, organist, violinist and composer (died 1799)
- April 7 – Matthias van den Gheyn, composer (died 1785)
- December 9 – Peter Pelham, organist, harpsichordist and composer (d. 1805)
- December 27 (bapt.) – John Garth, composer (died 1810)
- date unknown
  - Barbara Campanini, dancer
  - Quirino Gasparini, composer (died 1778)
  - Giovanni Battista Lorenzi, Italian librettist (died 1807)
  - Antonio Ripa, Spanish composer (died 1795)

== Deaths ==
- February 22 – Johann Christoph Bach, organist, elder brother of Johann Sebastian (born 1642)
- September 3 – Jan Antonín Losy, lute player and composer (born c. 1643)
- date unknown
  - Jacques Paisible, recorder virtuoso and composer (born c. 1656)
  - Jerónimo de Carrión, composer (b. 1660)
