= 1795 in music =

== Events ==
- Joseph Haydn returns to Vienna following second London visit.
- Franz Krommer settles in Vienna.
- Ludwig van Beethoven makes his public performance debut as a pianist

== Popular Music ==
- Charles Dibdin - Jackey and the Cow (from 'Christmas Gambols')

== Opera ==
- Louis Emmanuel Jadin Le Cabaleur
- Vicente Martín y Soler – La Capricciosa Correta
- Antonio Salieri – Palmira

== Classical music ==
- Johann Georg Albrechtsberger – 6 String Trios, Op. 9
- Ludwig van Beethoven
  - 12 Minuets, WoO 7
  - German Dances, WoO 8
  - 6 Minuets, WoO 9
  - 6 Minuets, WoO 10
  - Variations on 'Là ci darem la mano', WoO 28
  - 9 Variations on 'Quant'e piu bello', WoO 69
  - 6 Variations on 'Nel cor piu non mi sento', WoO 70
  - Im Arm der Liebe ruht sich's wohl, WoO 159
  - Three Piano Trios, Op. 1
  - String Quintet in E-flat major, Op.4
  - Sextet in E-flat major, Op.81b
  - Rondo a capriccio, Op.129
- Muzio Clementi – 2 Piano Sonatas and 2 Capriccios, Op. 34
- Jean-Louis Duport – 6 Cello Sonatas, Op. 4
- Adalbert Gyrowetz
  - Three Flute Quartets, Op. 11
  - 3 String Quartets, Op. 19
- Thomas Haigh – 3 Keyboard Sonatas, Op. 10
- Joseph Haydn
  - Symphonies 103 in E-flat "Drum Roll" and 104 in D "London"
  - Piano Trios Op. 82, Including XV:24, 25, 26
  - Piano Trio in E-flat minor, Hob.XV:31
  - 150 Scottish Songs, Hob.XXXIa:1–150 (Volume III, 101–150)
- Heinrich Anton Hoffmann – 3 String Quartets, Op. 3
- Johann Nepomuk Hummel – Piano Sonata No. 8
- Hyacinthe Jadin
  - 3 String Quartets, Op. 1
  - 3 Piano Sonatas, Op. 4
- Hans Georg Nägeli – Freut euch des Lebens (song)
- Ignaz Pleyel – Keyboard Trio in D major, B.461
- Joseph Reicha – Concerto Concertant, Op. 3
- Daniel Gottlob Turk – 120 Handstücke für angehende Klavierspieler, Vol 2.
- Giovanni Battista Viotti – Violin Concerto No.24 in B minor
- Friedrich Witt – Horn concerto in E major
- Francesco Molino - 3 Guitar Sonatas, Op.6

== Methods and theory writings ==
- Johann Ernst Altenburg – Versuch einer Anleitung zur heroisch-musikalischen Trompeter und Pauker-Kunst
- Giuseppe Aprile – The Modern Italian Method of Singing
- Giuseppe Maria Cambini – Méthode pour la flûte traversiere
- Justin Heinrich Knecht – Vollständige Orgelschule
- Heinrich Christoph Koch – Über den Charakter der Solo- und Ripienstimmen

== Births ==
- January 18 – Joseph Merk, cellist (died 1852)
- March 14 – Robert Lucas Pearsall, composer (died 1856)
- March 23 – Leopold Jansa, composer (died 1875)
- April 4 – Joseph Böhm, violinist and music teacher (died 1876)
- April 14 – Pedro Albéniz, pianist and composer (died 1855)
- June 13 – Anton Felix Schindler, biographer of Beethoven (died 1864)
- May 27 – Friedrich August Belcke, trombonist (died 1874)
- August 16 – Heinrich Marschner, composer (died 1861)
- August 17 – Pierre-Louis Parisis, dedicatee and bishop (died 1866)
- September 16 – Saverio Mercadante, Italian composer (died 1870)
- September 29 – Kondraty Ryleyev, lyricist and poet (died 1826)
- October 17 – Johann Christoph Biernatzki, librettist and writer (died 1840)
- October 31 – John Keats, lyricist and poet (died 1821)
- November 17 – Antonio Bagioli, composer and music teacher (died 1871)
- December 10 – Kaspar Kummer, composer and flautist (died 1870)
- date unknown – Jeanne-Catherine Pauwels, Belgian pianist (died 1889)

== Deaths ==
- January 19 – Maria Teresa Agnesi, Italian composer (born 1720)
- January 21 – Michel Corrette, organist and composer (b. 1707)
- January 26 – Johann Christoph Friedrich Bach, composer (b. 1732)
- February 11 – Carl Michael Bellman, composer (b. 1740)
- March 5 – Josef Reicha, cellist, conductor and composer (b. 1752)
- May 22 – Friedrich Wilhelm Marpurg, composer and music critic (b. 1718)
- July – Ranieri de' Calzabigi, librettist (b. 1714)
- August 19 – Friedrich Hartmann Graf, German composer (born 1727)
- August 31 – François-André Danican Philidor, French composer and chess player (born 1726)
- September 22 – Sayat-Nova, composer and musician (born 1712)
- October 3 – John Christopher Smith, English composer (born 1712)
- October 11 – Franz Christoph Neubauer, German composer (born 1750)
- October 25 – Francesco Antonio Baldassare Uttini, Italian composer (born 1723)
- November 3 – Antonio Ripa, Spanish composer (b. 1721)
- November 6 – Georg Benda, composer (b. 1722)
- November 19 – Thomas Linley the elder, conductor and composer (b. 1733)
- December 6 – Sofia Liljegren, Finnish soprano (b. 1765)
