= List of carillons in Belgium =

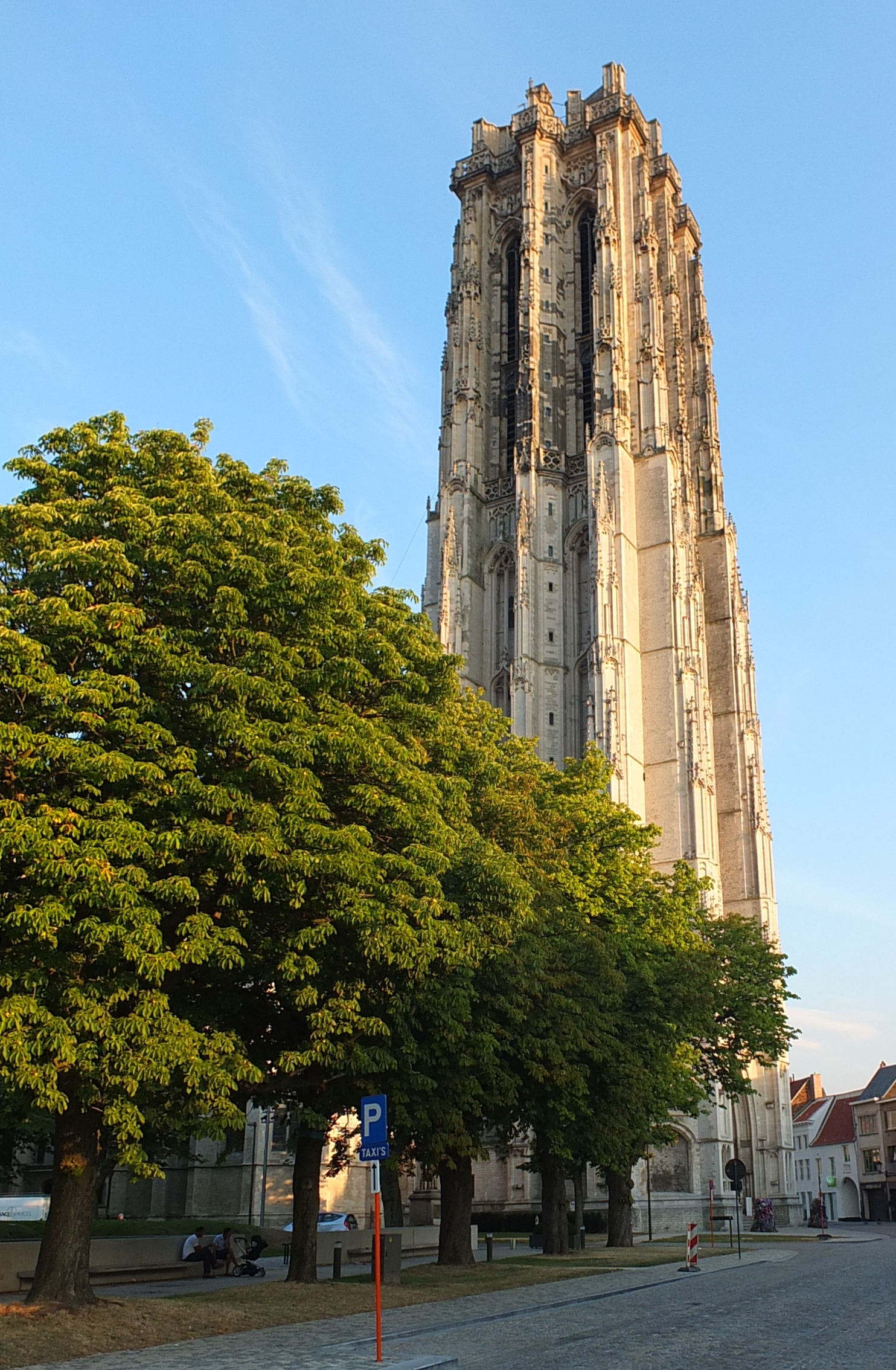
The tower of St. Rumbold's Cathedral in Mechelen contains two large, 49-bell carillons

Carillons, musical instruments of bells in the percussion family, are found throughout Belgium. Several institutions maintain registries on the location and statistics of carillons. Some registries specialize in counting specific types of carillons. For example, the War Memorial and Peace Carillons registry counts instruments which serve as war memorials or were built in the name of promoting world peace (and tracks five in Belgium); the World Carillon Federation counts carillons throughout the country, along with the rest of the world.

Two Belgian carillon associations – the Flemish Carillon Association and the Walloon Carillon Association – count carillons in their respective regions. According to their registries, there are 94 carillons in Belgium: 70 in the Flemish Region, 22 in the Walloon Region, and 2 in the Brussels Capital Region. They are distributed across 77 different cities; several are located within the same city, and two are even within the same building – at St. Rumbold's Cathedral in Mechelen. The population has a wide range in total weights, with bourdons spanning between 30 and 8,180 kilograms (66 and 18,034 lb). They also span a wide range of notes, from 21 (which the Flemish association considers a carillon despite failing its definition that requires at least 23) up to 64. Many carillons were constructed over several centuries by several bellfounders; a minority are constructed entirely by a single bellfounder. The majority of carillons are transposing instruments, and often transpose such that the lowest note on the keyboard is B♭ or C.

According to the World Carillon Federation, the carillons in Belgium account for 14 percent of the world's total and is consequently considered one of the "great carillon countries" along with the Netherlands and the United States.

== Brussels ==
Despite not being a part of their respective regions, both the Flemish Carillon Association and the Walloon Carillon Association track the number of carillons located in the Brussels Capital Region, of which there are two. The larger both in terms of weight and number of bells is located at the Cathedral of St. Michael and St. Gudula. The smaller is located at the Palace of the Nation, Belgium's federal parliament building. Constructed in the 20th century, these carillons are much newer relative to others in the country. Brussels once had nine carillons in 1541; none survived past 1914.

List of carillons in Brussels
Location	City	Bells	Bourdon weight		Total weight		Range and transposition	Bellfounder(s)	Ref.
Location	City	Bells	kg	lb	kg	lb	Range and transposition	Bellfounder(s)	Ref.
Palace of the Nation	Brussels	37	254	560	1,353	2,983	Up 12 semitones	Royal Eijsbouts 1985–88	
Cathedral of St. Michael and St. Gudula	Brussels	49	3,164	6,975	15,797	34,826	None (concert pitch)	Royal Eijsbouts 1958–75	

== Flanders ==
The Flemish Carillon Association maintains a registry of carillons in the Flemish Region. According to the organization, there are 70 carillons located in Flanders. They are distributed across 56 different cities; several are located within the same city, and two are even within the same building – at St. Rumbold's Cathedral in Mechelen. The carillons have a wide range in total weights, with bourdons spanning between 39 and 8,180 kilograms (86 and 18,034 lb). They also span a wide range of notes, from 21 (which the association considers a carillon despite failing its definition that requires at least 23) up to 64. Many carillons were constructed over several centuries by several bellfounders; a minority are constructed entirely by a single bellfounder. The majority of carillons are transposing instruments, and often transpose such that the lowest note on the keyboard is B♭ or C.

List of carillons in Flanders
Location		City	Bells	Bourdon weight		Total weight		Range and transposition	Bellfounder(s)	Ref.
Location		City	Bells	kg	lb	kg	lb	Range and transposition	Bellfounder(s)	Ref.
	Schepenhuis	Aalst	52	628	1,385	3,827	8,437	Up 12 semitones	Lokeren 1958	
	Aarschot Peace Carillon Church of Our Lady	Aarschot	51	—N/a		5,347	11,788	Up 5 semitones	Royal Eijsbouts 2018	
	Cathedral of Our Lady	Antwerp	49	4,963	10,942	27,648	60,953	Down 3 semitones	Hoerken 1459; Hemony 1655–58; Royal Eijsbouts 1972–90	
	St. Catherine's Church	Antwerp	47	250	550	1,820	4,010	Up 12 semitones	Van Aerschodt 1910; Petit & Fritsen 1993	
	District House of Borgerhout	Antwerp	47	1,056	2,328	5,531	12,194	Up 5 semitones	Royal Eijsbouts 1977	
	St. Martin's Church (Open-air carillon)	Antwerp	37	270	600	1,808	3,986	Up 12 semitones	Petit & Fritsen 1968	
	Belfry of Bruges	Bruges	47	5,381	11,863	27,535	60,704	Down 5 semitones	Dumery 1742–48; Royal Eijsbouts 2010	
	Damme City Hall	Damme	39	143	315	1,168	2,575	Up 16 semitones	Petit & Fritsen 1960; Royal Eijsbouts 1986–94	
	Church of Our Lady	Deinze	48	784	1,728	4,417	9,738	Up 7 semitones	Royal Eijsbouts 1988–94	
	Belfry of Dendermonde	Dendermonde	49	1,225	2,701	6,800	15,000	Up 5 semitones	Michiels 1948–49; Sergeys 1975; Royal Eijsbouts 2005	
	Saint Aldegondis Church	Dendermonde	21	39	86	381	840	Up 24 semitones	Dumery 1760; Van Aerschodt 1870; Petit & Fritsen 1993	
	Church of Saint-Sulpice	Diest	47	592	1,305	3,190	7,030	Up 8 semitones	Hemony brothers 1671; Sergeys 1973	
	Belfry of Diksmuide	Diksmuide	30	160	350	1,100	2,400	Up 16 semitones	Michiels 1935	
	St. Martin's Church	Genk	52	2,339	5,157	11,577	25,523	Up 2 semitones	Petit & Fritsen 1960	
	St Bartholomew's Church	Geraardsbergen	49	1,800	4,000	8,787	19,372	Up 3 semitones	Vrane 1428; Grognart 1588; Tordeur 1601–37; Unknown 1652/1730; Dumery 1750–62; Vanden Gheyn 1779; Michiels 1939; Royal Eijsbouts 1981–2003	
	Belfry of Ghent	Ghent	54	6,050	13,340	30,129	66,423	Down 3 semitones	Hemony brothers 1659–61; Pauwels 1713; Dumery 1749; Royal Eijsbouts 1981–93	
	Basilica of Saint Servatius	Grimbergen	49	1,284	2,831	7,017	15,470	Up 5 semitones	Horacantus 1964; Royal Eijsbouts 1998–2001	
	Saint Gorik Church	Haaltert	44	1,896	4,180	5,435	11,982	Up 16 semitones	Michiels 1946–60	
	Basilica of Saint Martin	Halle	54	3,500	7,700	12,900	28,400	Up 7 semitones	De Leenknecht van Harelbeke 1390; Walterus 1480; Waghevens 1518; Van Aerschodt 1849; Michaux 1920–21; Sergeys 1972–73	
	St. Salvator Church	Harelbeke	50	1,800	4,000	7,179	15,827	Up 7 semitones	Michiels 1959	
	St. Quentin Cathedral	Hasselt	53	3,175	7,000	10,980	24,210	Up 4 semitones	Bernard 1729–31; Vanden Gheyn 1751–52; Sergeys 1938–65; Petit & Fritsen 1971	
—N/a	Vernimmen Garden	Herent	28	200	440	1,100	2,400	—N/a	Van Aerschodt 1912–14	
	Belfry of Herentals	Herentals	49	485	1,069	2,883	6,356	Up 1 semitone	Regnault 1649; Van Aerschodt 1843; Petit & Fritsen 1961	
	Schepenhuis	Herzele	28	272	600	1,660	3,660	Up 12 semitones	Horacantus 1952	
	St Catherine's Church	Hoogstraten	50	1,823	4,019	11,777	25,964	Up 3 semitones	Hemony 1654–55; Michiels 1954–59	
	St. Hilonius Church	Izegem	47	2,109	4,650	10,064	22,187	Up 1 semitone	Slegers-Causard 1921; Michiels 1923–60	
	Belfry of Kortrijk	Kortrijk	48	310	680	1,945	4,288	Up 11 semitones	Royal Eijsbouts 1994	
	Saint Martin's Church	Kortrijk	49	5,060	11,160	18,490	40,760	None (concert pitch)	Van Aerschodt 1865–80; Michiels 1955; Sergeys 1974	
	Saint Martin's Church	Lede	24	54	119	800	1,800	Up 12 semitones	Michiels 1952–55	
	Saint Gertrude's Abbey	Leuven	49	3,750	8,270	15,061	33,204	Up 1 semitone	Zeelstman 1446; Vanden Gheyn 1777–79; Van Aerschodt 1845–47; Sergeys 1954–71	
	St. Peter's Church	Leuven	49	4,280	9,440	17,500	38,600	Up 1 semitone	Sergeys 1930–61; Royal Eijsbouts 1990	
	Academic libraries in Leuven	Leuven	63	7,096	15,644	35,349	77,931	Down 4 semitones	Gillett & Johnston 1928; Royal Eijsbouts 1983	
	Park Abbey	Leuven	40	2,132	4,700	10,616	23,404	Up 1 semitone	Royal Eijsbouts 2018	
	Church of St. John the Baptist	Leuven	45	189	417	1,333	2,939	Up 14 semitones	Gillett & Johnston 1928; Royal Eijsbouts 2009	
	Saint Gummarus Church	Lier	52	7,638	16,839	19,781	43,610	Down 2 semitones	Jullien 1704–32; Huart 1781; Michiels 1925; Sergeys 1976; Royal Eijsbouts 2003–04	
	Saint Laurentius Church	Lokeren	49	3,660	8,070	16,790	37,020	—N/a	Horacantus 1955–56	
	Church of Saint Peter-in-Chains	Lommel	63	3,263	7,194	15,493	34,156	None (concert pitch)	Michiels 1955; Royal Eijsbouts 2000	
	St. Rumbold's Cathedral (Old carillon)	Mechelen	49	8,000	18,000	36,000	79,000	Down 4 semitones	Waghevens 1480–1515; Steylaert 1564; Hemony 1674; De Haze 1696–97; Dumery 1735; Vanden Gheyn 1766–84; Van Aerschodt 1844–60; Michiels 1906–52	
	St. Rumbold's Cathedral (New carillon)	Mechelen	49	8,180	18,030	39,244	86,518	Down 5 semitones	Royal Eijsbouts 1981	
	Church of Our Lady-across-the-Dyle	Mechelen	50	2,217	4,888	9,123	20,113	Up 5 semitones	Michiels 1947; Horacantus 1962; Petit & Fritsen 1965	
	Court of Busleyden	Mechelen	49	420	930	2,541	5,602	Up 12 semitones	Michiels 1953	
	St. Martin's Church	Meise	56	905	1,995	4,615	10,174	Up 7 semitones	Royal Eijsbouts 2001	
	Belfry of Menen	Menen	49	770	1,700	4,764	10,503	Up 7 semitones	Simon-Chevreston 1775; Petit & Fritsen 1962	
	Saints Peter und Paul Church	Mol	49	3,240	7,140	16,504	36,385	None (concert pitch)	Michiels 1951; Royal Eijsbouts 1967	
	Postel Abbey	Mol	49	382	842	2,187	4,822	Up 12 semitones	Michiels 1947; Royal Eijsbouts 1969–88	
	Church of Saint Peter-in-Chains	Nederbrakel	49	1,996	4,400	9,645	21,264	Up 3 semitones	Michiels 1948–50; Petit & Fritsen 1959	
	Church of Our Lady	Nieuwpoort	67 (Note: Despite having 67 bells, the carillon has 49 notes. Eighteen of the notes each ring two bells.)	1,407	3,102	8,976	19,789	Up 5 semitones	Michiels 1952	
	Festivities and Culture Palace	Ostend	49	2,497	5,505	12,393	27,322	Up 2 semitones	Paccard 1964	
	St. Walburga Church	Oudenaarde	49	3,230	7,120	15,500	34,200	None (concert pitch)	Petit & Fritsen 1967	
	St. Trudo Church	Peer	64	3,705	8,168	17,234	37,994	None (concert pitch)	Petit & Fritsen 1951–99	
	Saint Nicholas Church	Pelt	48	1,060	2,340	3,564	7,857	Up 9 semitones	Petit & Fritsen 1967; Royal Eijsbouts 2015	
	St. Bertin's Church	Poperinge	47	800	1,800	4,380	9,660	—N/a	Michiels 1955; Paccard 1981	
	Saint Peter's Church	Puurs	50	505	1,113	3,890	8,580	(Range not available); Up 9 semitones	Royal Eijsbouts 2017	
	Saint Michael's Church	Roeselare	49	890	1,960	5,154	11,363	Up 7 semitones	Michiels 1939; Royal Eijsbouts 1988–92	
	Saint Hermes' Church	Ronse	49	2,355	5,192	12,211	26,921	—N/a	Van Aerschodt 1852; Michiels 1926–60; Petit & Fritsen 1963; Royal Eijsbouts 1994	
	Basilica of Our Lady	Scherpenheuvel-Zichem	49	2,812	6,199	13,200	29,100	—N/a	Vanden Gheyn 1803; Michiels 1947; Paccard 1980; Royal Eijsbouts 1991–93	
	Sint-Niklaas City Hall	Sint-Niklaas	49	850	1,870	5,200	11,500	—N/a	Vanden Gheyn 1776; Michiels 1953–54; Royal Eijsbouts 1975	
	Belfry of Sint-Truiden	Sint-Truiden	50	1,800	4,000	6,000	13,000	—N/a	Bodri 1606; Legros 1751; Vanden Gheyn 1751–92; Van Aerschodt 1886; Sergeys 1938–77; Michiels 1949; Royal Eijsbouts 2001	
	Basilica of Our Lady of Kortenbos	Sint-Truiden	27	2,365	5,214	5,252	11,579	—N/a	Michiels 1947–53	
	Saint Rumolds Church	Steenokkerzeel	49	1,416	3,122	7,185	15,840	—N/a	Tordeur 1626; Vanden Gheyn 1734–85; Van Aerschodt 1877; Royal Eijsbouts 1980	
	Temse City Hall	Temse	38	509	1,122	3,076	6,781	—N/a	Paccard 1976; Perner 2009; Royal Eijsbouts 2015	
	Belfry of Tielt	Tielt	35	105	231	831	1,832	Up 9 semitones	Dumery 1772–1827	
	Saint Germain's Church	Tienen	54	1,529	3,371	7,071	15,589	—N/a	Witlockx 1714–17; Van Aerschodt 1886; Michiels 1960–61; Petit & Fritsen 1963–64	
	Basilica of Our Lady	Tongeren	49	1,593	3,512	10,384	22,893	(Range not available); Up 2 semitones	Bernard 1677–87; Grongnart 1703; Simon 1782; Chaudoir 1783; Michiels 1913; Sergeys 1958–63; Royal Eijsbouts 2000	
	Saint Peter's Church	Turnhout	50	1,105	2,436	4,325	9,535	—N/a	Dumery 1752; Vanden Gheyn 1767–75; Grognart 1924; Royal Eijsbouts 1980	
	Saint Nicholas Church	Veurne	48	1,794	3,955	9,185	20,249	—N/a	Michiels 1955–60	
	Saint Amand's Church	Wingene	49	738	1,627	4,189	9,235	Up 8 semitones	Van Aerschodt 1856–57; Michaux 1923–25; Michiels 1937; Royal Eijsbouts 2011	
	Ypres Cloth Hall	Ypres	49	2,494	5,498	11,892	26,217	Up 2 semitones	Michiels 1934; Petit & Fritsen 1962	
	Church of Our Lady of the Ascension	Zottegem	49	1,338	2,950	6,828	15,053	Up 3 semitones	Dumery 1750; Van Aerschodt 1867; Michaux 1925; Petit & Fritsen 1963	
	St. Leonard's Church	Zoutleeuw	39	140	310	1,225	2,701	—N/a	Horacantus 1963	

== Wallonia ==
The Walloon Carillon Association maintains a registry of carillons in the Walloon Region. According to the organization, there are 22 carillons located in Wallonia. They are distributed across 20 different cities; three are within the same city – Liège. The carillons have a wide range in total weights, with bourdons spanning between 30 and 4,070 kilograms (66 and 8,973 lb). They also span a wide range of notes, from 25 up to 55. Many carillons were constructed over several centuries by several bellfounders; a minority are constructed entirely by a single bellfounder. The majority of carillons are transposing instruments, and often transpose such that the lowest note on the keyboard is B♭ or C.

List of carillons in Wallonia
Location	City	Bells	Bourdon weight		Total weight		Range and transposition	Bellfounder(s)	Ref.
Location	City	Bells	kg	lb	kg	lb	Range and transposition	Bellfounder(s)	Ref.
St. Julian's Church	Ath	49	4,070	8,970	11,053	24,368	Up 4 semitones	Michiels 1952–54; Petit & Fritsen 1981–2000	
St. Gaugericus' Church	Braine-le-Comte	47	805	1,775	4,370	9,630	Up 6 semitones	Petit & Fritsen 1967	
Belfry of Charleroi	Charleroi	47	3,000	6,600	—N/a		Up 12 semitones	Michiels 1936	
Cathedral of Saints Peter and Paul	Chimay	26	30	66	—N/a		Up 26 semitones	Dumery 1755–63	
Notre Dame de Dinant	Dinant	50	260	570	1,951	4,301	Up 24 semitones	Royal Eijsbouts 2008–14	
St. Nicolas Church	Enghien	51	2,750	6,060	—N/a		Up 5 semitones	Waghevens 1512; Dumery 1754–57; Vanden Gheyn 1798; Michiels 1952–55	
Church of the Ascension	Florenville	49	765	1,687	—N/a		Up 10 semitones	Michiels 1955	
Belfry of Gembloux	Gembloux	50	560	1,230	—N/a		Up 10 semitones	Petit & Fritsen 1963–2013; Voegelé 2012	
Collegiate Church of Our Lady of Huy	Huy	49	—N/a		—N/a		Up 6 semitones	Bodri 1601; Hemony 1661; Vanden Gheyn 1757; Van Aerschodt 1872; Royal Eijsbouts 1968	
St. Joseph's Church	La Louvière	47	300	660	—N/a		Up 24 semitones	Michiels 1957–58	
Liège Cathedral	Liège	49	4,581	10,099	—N/a		Up 15 semitones	De Roesbeke 1315–40; Vanden Gheyn 1754; Van Aerschodt 1854; Causard 1881; Sergeys 1976	
Church of Saint John the Evangelist	Liège	34	570	1,260	—N/a		—N/a	Plumere/Le Vache 1717; Le Vache 1726; Gillett & Johnston 1930–31	
Collegiate Church of St. Bartholomew	Liège	50	380	840	—N/a		(Range not available); Up 10 semitones	Vanden Gheyn 1774	
Cathedral of Saints Peter and Paul	Malmedy	40	400	880	—N/a		Up 10 semitones	Legros 1782–83; Van Aerschodt 1892; Michiels 1952	
Belfry of Mons	Mons	49	5,500	12,100	—N/a		Down 3 semitones	De la Paix 1673; Barbieux 1714; Drouot 1820; Van Aerschodt 1911; Michiels 1934; Sergeys 1980	
St Aubin's Cathedral	Namur	47	2,600	5,700	—N/a		Up 14 semitones	Vanden Gheyn 1780; Van Aerschodt 1858; Slegers-Causard 1930–52; Paccard 1981	
Collegiate Church of Saint Gertrude	Nivelles	47	3,200	7,100	—N/a		Down 3 semitones	Van Aerschodt 1862–1926; Sergeys 1979–80; Paccard n.d.	
Collegiate Church of St. Vincent	Soignies	47 (Note: There is one additional bell not part of the carillon.)	967	2,132	—N/a		Up 14 semitones	Petit & Fritsen 1963–64	
Belfry of Thuin	Thuin	25	335	739	—N/a		Up 23 semitones	Slegers-Causard 1936; Michiels 1939; Voegelé 2003–04	
Belfry of Tournai	Tournai	55	5,000	11,000	—N/a		Up 12 semitones	De Croisilles 1392; Waghevens 1554; Barbieux 1744–55; Van Aerschodt 1873; Michiels 1960–61; Royal Eijsbouts 2004	
Church of Our Lady of the Récollets	Verviers	40	595	1,312	—N/a		Up 20 semitones	Michiels 1937	
Saint John the Baptist Church, Wavre	Wavre	50	1,820	4,010	—N/a		Up 19 semitones	Michiels 1951–53; Royal Eijsbouts 2003	

== See also ==
- Belfries of Belgium and France
