= Matthias Vanden Gheyn =

Flemish carillonneur and organist (1721–1785)

- Born: 7 April 1721; Tienen, Flanders
- Died: 22 June 1785 (aged 64); Leuven, Flanders
- Occupations: Carillonneur; organist
- Years active: 1741–1785
- Era: Baroque; Classical
- Known for: 11 preludes for carillon
- Works: § Musical works
- Children: 17
- Relatives: Vanden Gheyn family

Signature
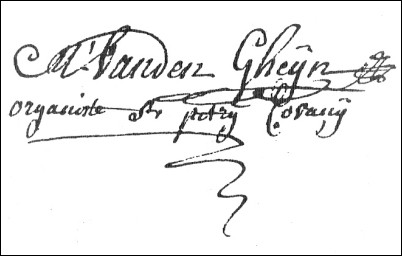

Matthias Vanden Gheyn (Dutch: Matthijs Vanden Gheÿn or Ghein; 7 April 1721 – 22 June 1785) was a Flemish musician from the Baroque/Classical transition period. He is a descendant of the famous bell founding family of the same name. During his life, Vanden Gheyn was considered an outstanding virtuoso of the carillon and organ. He is most famous for composing eleven preludes for carillon, which have become standard repertoire among carillonneurs worldwide since the early 1900s. His spot in history was earned in large part due to the tireless research of his biographer Xavier-Victor-Fidèle van Elewyck, a law and music scholar who considered Vanden Gheyn to be the greatest musician of the Southern Netherlands in the 18th century.

== Biography ==
Matthias Vanden Gheyn was born in Tienen, Austrian Netherlands (now Belgium) into a celebrated family of Flemish bell founders, which in the context of bellfounding, first appeared in Mechelen in 1506, and continued into the 19th century and beyond through the foundry activities of the Van Aerschodt and Sergeys families. He was the oldest son of André-François II Van den Gheyn, the head of the family foundry at the time. In 1725, André-François II was commissioned by the city council of Leuven to cast a new city carillon to be installed in St. Peter's Church. He cast the small bells in Tienen and moved to Leuven in 1727 to cast the three largest bells there. The carillon was completed in 1728.

André-François II died in 1731, and his brother came to Leuven to take over the family foundry. As early as 1732, Matthias began helping his uncle with bell founding. In 1738, the pair cast the bells for the carillon of Nijmegen and earlier the carillon for Veere in 1734/35. It was likely that Matthias was intended to succeed his father as the family bell founder; however, in 1739, he chose to pursue a career in music, leaving the succession of the family business to his younger brother, Andreas Jozef.

Vanden Gheyn's musical talents were clear from an early age. At 14, he taught Mattheus van Frachem, the son of the sexton of Steenokkerzeel, to play the carillon. He likely received his first formal musical education from Abbé Dieudonné Raick, then organist at St. Peter's Church. He replaced his teacher in that post in 1741 at just 20 years old.

Four years later, in June 1745, Karel Peeters, who as Leuven's city carillonist played the St. Peter's Church carillon, died. The city council appealed via the Gazette van Antwerpen for all interested parties to present themselves for the vacant position. On 1 July, Vanden Gheyn and four other applicants met before a jury of prominent musicians and scholars. The jury selected a set of works to be performed on the carillon and judged each of the performances in a blind audition. Vanden Gheyn was last to perform, facing against two organists from Leuven, a carillonist from Soignies, and a carillonist from Dendermonde. The jury stated that Vanden Gheyn "had excelled considerably above the others." He was declared the victor and new Leuven city carillonist in front of the a crowd assembled in the Grand-Market Square and in the surrounding streets, the entire magistrate of the city gathered in an official session, and several famous musicians of the time. He was 24 years old. He remained in Leuven in charge of the organ and carillon until his death 40 years later.

Contemporaries relate how Vanden Gheyn, in an immaculate, fashionable black suit, stylishly holding his walking stick and affably greeting friends and admirers, scanned the market to see if there were perhaps strangers who had come to listen to his renowned carillon playing. After twenty minutes he disappeared into the tower of St Peter's where he discarded the fashionable clothing and thereupon opened his concert with a number of preludes. That was only the introduction however, as time and again, the highpoint was in the form of his very original improvisations which could last for half an hour. Vanden Gheyn knew very well that this unrestricted playing was of an exceptional character, as afterwards he appeared once more among his admirers to accept their compliments, dressed in just as immaculate a suit as before the concert.

— André Lehr, The Art of Carillon in the Low Countries (1991), p. 196

The post of city carillonist came with a modest salary and commissions. Vanden Gheyn was required to play the carillon each Sunday, on all regular festivals of the church, on municipal feast days, and for any other occasion the city saw fit. In addition, he was expected to maintain the musical quality of the flawed carillon at his own expense. The city initially included a stipulation to retune the carillon's bells, though he protested successfully to have it removed from his contract. Vanden Gheyn acted as advisor in projects of organ and carillon building and composed music for carillon, organ and harpsichord. In 1772, he served on the jury to appoint the new city carillonist of Mechelen in the same style of blind audition that netted him his own position in Leuven. At least three of his works were published during his lifetime (see § Musical works). He was also active as a pedagogue, judging by two treatises he wrote about the basso-continuo practice. The first dates from c. 1760 and was published in Leuven; the second dates from 1783 and is preserved in manuscript. His wife Anna Catharina Lints, with whom he had 17 children, ran a cloth shop in Brusselsestraat.

Vanden Gheyn remained organist of St. Peter’s and city carillonist of Leuven until his death in 1785. Days later, the following obituary appeared in the Leuven weekly news: "Mr. Mathias [sic] vanden Gheyn very notorious Carillonneur of this City, and Organist of St. Peter's Church and Chapter House, very noted for his music publications for both Organ and Carillon, has died on Wednesday the 22nd of this month."

His son Joost Thomas succeeded him in 1785 as the Leuven city carillonist. He lived in dissatisfaction with the city council and resigned in 1821. Some of the descendants of Vanden Gheyn held important positions in social, religious and academic walks of life in Leuven, Ghent and Brussels in the 19th and 20th centuries. For example, his great-grandson Gabriel Vanden Gheyn was canon and housekeeper of St Bavo's Cathedral in Ghent. He was a key witness in the case of the 1934 theft of the panel The Just Judges by the Van Eyck brothers.

== Legacy ==
As with many composers, Vanden Gheyn's musical contributions were rediscovered long after his death. The rediscovery was made solely by Xavier-Victor-Fidèle van Elewyck (1825–1888), an ardent music lover who had studied law at the University of Leuven and remained in the city.

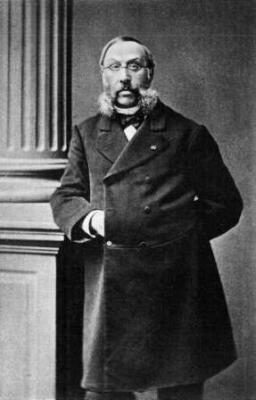
Photograph of Xavier-Victor-Fidèle van Elewyck (1825–1888), the biographer of Vanden Gheyn

In 1860, Van Elewyck began researching the sacred music in the Southern Netherlands in the 17th and 18th centuries. During lectures, he learned from older choir members of St. Peter's Church about the virtuoso Vanden Gheyn. Van Elewyck's curiosity led him to interview descendants of Vanden Gheyn and older town residents. In seven months, his research recollected important events in Vanden Gheyn's life and identified 51 instrumental compositions from various places. He published a booklet in 1862 titled Matthias van den Gheyn, le plus grand Organiste et Carillonneur belge du XVIIIc siècle, et les célèbres fondeurs de cloches de ce nom depuis 1450 jusqu' à nos jours [Matthias van den Gheyn, the Greatest Belgian Organist and Carillonist of the 18th century, and the famous bell founders of this name from 1450 to the present day]. As the title suggests, in this study he exalts Vanden Gheyn to the greatest musician known to the Southern Netherlands in the 18th century. He paid particular attention to the eleven preludes for carillon, which he discovered in two manuscripts. He considered one of these to be the original written by Vanden Gheyn.

Van Elewyck's admiration prompted him to copy most of the works he attributed to Vanden Gheyn. He submitted them to the Royal Conservatory of Brussels and published a great deal in 1877. By then, the number of works he attributed to Vanden Gheyn grew to 100. Thanks to the tireless work of Van Elewyck, the reputation of Vanden Gheyn began to resonate in his hometown. When between 1851 and 1904 the Leuven Town Hall was filled with statues of famous persons from Leuven, Brabant and Belgium, a niche was reserved for Vanden Gheyn. He is the only musician to adorn the façade. Without Van Elewyck's persistent research, Matthias Vanden Gheyn would only be a footnote in music history and most of his musical works would undoubtedly have been lost.

The legacy of Vanden Gheyn's music rests mainly in his eleven carillon preludes. They represent a rare insight into the carillon music of the 18th century, an era from which few manuscripts have been preserved. Although some of the preludes were published by Van Elewyck, these editions contained many errors, which were not properly corrected until the holograph (clearly written in Vanden Gheyn's own script) was discovered in 1995. Vanden Gheyn's carillon preludes have been part of the standard repertoire since the early 1900s. Staf Nees famously nicknamed Vanden Gheyn "the Bach of the carillon".

== Musical style ==
Matthias Vanden Gheyn's works are typical of keyboard music from the transitional period between Baroque and Classical styles (c. 1730–1760), a time in which composers sought dramatic effects, striking melodies, and clearer textures. His compositions draw many similarities to those of George Frideric Handel. His eleven carillon preludes interweave effects idiomatic to bells, such as rapid chromatic passages, appropriate use of the heavier bells, and broken-chord structures in alternating hands. Vanden Gheyn was well aware of taking advantage of the inherent inner harmonic qualities of the carillon, most notably the prominent minor third overtone: the diminished seventh chord (a stack of three minor third intervals) appears in every one of his carillon preludes. Several of his harpsichord and organ compositions were printed in his lifetime, along with a treatise on basso continuo. In addition, many compositions for harpsichord, organ, and carillon and a second treatise on harmony remain in manuscript.

== Musical works ==
There are at least 100 known works by Matthias Vanden Gheyn. At least three had been published in his lifetime, and many have been published posthumously in collections. A carillon manuscript from 1756 entitled Leuvens Beiaardhandschrift ('Leuven's carillon manuscript'), was probably supervised by Vanden Gheyn. It contains 151 pieces of dance music, marches and music for formal occasions. The following is a list of the 51 works attributed by Van Elewyck to Vanden Gheyn between 1860 and 1862. Due to the uncertainty in the date of each work, the list is organized in the order in which they were discovered.

A carillonneur plays Vanden Gheyn's Preludio IX at St. Rumbold's Cathedral in Mechelen, Belgium

- Foundations of the basso continuo (two lessons and twelve small sonatas for violin and basso continuo) (1764)
- Collection of 12 sonatas for organ/harpsichord and violin
- Fugue in E natural minor for organ
- A fugue preceded by two subjects worked in imitation, entitled fugues
- Runaway in A major for carillon
- Runaway in G major for carillon
- Five sonatas, part of a collection of six harpsichord sonatas
- Allegro or fuguette in G major for carillon
- Eleven famous preludes for carillon, followed by a few small tunes, minuets, steps, etc.
  - Preludio I (in G major)
  - Preludio II (in C major)
  - Preludio III (in C major)
  - Preludio IV (in D minor)
  - Preludio V (in D minor)
  - Preludio VI (in G minor)
  - Preludio VII (in G major)
  - Preludio VIII (in A minor)
  - Preludio IX (in F major)
  - Preludio X (in C major)
  - Preludio Coucou (in C major)
- Rondo in G major and Marche in D major, composed for the carillon of Leuven
- Fugue in F major (1785), signed by Vanden Gheyn
- Prelude for organ, 8th Toni
- Andantino in D minor
- Runaway in G major
- Six harpsichord entertainments
- Second Treatise on Harmony and Composition (1783)
- Fugue in C major

== Bibliography ==
- Rombouts, Luc (2014). "The Bach of the Carillon". Singing Bronze: A History of Carillon Music. Leuven University Press. pp. 109–120. ISBN 9789058679567.
- Lehr, André (1991). The Art of Carillon in the Low Countries. Tielt: Lannoo Printers & Publishers. pp. 82–198. ISBN 9020919172.
- Huybens, Gilbert (1980). "Nota's over het muziekleven te Leuven 1773 – 1805" [Notes on music life in Leuven 1773–1805]. Arca (in Dutch). Vol. 9a. Leuven: De Vrienden van de Leuvense Stedelijke Musea; Peeters. ISBN 9789068310757.
- Rice, William Gorham (1914). Carillons of Belgium and Holland: Tower Music in the Low Countries. New York: J. Lane Co. hdl:2027/uc2.ark:/13960/t5p84727t.
- Gheyn, Matthias van den (1997). Rombouts, Luc; Huybens, Gilbert (eds.). Preludia voor Beiaard / Preludes for Carillon. Leuven: Alamire Music Publishing. ISBN 9068531204.
- Keldermans, Karel; Keldermans, Linda (1996). "The Carillon in Europe". Carillon: The Evolution of a Concert Instrument in North America. Springfield, Illinois: Springfield Park District. pp. 13–14. ISBN 0-9652252-0-8. OL 1024319M.
- Barnes, Ronald, ed. (1962). The Complete Carillon Works of Matthias van den Gheyn (1721-1785). Lawrence, Kansas: editor. hdl:2027/uc1.31210012042832.
