= Belfry of Thuin =

Medieval tower and UNESCO World Heritage Site in Thuin, Belgium

UNESCO World Heritage Site
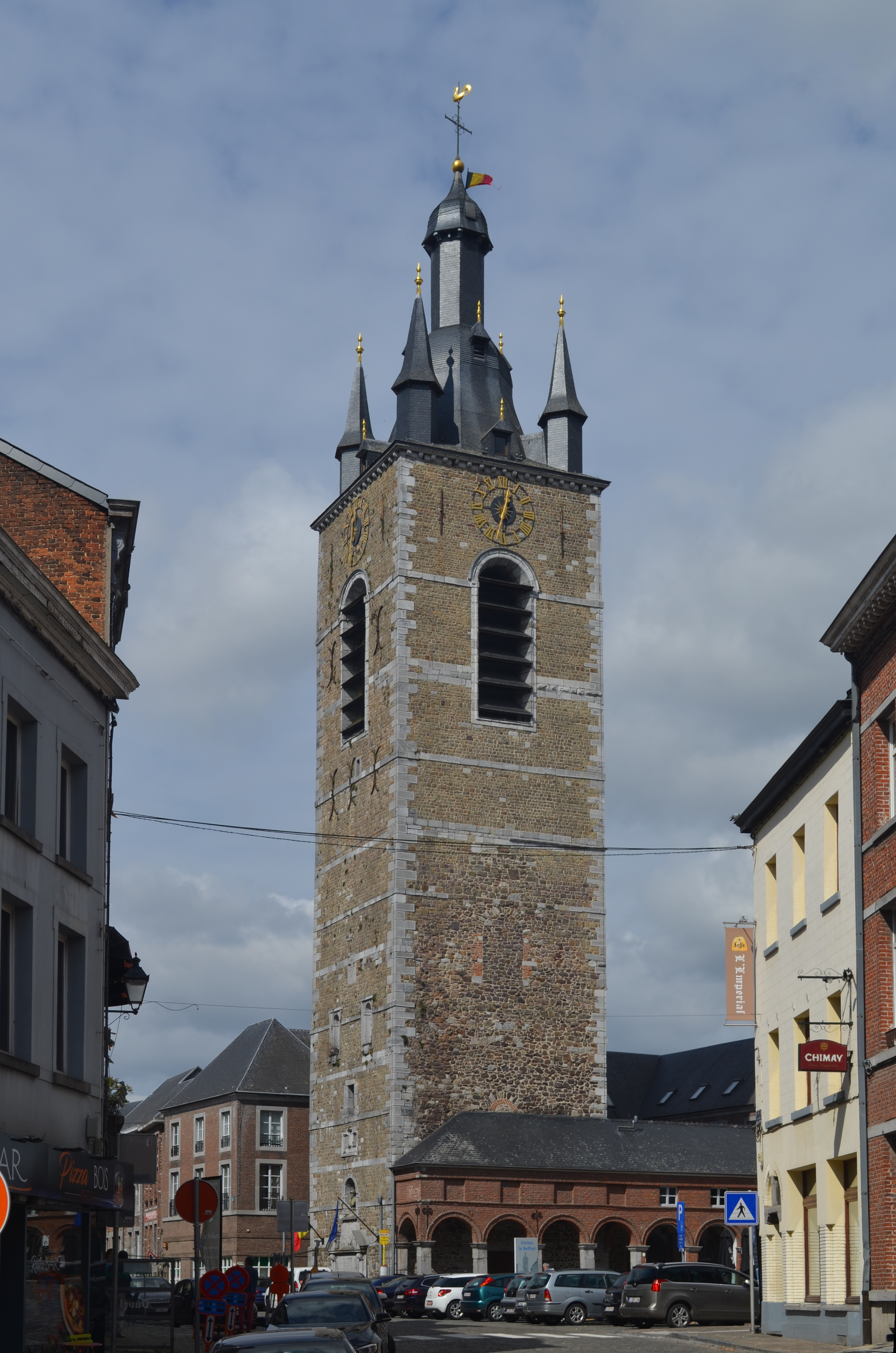
- Belfry of Thuin (east face)

- Location within Belgium
- Location: Thuin, Hainaut, Belgium
- Part of: Belfries of Belgium and France
- Criteria: Cultural: (ii), (iv)
- Reference: 943bis-008
- Inscription: 1999 (23rd Session)
- Extensions: 2005
- Coordinates: 50°20′23″N 4°17′12″E

The Belfry of Thuin (French: Beffroi de Thuin) is a historic building in Thuin, Belgium. Although historically attached to a church, the bell tower has also become a municipal tower, the only belfry of the Principality of Liège. It is one of 56 belfries of Belgium and France that are inscribed on the UNESCO World Heritage List, in recognition of their civic architecture and importance in the rise of municipal power in Europe.

== History ==
The tower of the old church of Saint-Théodard, built without foundations on slate rock, is undeniably medieval and must date from the time of the greatest development of the city. In the period between 1153 and 1164, during his visits to Thuin, the Prince-Bishop Henry II of Leez decided to erect a tower for the church.

This development made it simultaneously a bell tower and a communal tower, and the only belfry of the Principality of Liege. An account from 1641 speaks of "bells berfroy this town" and an agreement reached in 1667 between the Judge, communal power and Chapter indicate that each of them has the right to possess a key to the bell tower.

The excavations undertaken on the site of the Chapter to the late twentieth century, reveal the existence of three successive religious buildings. Probably a Carolingian chapel, a Romanesque church and a Gothic church built in the sixteenth century on the remains of the previous one. At the time of its destruction in 1811, to make room to dance, the nave had a length of 20 meters and a width of 18 meters. It stood to the east of the tower on the south side of the square of the Chapter.

The tower, considered communal property, escaped the confiscation of Church property during the French Revolution, and thus avoid its sale and demolition. However, a 1662 storm completely destroyed the belfry roof. The current boom is the work of Everard, master carpenter in Beaumont, with the help of Andry Dagnelie, carpenter. Jean-Baptiste Chermanne conducts a brief restoration of the exterior siding and major repairs to the college in 1754. The tower was hit by German artillery August 24, 1914, and the damage was permanently repaired in 1952 by Michot carpenters, father and son. The last restoration dates from 2004, when the chime was automated to play hours and half hours.

== Description ==
With a total height of 60 metres (200 ft), the belfry is a square building Baroque style, with a tapered base on three levels with sandstone rubble and limestone harp angles. The facing of the four faces is animated by banners and horizontal chains in limestone, increasingly spaced to the summit. These bands sometimes use reused materials such as stone fragments bosses or bearing inscriptions.

The tower is topped by a bell-arrow between four polygonal turrets. The cavetto cornice is supported by modillions in quarter-round. The upper level is illuminated four large semicircular openings lined with strip under supervision archivolt. The face is the tower bears the traces of the missing ship. Until mid-height, it has a seating area rubble grossly limited by the trace of crawling of the roof of the vessel. This part was once pierced by three superimposed arched windows, a door on the ground floor.

On the bottom of the south face are sealed the arms of Peter the Tassier and Nicolas Brussels mayors in 1638–1639, during the work undertaken on the tourn. Below are two empty niches that were to be those of St. Lambert and St. Théodard. Underneath is a cartridge containing three crowns eroded underlined dedication of an erased and a smaller cartridge marked "Thuin 1638".

The west side has a timetable of John the Baptist Chermanne tailor the key to Ouverturen. Against the north side is a semicircular staircase tower covered with slate pepperpot, giving access to the second level.

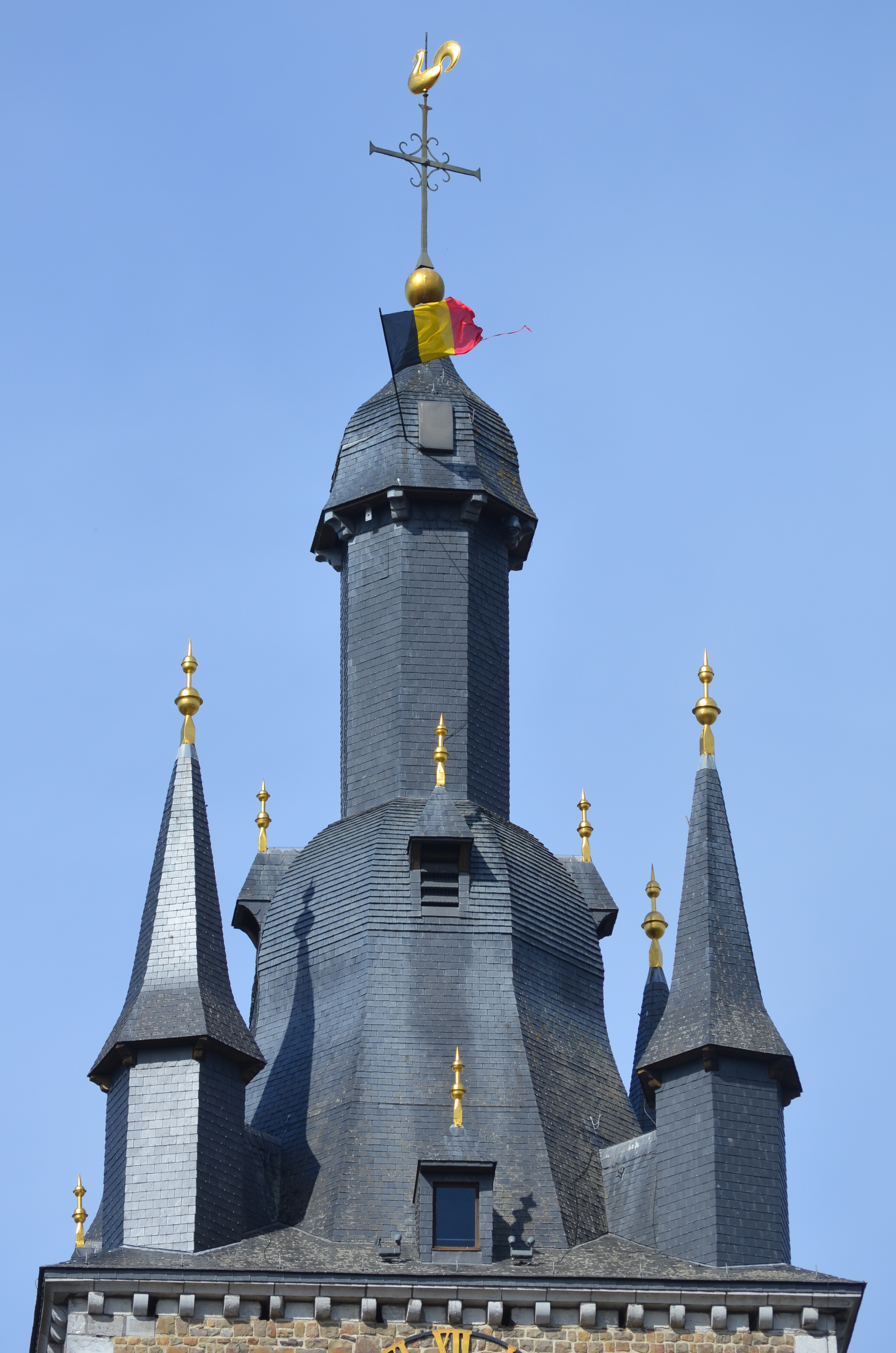
Bell-arrow between four polygonal turrets

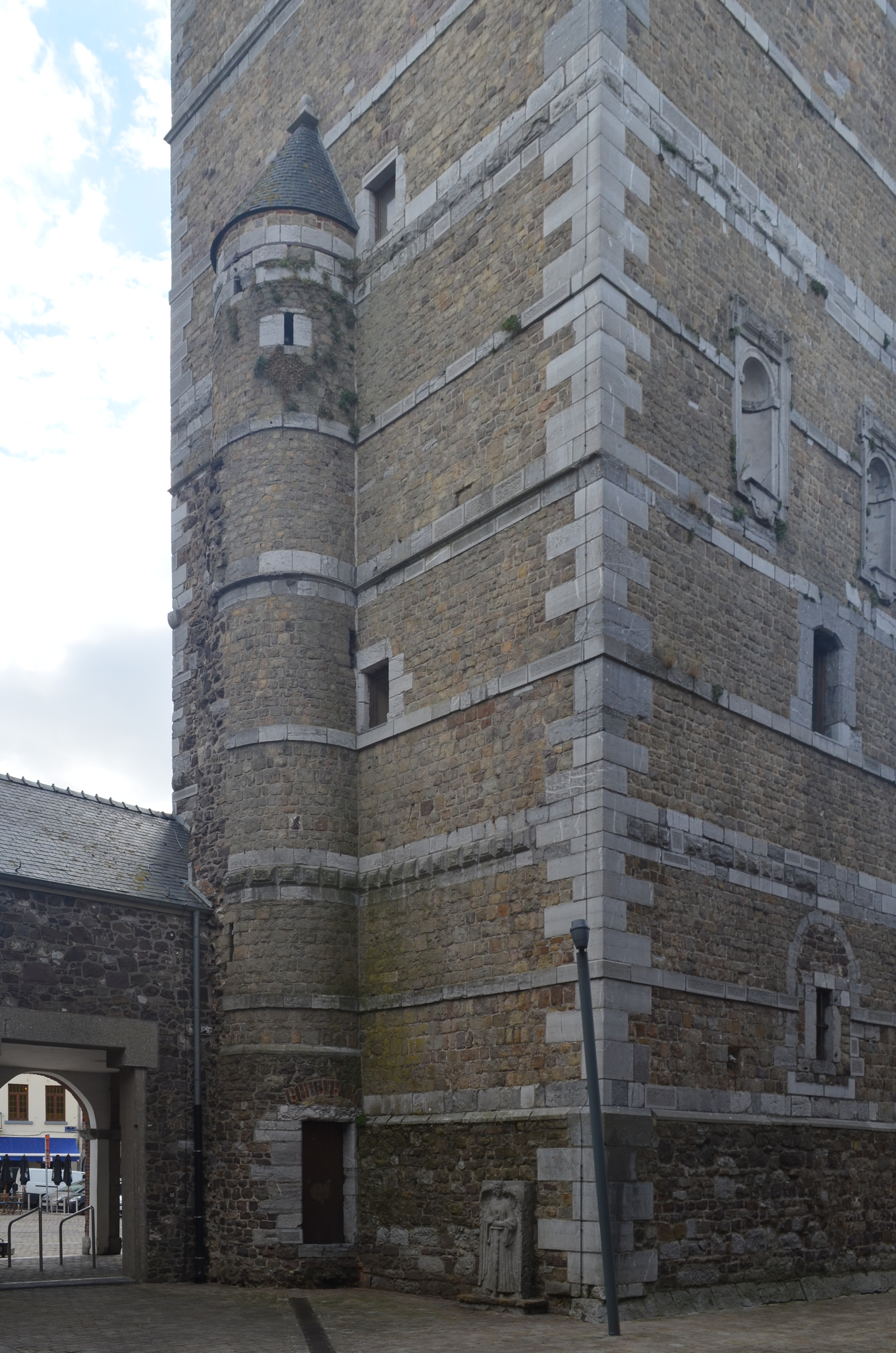
North face

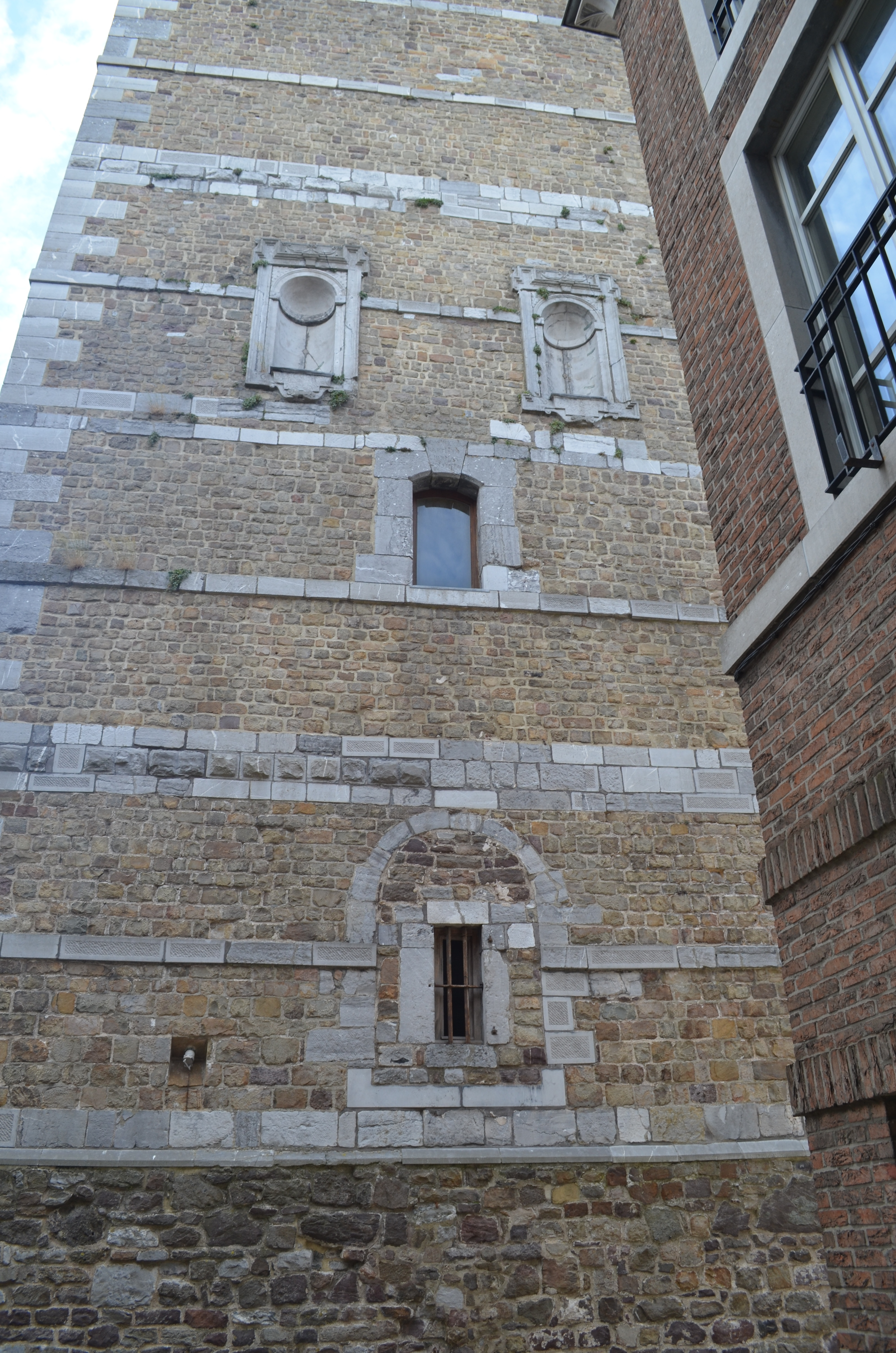
West face

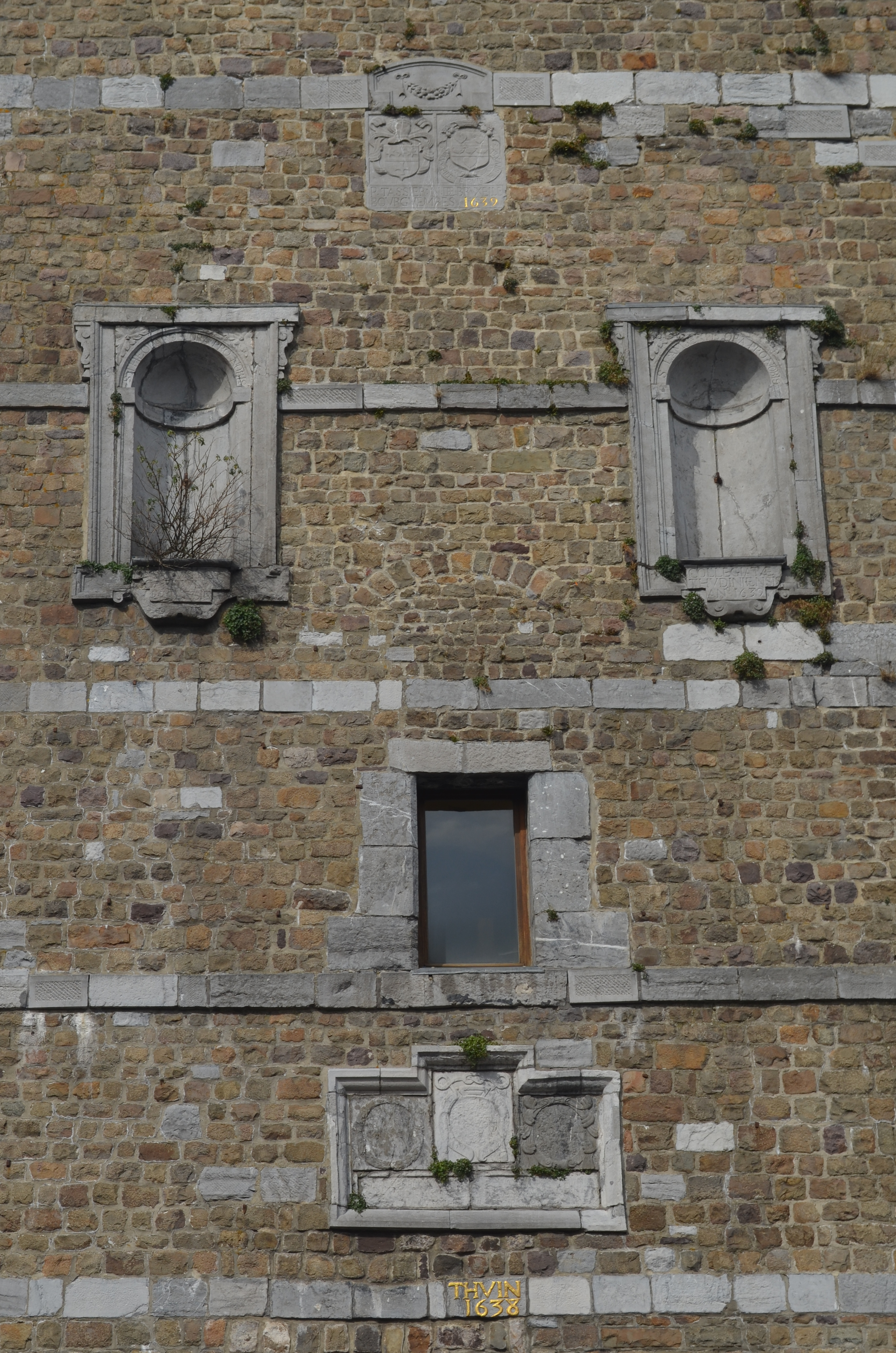
South face

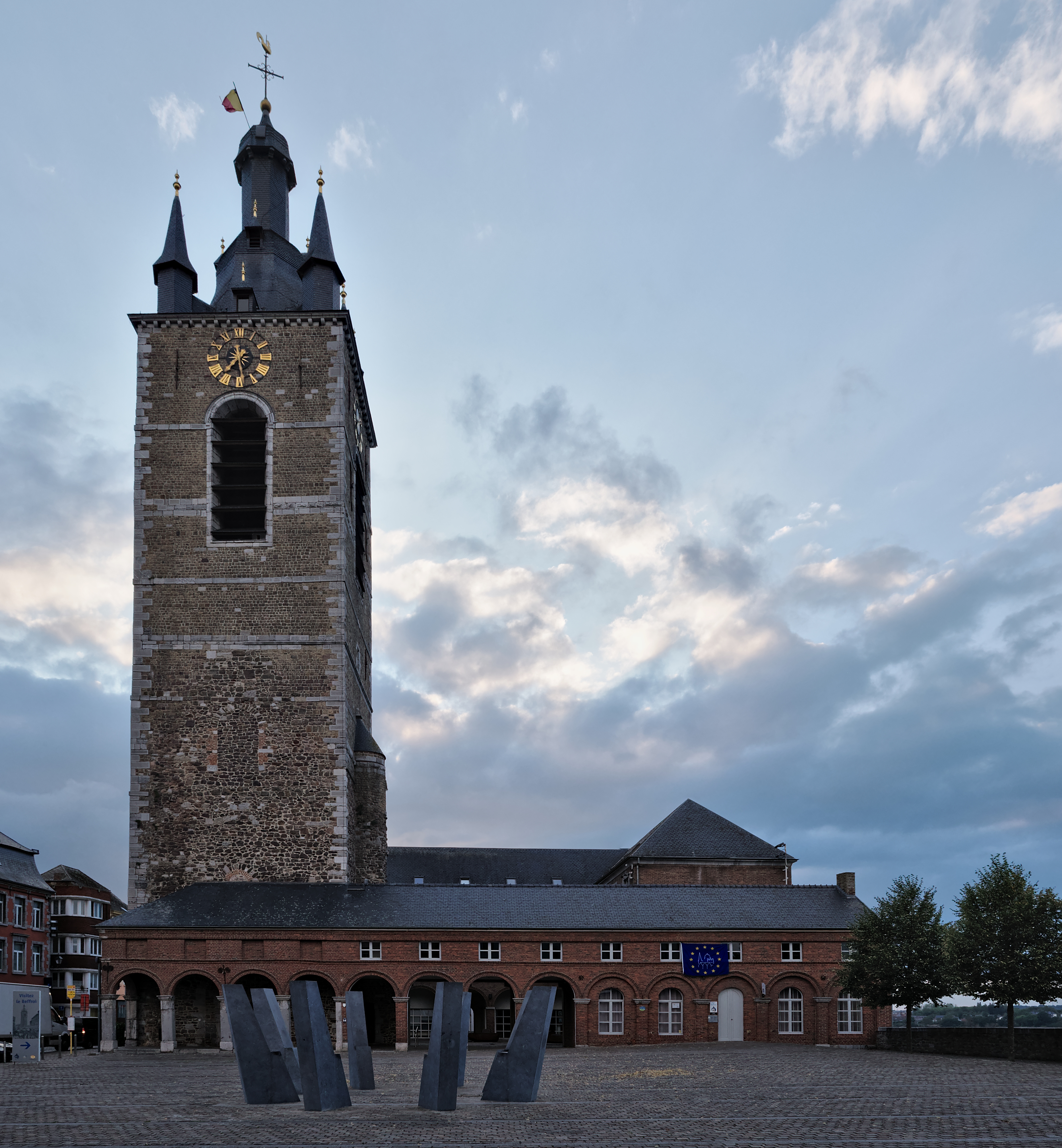
East face

== Carillon ==
In 1765, the belfry had four large bells. These were recast at the initiative of the Magistrate, that which provoked a conflict between it and the Chapter of the Collegiate who refused to share the cost. The Magistrate had to bear alone the cost of which the melting commissioned in 1763 to Levache and in 1765 and 1766 to Monaux Pierre Givet. The two bells cast by Monaux are still in the belfry. This is Paula, 1765, and Maria, melted in 1766.

== See also ==
- List of carillons in Belgium
