= Gli orti esperidi =

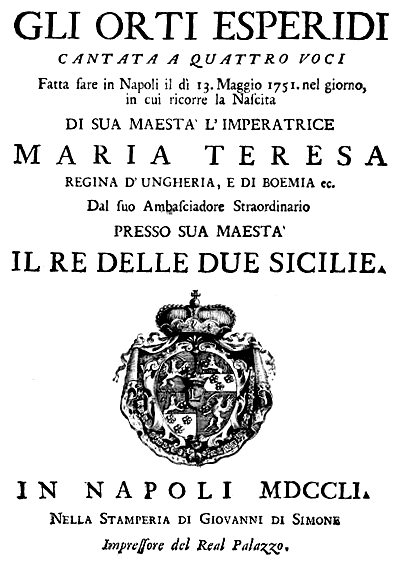
libretto to the setting by Nicola Conforto

Gli orti esperidi (The Gardens of the Hesperides) is a libretto by Metastasio set first in 1721 by Nicola Porpora, and performed 28 August 1721, at the Palazzo Reale. In 1751 Nicola Conforto set the libretto in honor of the Empress Maria Theresa of Austria, to celebrate the name day of the Spanish king Ferdinand VI on 30 May.
