= Franz Christoph Neubauer =

German composer and violinist

Franz Christoph Neubauer (c. 1760 - 11 October 1795) was a German composer and violinist of Bohemian origins, possibly born in Hořín near Mělník. He died in Bückeburg.
