= Ypres Cloth Hall =

Medieval commercial building in Ypres, Belgium

- Lakenhal or Lakenhalle
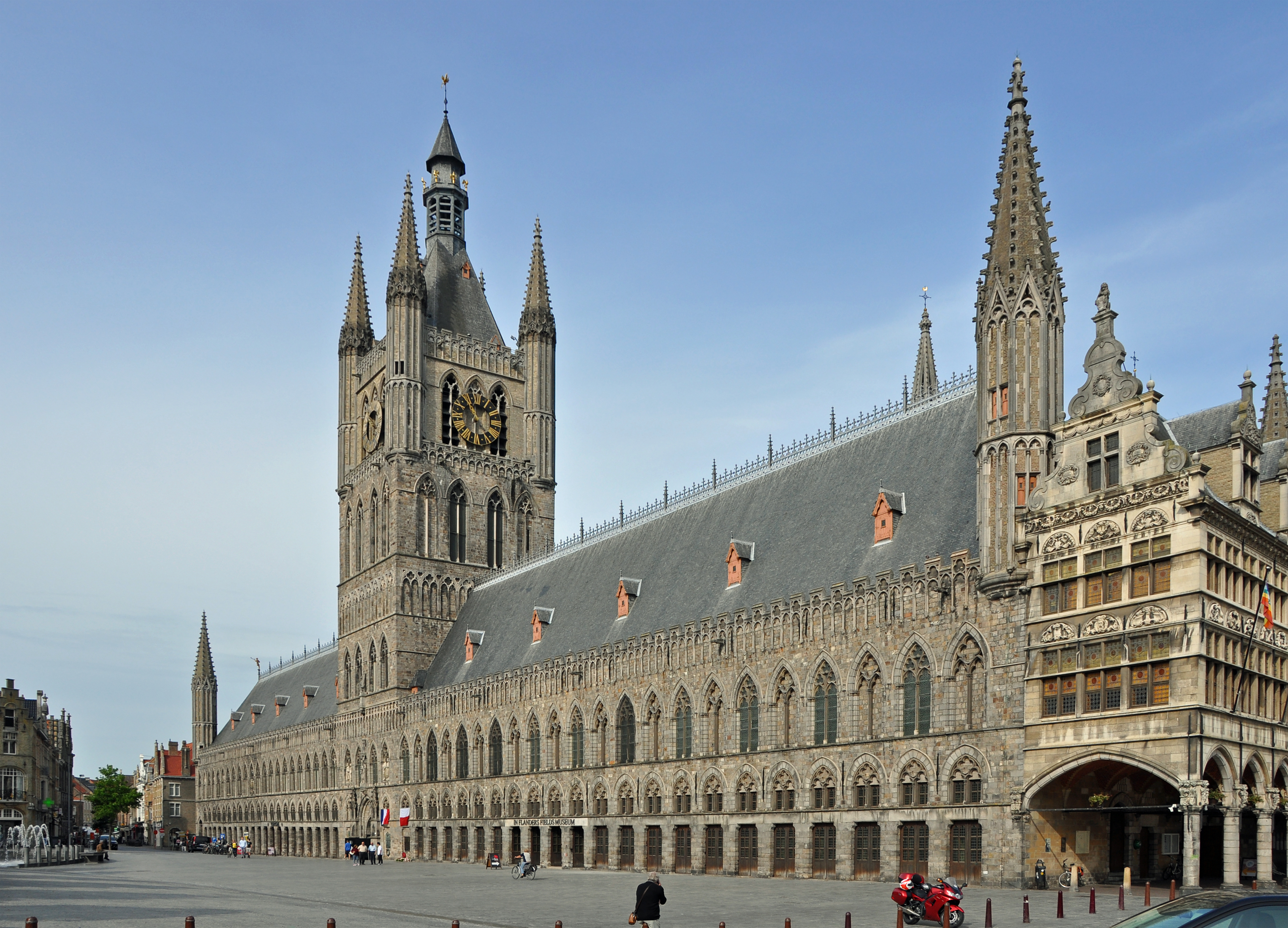
- Ypres Cloth Hall seen from the Grote Markt

- Location within Belgium

General information
- Architectural style: Gothic
- Location: Ypres, West Flanders, Belgium
- Coordinates: 50.8512°N 2.8858°E
- Construction started: 13th century
- Estimated completion: 1304
- Renovated: 1933–1967

Height
- Height: 70 m (230 ft)

Design and construction
- Architects: Jules Coomans and P. A. Pauwels

Other information
- Parking: On site

Website
- trabel.com/ieper-clothhall (archived 13 May 2006)

The Cloth Hall (Dutch: Lakenhal or Lakenhalle) is a large cloth hall, a medieval commercial building, in Ypres, Belgium. The original structure was erected mainly between 1200 and 1304, in the Gothic style. It was one of the largest commercial buildings of the Middle Ages, when it served as the main market and warehouse for the Flemish city's prosperous cloth industry. At 125 metres (410 ft) in breadth, with a 70-metre-high (230 ft) belfry tower, it recalls the importance and wealth of the medieval trade city.

The hall lay in ruins after artillery fire devastated Ypres in World War I. Between 1933 and 1967, it was meticulously reconstructed to its prewar condition, under the guidance of architects J. Coomans and P. A. Pauwels. The building now houses the In Flanders Fields Museum. In 1999, it was inscribed on the UNESCO World Heritage List as part of the Belfries of Belgium and France site, in recognition of their unique architecture, role in the advancement of civil liberties, and their civic, not religious, influence.

== History ==
=== Medieval structure ===
The original Cloth Hall was built between about 1200 and 1304. The belfry was started in 1200, while the market hall was started in 1230. In 1304, the ensemble was completed. Because the majority of the building was constructed in one go in the middle of the 13th century, the building as a whole therefore presents a very homogeneous style, in the purest Gothic tradition of that time, the fruit of a single project. It is one of the oldest urban civil monuments north of the Alps, and also one of the largest commercial buildings of the Middle Ages. The decline of the city in subsequent periods had allowed the saving of most of the original building, very well preserved until the First World War, because it did not require any enlargement or very significant modification thereafter, nor any reconstruction in another style.

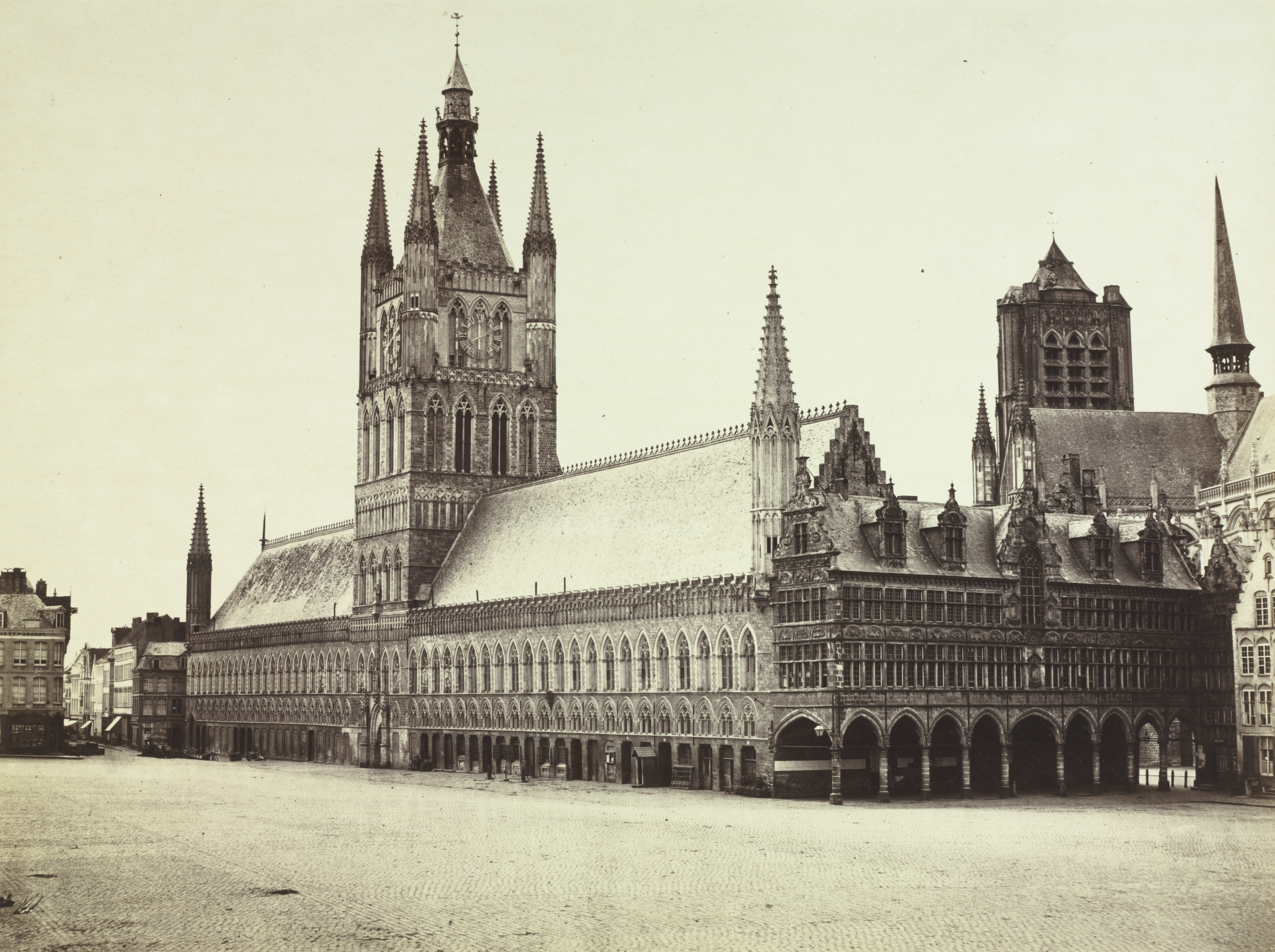
The Cloth Hall c. 1860, showing the original medieval building

=== Destruction and rebuilding ===
The Cloth Hall was almost completely destroyed during the First World War and rebuilt after the conflict. After long debates animated by quarrels between amateurs and experts, the architects, including Jules Coomans, opted for a faithful and rigorous restitution of the building based on surveys carried out before and during the war. The reconstruction of St. Martin's Cathedral, located at the rear, had just been completed when the Cloth Hall's reconstruction began. The current hall is therefore largely an exact replica of the medieval building as it existed before the war. However, some parts of the monument are still original, notably in the western part and at the base of the belfry. Most of the reusable old elements found in the ruins and the rubble were reintegrated into the monument, and they served as a model for the missing elements. Reconstruction work ended in 1967.

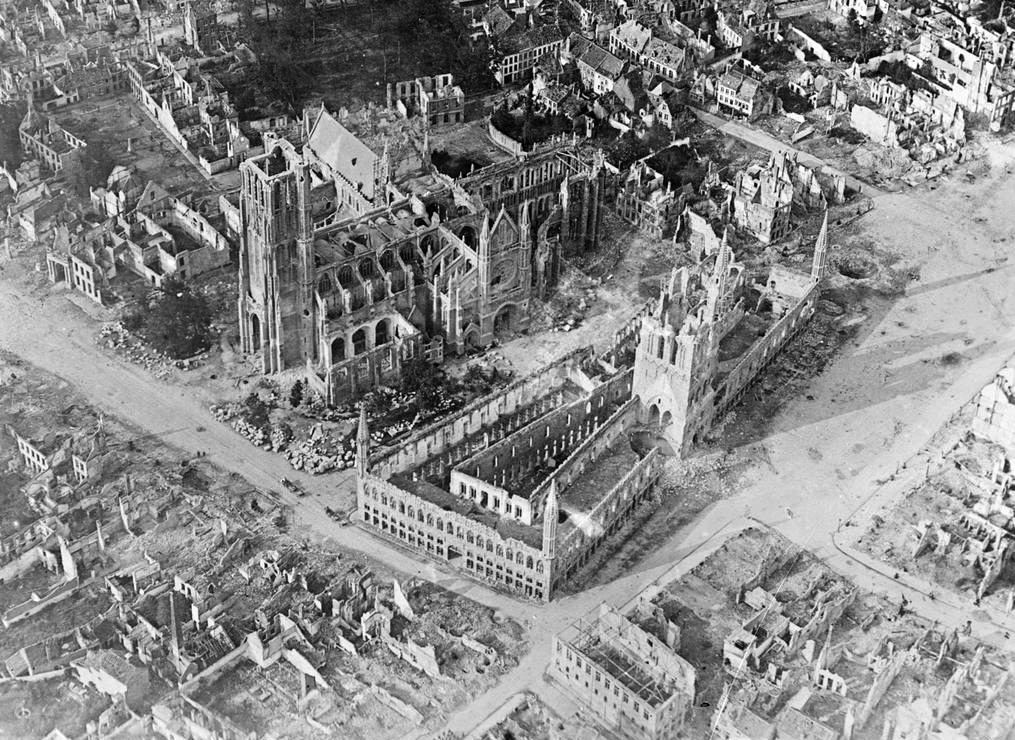
Aerial view during World War I. The destruction is not over at this point.

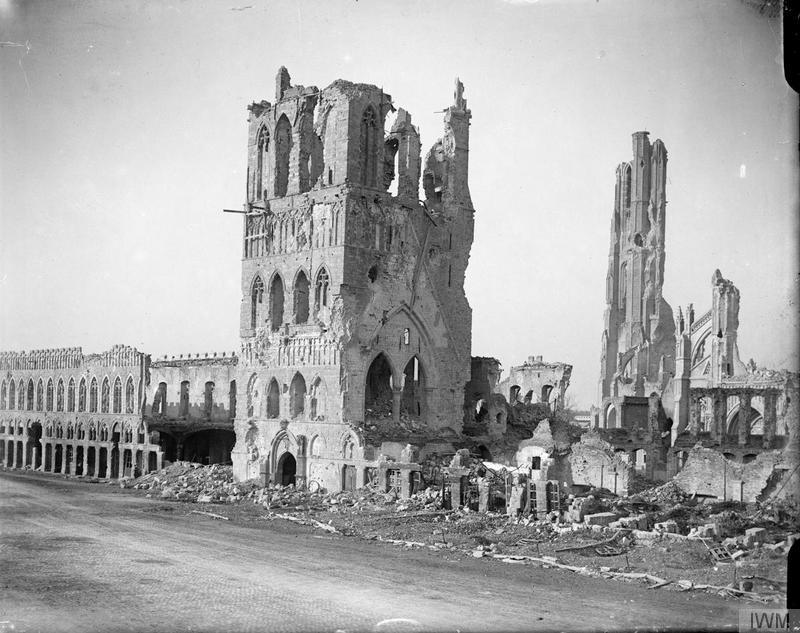
The Cloth Hall in ruins, 22 November 1916

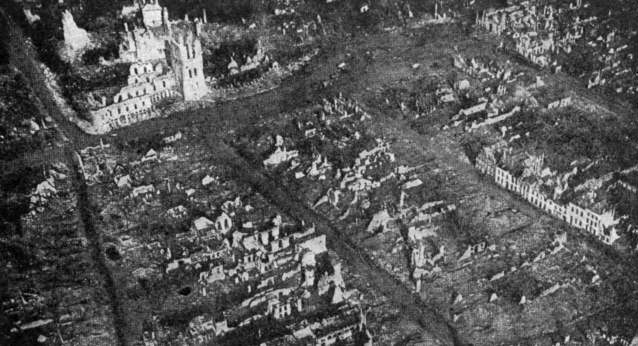
The ruined city centre with the hall and the cathedral at the end of the war

== Building ==
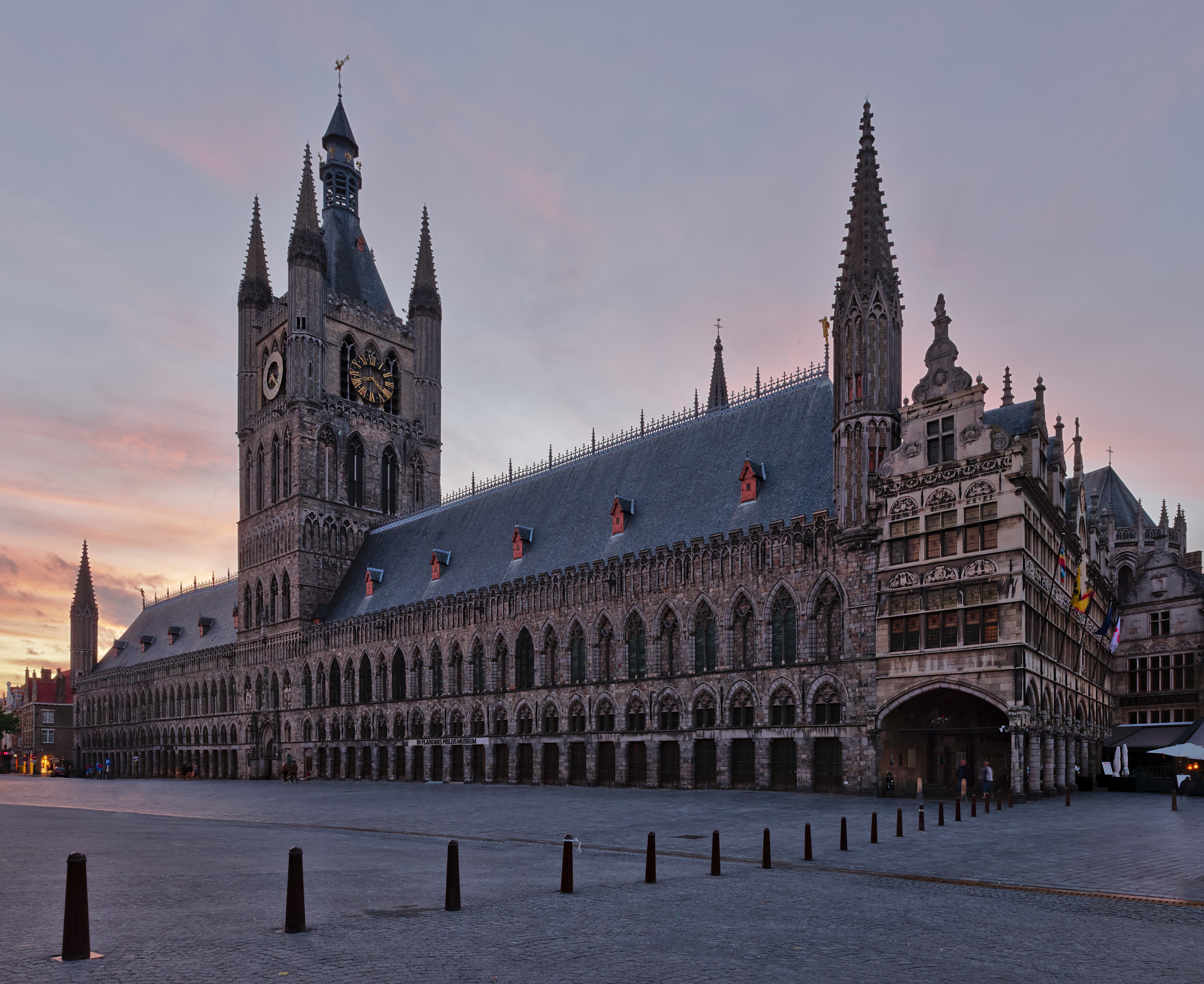
Modern-day view of the reconstructed Cloth Hall

In a row spanning the front of the edifice are tall pointed arches that alternately enclose windows and blind niches. Before World War I, the niches framed life-size statues of historical personages, counts and countesses of Flanders. The niches on the side wings are now mostly vacant, but those in the centre contain statues of Count Baldwin IX of Flanders and Mary of Champagne, legendary founders of the building; and King Albert I and Queen Elisabeth, under whose reign the reconstruction began. Situated between these two couples, directly above the central archway entrance or Donkerpoort, is a statue of Our Lady of Thuyne, the patroness of Ypres.

The belfry, capped with four turrets and a spire, houses a carillon with 49 bells. From a pole atop the spire a gilded dragon overlooks the city. The tower offers an expansive view of the surroundings, and was used as a watchtower in centuries past. It has also accommodated the town archives, a treasury, an armory and a prison. In less enlightened times, cats were thrown off the belfry for reasons that are not clearly understood. One theory is that cats were in some way associated with black magic. A different theory is that cats were held to protect the cloth against mice, but the annual excess of kittens had to be dealt with in some way. Today, a jester commemorates this act by tossing stuffed toy felines from the tower during the triennial Cat Parade.

The Cloth Hall used to be accessible by boat via the Ieperlee waterway, which is now covered. The spacious ground-floor halls where wool and cloth were once sold are now used for exhibitions and tourist information; the second floor, formerly a warehouse, now hosts the In Flanders Fields Museum, dedicated to the history of the Great War and also houses a World War I research centre. Via the museum, visitors can access the belfry tower.

Against the east face of the edifice stands the elegant Nieuwerck, whose Renaissance style contrasts markedly with the Gothic of the main building. Originally built between 1619 and 1622, and reconstructed after the war, this annex now serves as a town hall.

== International significance ==
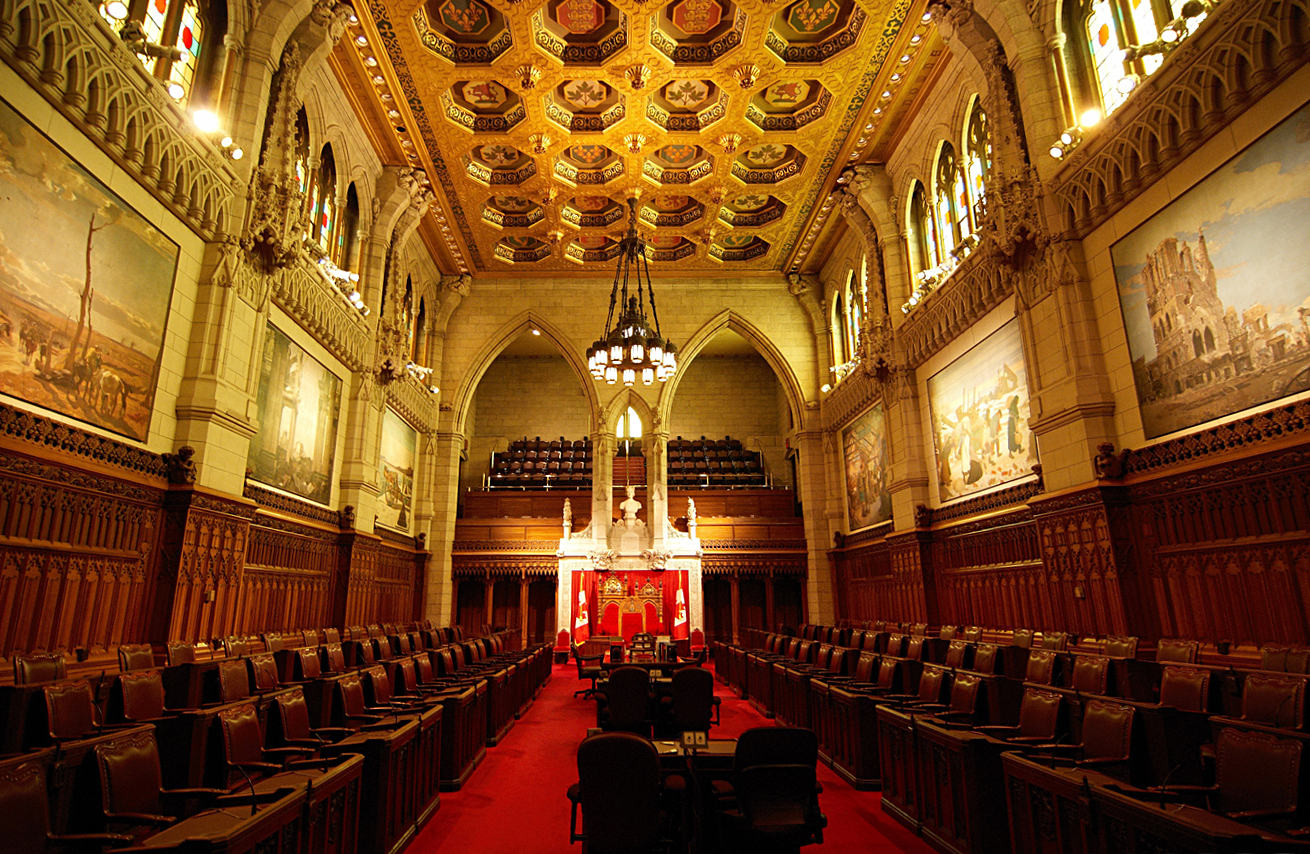
Painting of Ypres Cloth Hall hanging in the Senate Chamber of the Parliament of Canada (right-most painting)

A painting of the Cloth Hall as it appeared in ruins in 1918, by Scottish-born artist James Kerr-Lawson, was one of over 1,000 pieces of art commissioned by the Canadian War Memorials Fund for part of a World War I memorial building that was planned after the war. However, the memorial building was eventually scrapped in favour of a memorial cenotaph at the centre of Confederation Square, across the street from Parliament Hill in Ottawa. The painting of the Cloth Hall, and seven other of the commissioned pieces, were instead hung in the Senate Chamber of the newly re-built Centre Block of parliament in 1921, and remains there today.

The design of the Calcutta High Court building, established on July 1, 1862 in the city of Calcutta (present-day Kolkata) in the Bengal Presidency of India during the British Raj, was inspired by the Ypres Cloth Hall, as were Sir George Gilbert Scott's design for the new main building of Glasgow University in 1870, W H Crossland's design for the Holloway Sanatorium at Virginia Water, Surrey, built 1873–85, and William Henry Lynn's design for Chester Town Hall, built 1865–69.

== See also ==
- Delaware and Hudson Railway Building, a 20th-century copy of the Cloth Hall in Albany, New York, United States
- List of carillons in Belgium
