= Jerónimo de Carrión =

Jerónimo de Carrión (1660–1721) was a Spanish baroque composer.

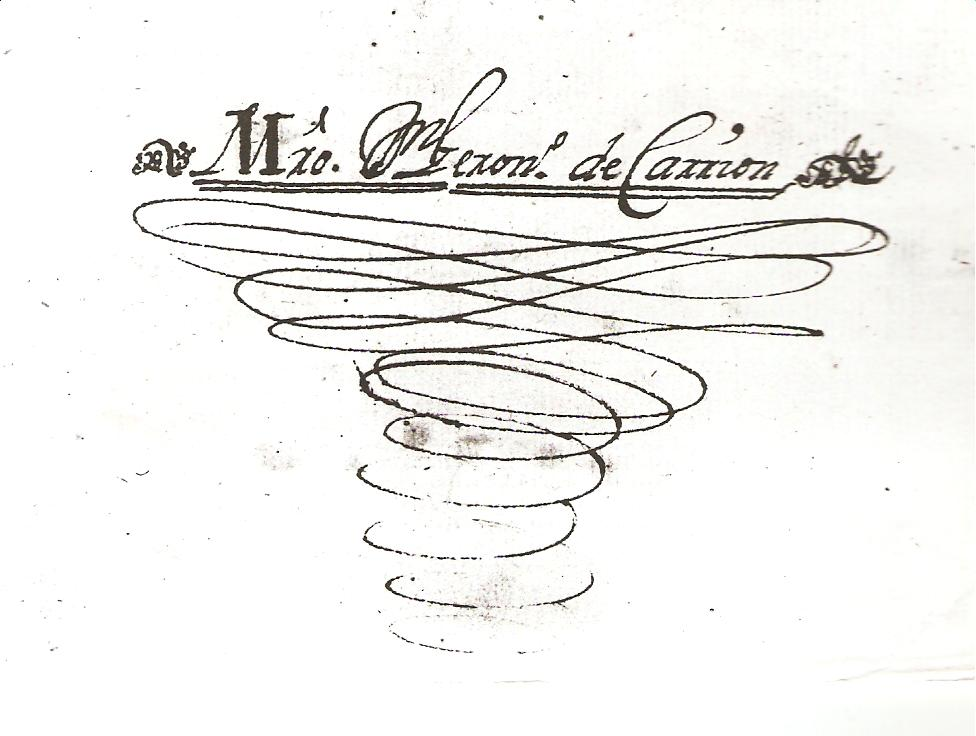
Firma de Jeronimo de Carrión. Fuente: Catedral de Segovia

Carrión was born in Segovia and was a choirboy at Segovia Cathedral. From 1687 to 1690 he was maestro de capilla in Mondoñedo and then, after a year at Ourense, at Segovia Cathedral, taking up the position formerly filled by Miguel de Irízar who had died in 1684; he remained in this post from 1692 to his death in 1721.

== Works ==
- 4 masses
- 28 psalms
- 7 offices for the dead
- 6 magnificats
- 12 lamentations
- 16 motets
- more than 500 villancicos.

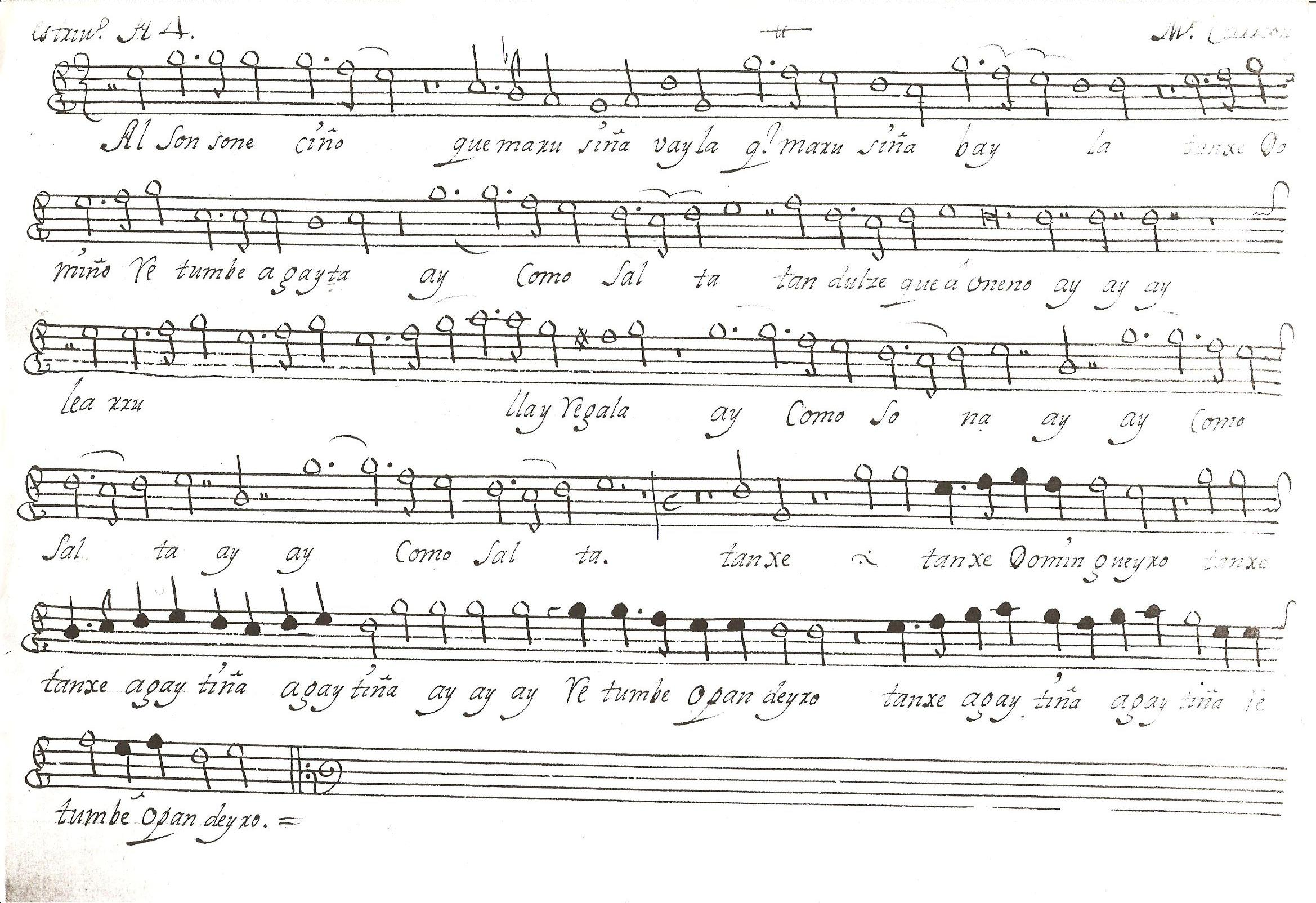
Tiple villancico Jeronimo de Carrión. Fuente: Catedral de Segovia

== Discography ==
- Carrión "Calendas, El Tiempo En Las Catedrales" Tonos al Nacimiento, a La Pasión y al Santísimo. Lamentaciones Del Viernes. Capilla Jerónimo de Carrión dir. Alicia Lázaro. Verso. 2006.
- Carrión "Ah de los elementos" - Misa de batalla. 7 villancicos on Capilla Jerónimo de Carrión dir. Alicia Lázaro. Verso. 2007.
