= Jeanne-Catherine Pauwels =

Jeanne-Catherine Pauwels (1795-1889) was a Belgian classical pianist and composer.

She was born to painter Jean-Baptiste Pauwels and Pétronille Vanden Borre. She studied music under Witzthumb and became known as a piano virtuoso. Because she was not professionally active, she was categorized as an amateur, but she performed at numerous concerts in salons in Brussels and attracted great attention for her musical abilities. She also composed music.
