= Antonio Ripa =

Spanish composer

Juan Antonio Ripa Blanque, usually referred to as Antonio Ripa and also known as Antonio Ripa y Blanque, (1721 - 3 November 1795) was a Spanish composer, priest, and choirmaster.

== Biography ==
Juan Antonio Ripa Blanque was born in Tarazona in 1721, and baptized on December 27 of that year. At the age of 11 he became a choirboy at the Tarazona Cathedral (TC); serving there from 1733 to 1740. He attended the diocesan seminary and was ordained as a priest prior to studying the organ in Zaragoza in 1745. After this he returned to the TC where he took a post teaching music. He was promoted to the role of maestro de capilla at the TC on 4 February 1746. He left this position when he was appointed maestro de capilla at the Cuenca Cathedral (CC). in 1753. He also served as rector of the Colegio San José; a choir school for boys attached to the CC. He remained at the CC through 1758.

Ripa served as chapel master of the Convent of Las Descalzas Reales in Madric from 1758 to 1768. After this he emigrated to Seville where he remained for the rest of his life. He maestro de capilla of the Seville Cathedral from 1768 to 1789. In his later life he taught at the Accademia Filarmonica di Bologna; being elected a member there on 11 November 1786.

Antonio Ripa died on 3 November 1795 in Seville. He is noted for his compositions of sacred music, including masses, carols, and other works.

== Works and recordings ==
Antonio Ripa (1718-1795). Música en la Catedral de Sevilla. M. Hinojosa, soprano; L. Mancini, mezzo-soprano; M. Mediano, tenor Enrico Onofri Orquesta Barroca de Sevilla OBS Prometeo 009
