= St. Rumbold's Cathedral =

Cathedral in Mechelen, Belgium

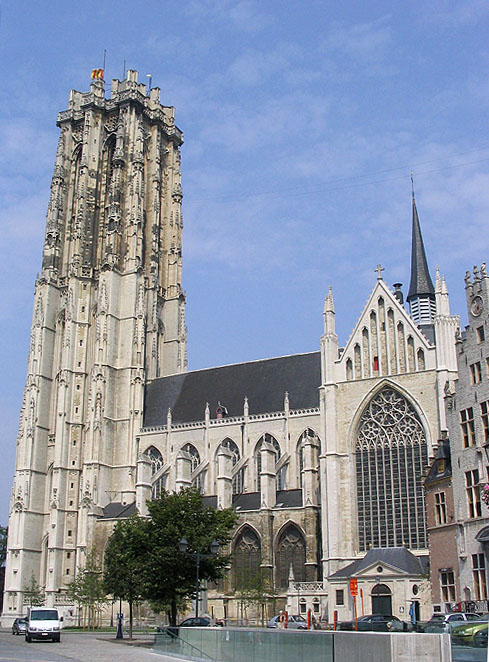

Religion
- Affiliation: Catholic
- Diocese: Mechelen–Brussels
- Ecclesiastical or organisational status: Cathedral
- Year consecrated: 1312

Location
- Location: Mechelen
- Interactive map of St. Rumbold's Cathedral
- Coordinates: 51°01′44″N 4°28′44″E

Architecture
- Groundbreaking: 1200
- Completed: 1520
- Height (max): 97 metres (318 ft) =

UNESCO World Heritage Site
- Part of: Belfries of Belgium and France
- Criteria: Cultural: ii, iv
- Reference: 943-016
- Inscription: 1999 (23rd Session)

St. Rumbold's Cathedral (Dutch: Sint-Romboutskathedraal; French: Cathédrale Saint-Rombaut) is the Roman Catholic metropolitan archiepiscopal cathedral in Mechelen, Belgium, dedicated to Saint Rumbold, Christian missionary and martyr who founded an abbey nearby. His remains are rumoured to be buried inside the cathedral. State-of-the-art examination of the relics honoured as Saint Rumbold's and kept in a shrine in the retro-choir, showed a life span of about 40 years and a death date between 580 and 655, while tradition had claimed 775 AD. (Note: The abbey founded by St. Rumbold in the 6th, 7th or 8th century and a 9th century St. Rumbold's abbey church subordinate to the bishops of Liège are assumed to have been located in the Holm, higher grounds a little outside the later city walls of Mechelen. A 9th century St. Rumbold's Chapel in the city centre stood till 1580, was rebuilt in 1597 and demolished in 1798. After Prince-Bishop Notger's founding of the St. Rumbold's Chapter around 1000, an adjacent collegiate church was built and its parish title was handed to the chapter in 1134. Most likely on its spot, already from around the next turn of the century onwards the well known St. Rumbold's Church was built, consecrated in 1312, and promoted to cathedral in 1559. This edifice never belonged to the abbey.)

In 1999, the tower of the cathedral was inscribed on the UNESCO World Heritage List as part of the Belfries of Belgium and France site, in recognition of its architecture and its importance in civic duties such as a watchtower.

== History ==
=== Construction ===
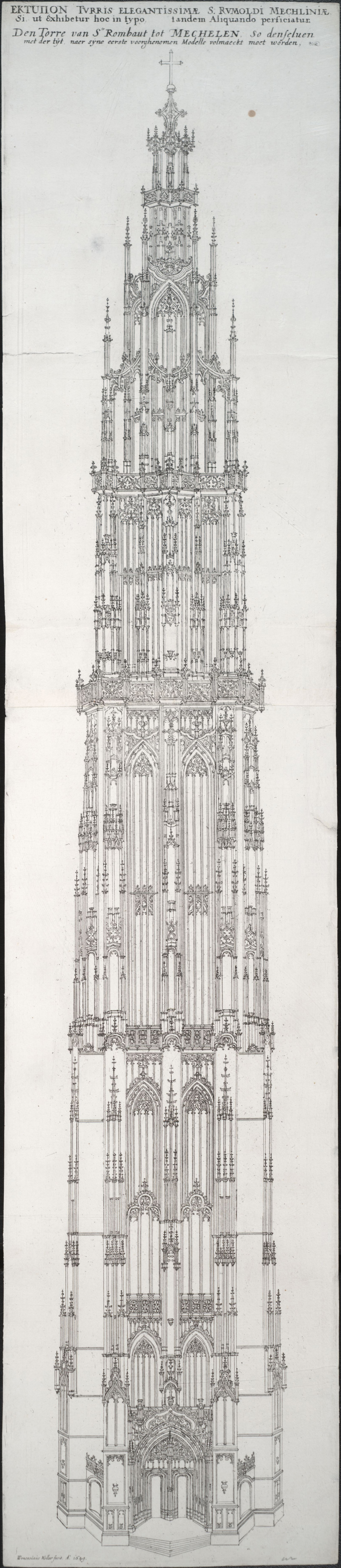
A 167 m finished tower design engraved in 1649 by Wenceslaus Hollar, with the headline: TVRRIS ELEGANTISSIMÆ S. RVMOLDI MECHLINIÆ

Construction of the church itself started shortly after 1200, and it was consecrated in 1312, when part had become usable. From 1324 onwards the flying buttresses and revised choir structure acquired Brabantine Gothic characteristics, distinct from French Gothic. After the city fire of 1342, the Master Mason Jean d'Oisy managed repairs and continued this second phase, which by the time of his death in 1375 formed the prototype for that High Gothic style. His successors finished the vaults of the nave by 1437, and those of the choir by 1451.

During the final phase of 1452–1520, the tower was erected, financed by pilgrims and later by its proprietor, the city. Designed to reach 600 Mechlinian feet (Note: The original designer of St. Rumbold's tower may have been Jan II Keldermans, Andries I Keldermans, or Wouter Coolman. (Source retrieved 25 July 2011). The now obsolete local foot came to 27.8 centimetres, roughly an inch shorter than the 30.48-cm long current British and American measure.) or about 167 metres, the very heavy St. Rumbold's tower was built on what had once been wetlands, though with foundations only three metres deep its site appears to have been well-chosen. After a few years, in 1454, its chief architect Andries I Keldermans constructed the Saint Livinus' Monster Tower (or St.-Lievensmonstertoren as it is called in Dutch) in Zierikzee (in the present-day Netherlands), where leaning or sagging of the tower (now 62 metres but designed for ca. 130) could wreck the church. This concern led to fully separate edifices, a solution also applied in Mechelen. At both places, in the early 16th century the upper part of the tower was abandoned, not for technical but for financial reasons. St-Rumbold's should have been topped by a 77-metre spire but only seven metres of this were built, hence the unusual shape. A deliberately weak connection closed the gap between tower and church upon finishing the construction.

=== Later history ===
The church has functioned as a cathedral since 1559. In the 18th century, each capital's surrounding ornament of sculpted cabbage leaves, that had been an inspiration for numerous Brabantine Gothic churches, was replaced with a double ring of crops. In 2005, after engineers had figured out the support capacity of ground and tower, there was talk of completing the entire spire from the original drawings. In 2010, prior to the construction of an underground car park at Saint Rumbold's north side, 4,165 skeletons were unearthed during archeological excavations of the cemetery.

== Tower ==
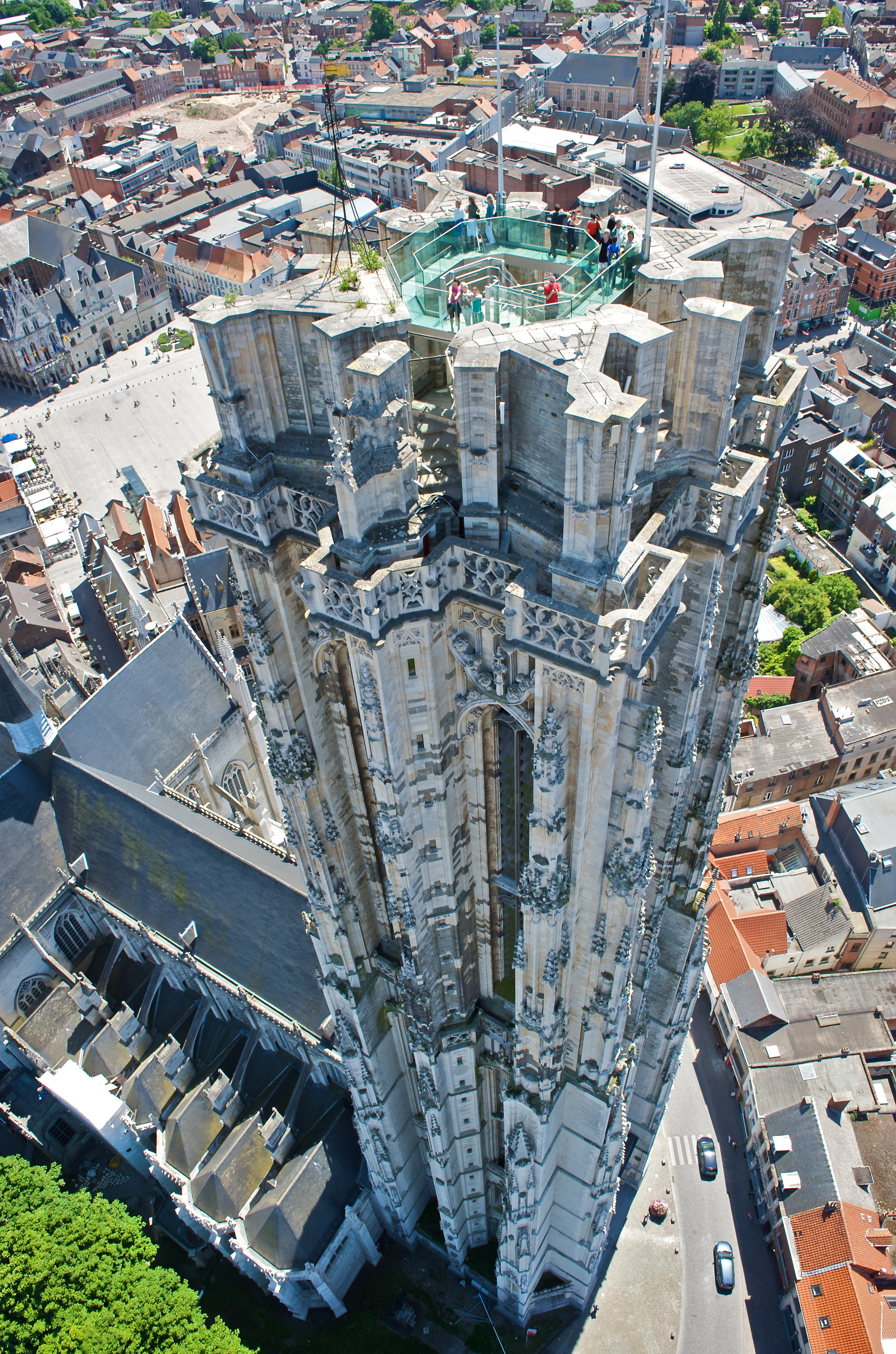
Unhindered view of the distant horizon (up to Antwerp and Brussels) is possible since 2009 from the Skywalk.

The flat-topped silhouette of the cathedral's tower is easily recognizable and dominates the surroundings. For centuries it held the city documents, served as a watchtower, and could sound the fire alarm. Despite its characteristic incompleteness, this World Heritage monument is 97.28 metres high and its 514 steps are mounted by thousands of tourists every year, following the footsteps of Louis XV, Napoleon, King Albert I, and King Baudouin with queen Fabiola in 1981.

Many of the region's cities have a nickname for their populace. The Mechlinians are said to have had ancestors running up their great Tower and passing on buckets of water to extinguish a blazing fire behind the perpendicular windows, where it turned out to be mere moonlight through sprightly clouds, hence are called Maneblussers ('Moon Extinguishers'). (Note: The full moon of 27 January 1687 caused all the stir about the presumed tower fire, reported as a 'happy-ending tragedy'. According to an 1808 sale's list Servais, Gaspar Joseph de (1808). "item 4242". Catalogue des livres de la bibliothèque de feu monsieur Gaspar-Joseph de Servais (in French). "4242. Maan – suchtigen Brand – sticht of Mechelsche beroerte. Bly-eyndend Treur-spel op St.-Rombouts Tooren den 27 january 1687, in volle maen, in-8°. met platen. V." (in outdated Dutch))

== Bells ==
The tower contains 49 bells and only the 6 largest bells swing, which are still in working order. The weights of the bells range from 16 kg to the most notable bell; the bourdon Salvator, which strikes the hours and weighs 8 tons. Up to 1923, the cathedral had 18 bell ringers prior to electricity taking over. Thirty-nine steps above this instrument, there is a second complete carillon on which concerts are played during the summer months.

== Interior ==
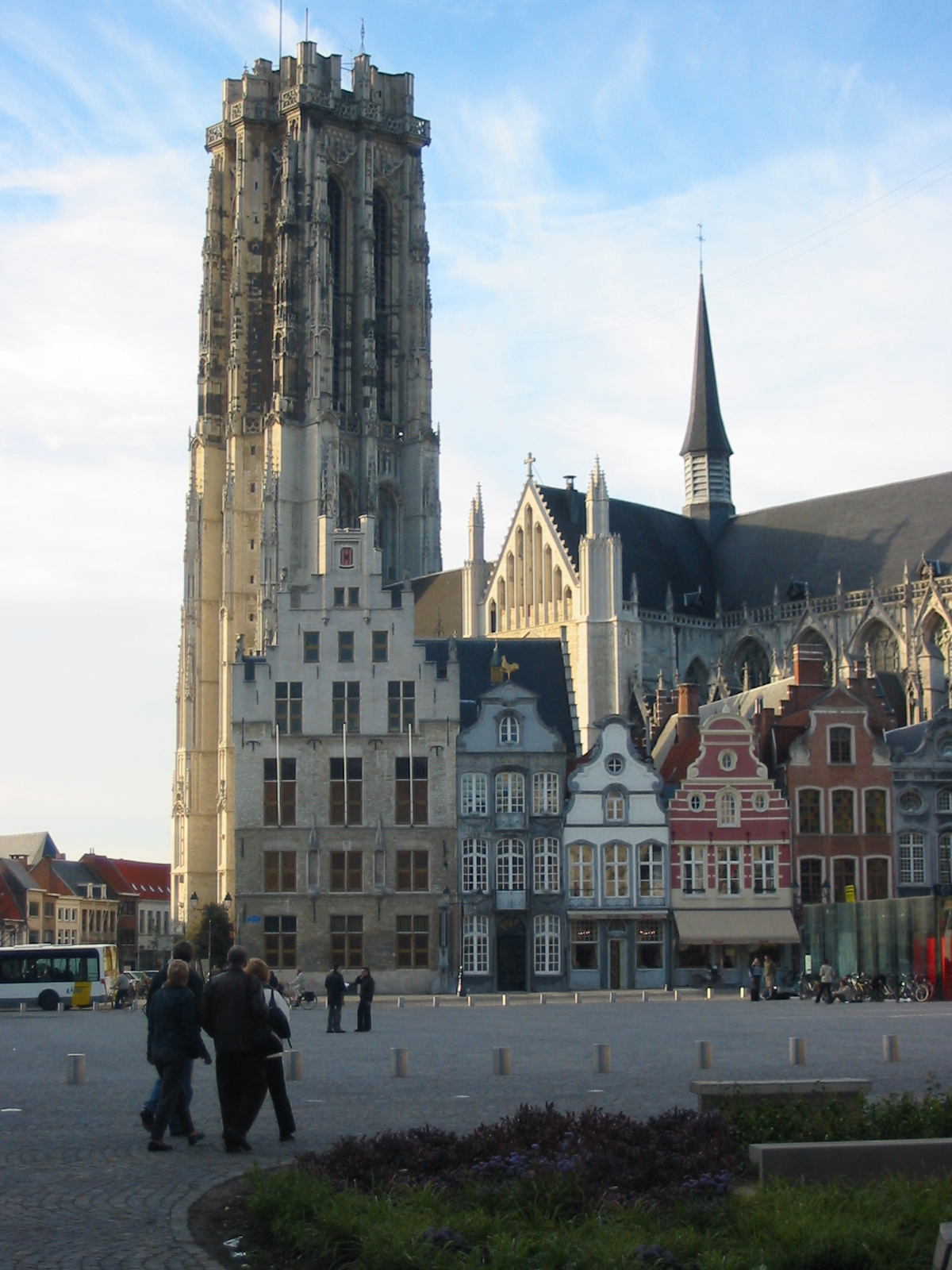
St. Rumbold's Cathedral towering above the Grote Markt square

The main entrance, underneath the tower, leads into the nave of the cathedral (approximately 118 metres long).

Apart from small heraldic shields, (Note: The small painted shields at St. Rumbold's should not be confused with the armour remnants in the Large Church of The Hague where (as in the Knights Hall there) the earliest Thirty Knights of the Golden Fleece had convened in 1456. (Source retrieved 31 July 2011)) dating from the Thirty Knights of the Golden Fleece chapter meetings presided in the church by young Philip the Handsome while his Burgundian inheritance was still under guardianship of his father, few original movables survive. Forty preciously decorated Gothic altars and all other furniture disappeared during the religious troubles of 1566–1585. Though the cathedral was spared in the 1566 Iconoclasm, Mechelen was sacked in the 1572 three-days Spanish Fury by slaughtering troops under command of Alva's son Fadrique, and suffered the English Fury of pillaging by rampant mercenaries in the service of the States General in 1580.

The interior features a Baroque high altar and choir by Lucas Faydherbe (with twenty-five paintings illustrating the life of Saint Rumbold), as well as paintings by Anthony van Dyck, sculptures by Lucas Faydherbe and Michiel Vervoort, and stained-glass windows, including one depicting – though with a white face – the Black Madonna painting in the church. (Note: The texts above and below the Madonna in the stained glass indicate portraying the Black Madonna painting in the cathedral; details of painting and its frame decoration however, are dissimilar.)

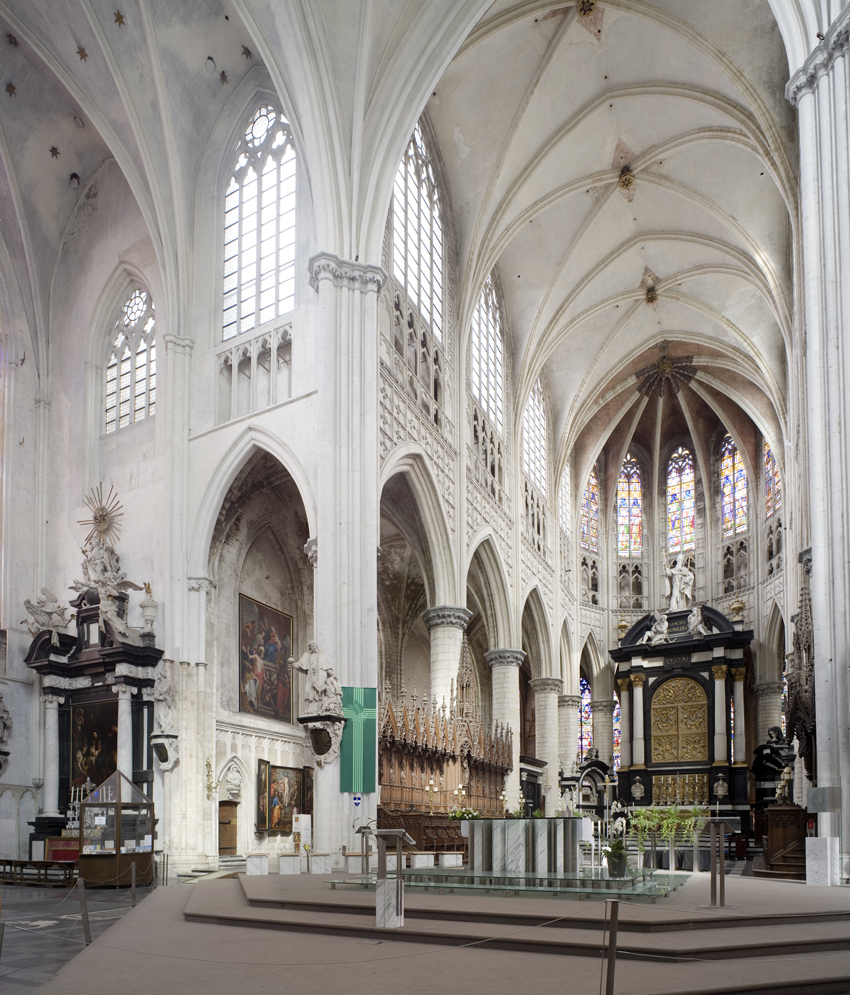
Interior of the nave

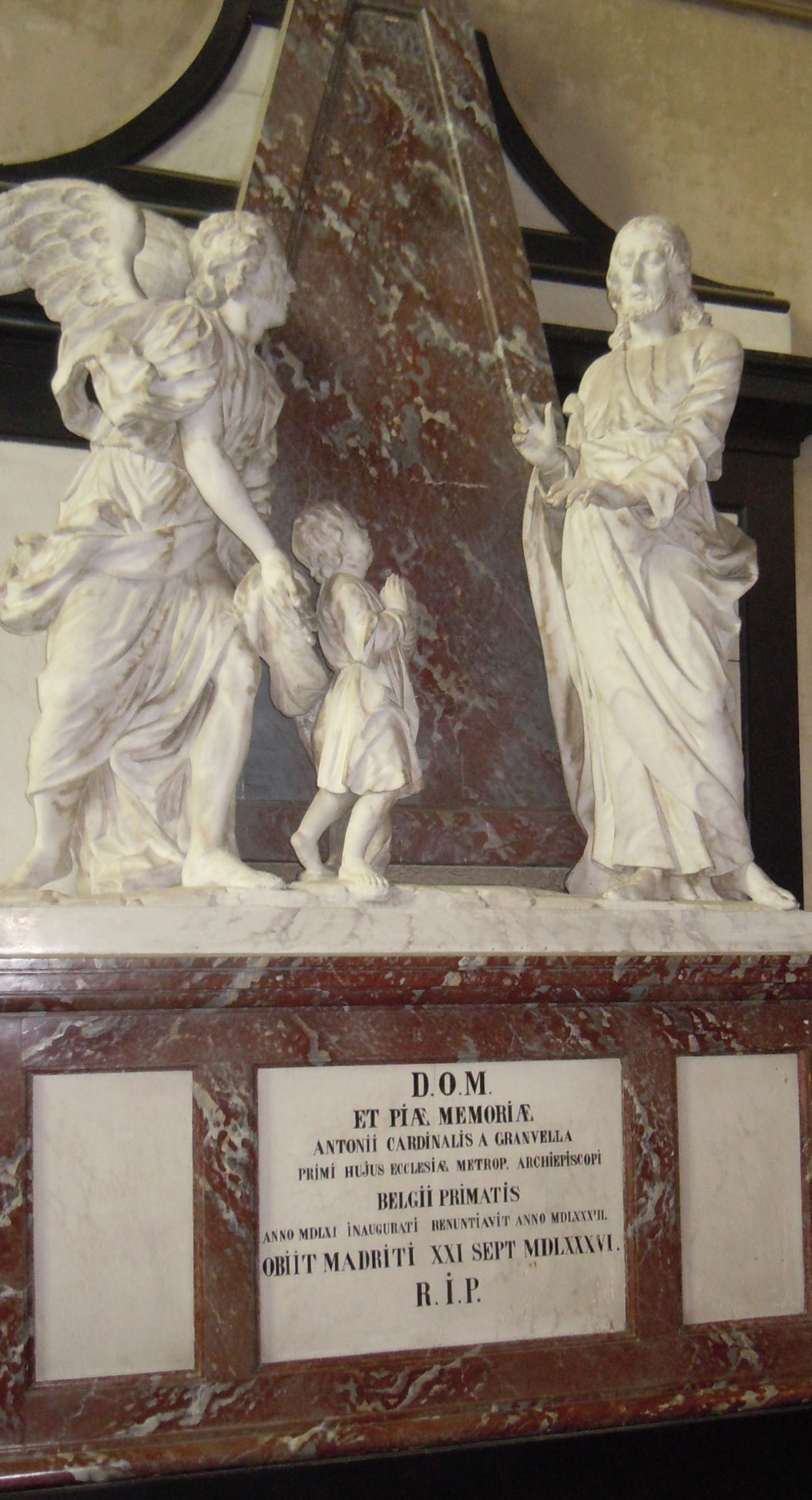
Tomb of Cardinal de Granvelle

Black Madonna painting

Black Madonna window

== Organs ==
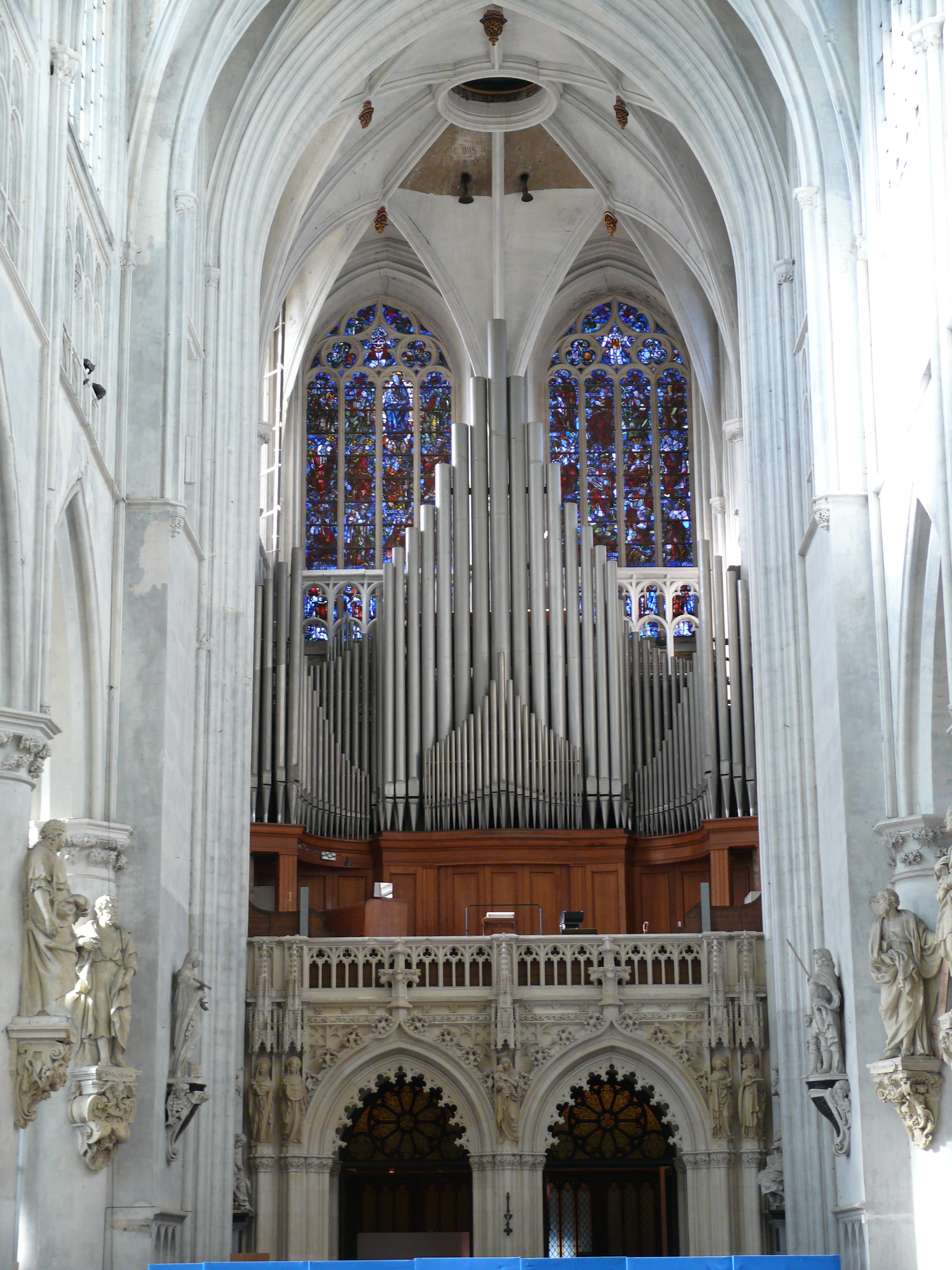
The Gallery Organ, built by Stevens

The cathedral has two organs. The main organ on the reverse side of the west facade was built in 1957 by organ builder Stevens. On the reverse of the side facade is a smaller organ, installed there in 1919 by the same organ builder Stevens. This instrument has 30 stops on two manual keyboards and pedalboard.

== Events at the cathedral ==
St. Rumbold's was the venue for the 2008 wedding of Count Rodolphe de Limburg Stirum to Archduchess Marie-Christine of Austria, daughter of Princess Marie-Astrid of Luxembourg.

=== Papal visit ===
In 1985, on his 65th birthday, Pope John Paul II celebrated a Mass at St. Rumbold's. Jo Haazen, then the city's carillon player, heard him state: "Your tower is not complete." (Note: The papal visit of Mechelen in 1985 included also the Church of Our Lady of Hanswijk, which John Paul II granted the title of basilica in 1987.)

== See also ==
- List of carillons in Belgium
- List of tallest structures built before the 20th century
- Flor Peeters, cathedral organist 1923 to 1986
- Jean Richafort, choir master 1507 to 1509
