= Jacob van Eyck =

Dutch musician and noble (died 1657)

Jonkheer Jacob van Eyck
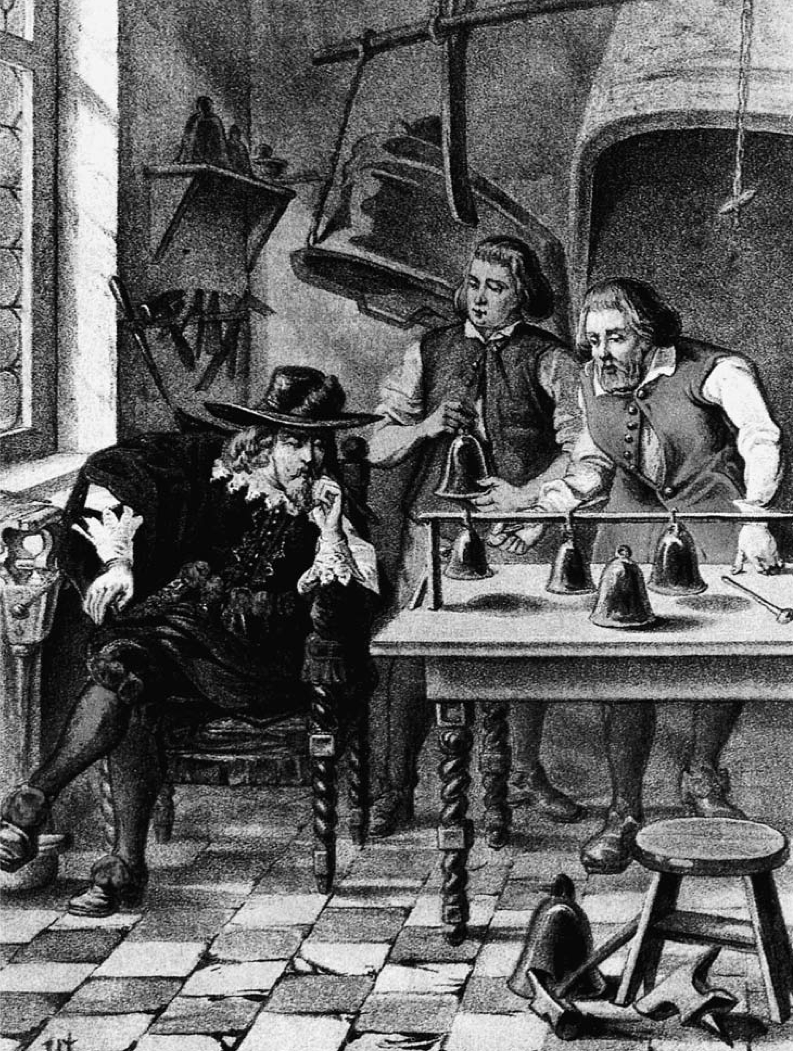
- Drawing of Van Eyck (pictured in black) with Pieter and François Hemony
- Born: c. 1590 probably The Hague, Dutch Republic
- Died: 26 March 1657; Utrecht, Dutch Republic
- Years active: 1619–1657
- Known for: Isolating the overtones of bells; Inventing the modern carillon with the Hemony brothers
- Notable work: Der Fluyten Lust-hof

Jonkheer Jacob van Eyck (/væn ˈaɪk/ van EYEK, Dutch: [ˈjaːkɔp fɑn ˈɛik]; c. 1590 – 26 March 1657) was a Dutch nobleman, composer and blind musician. He was one of the best-known musicians of the Dutch Golden Age, working as a carillon player and technician, a recorder virtuoso, and a composer. He was an expert in bell casting and tuning, and taught Pieter and François Hemony how to tune a carillon. Van Eyck is credited with developing the modern carillon together with the brothers in 1644, when they cast the first tuned carillon in Zutphen. He is also known for his collection of 143 compositions for recorder, Der Fluyten Lust-hof, the largest work for a solo wind instrument in European history.

== Biography ==
=== Early life ===
Jacob van Eyck was born in 1589 or 1590 (Note: The precise date of his birth is unknown; on 23 January 1628 he swore before an Utrecht notary that he was "about thirty-eight years old.") into a noble family probably in The Hague and raised in the nearby town Bergen op Zoom. Born blind, he lived with his mother and father well into adulthood. Van Eyck moved to the town of Heusden and became involved as a player and technician of the town's carillon by 1618. He met with several craftsmen and the city organist to discuss changes and improvements to the carillon, which he carried out in 1620 and 1621.

=== Carillon career ===
Van Eyck quickly established himself as a renowned carillon player and technician. In 1623 and 1624, he was employed by the city of Utrecht to repair and renovate the Dom Tower's clock and carillon. A year later, after negotiations with the city, he left home to become the city carillonneur. Over the years, he undertook projects to expand and improve the bell towers at the city hall, the Nicolaïkerk, Janskerk and the Jacobikerk. His title was changed to "Director of the Bell-Works" in 1628, and he was entrusted with the technical supervision of all the bells of the city. He began instructing students to learn to play the carillon. In 1631, he had a small keyboard composed of 30 small bells constructed for instruction. A year later, he was appointed the carillonneur of Janskerk. Later in 1645, he accepted the same position at the Jacobikerk and the city hall.

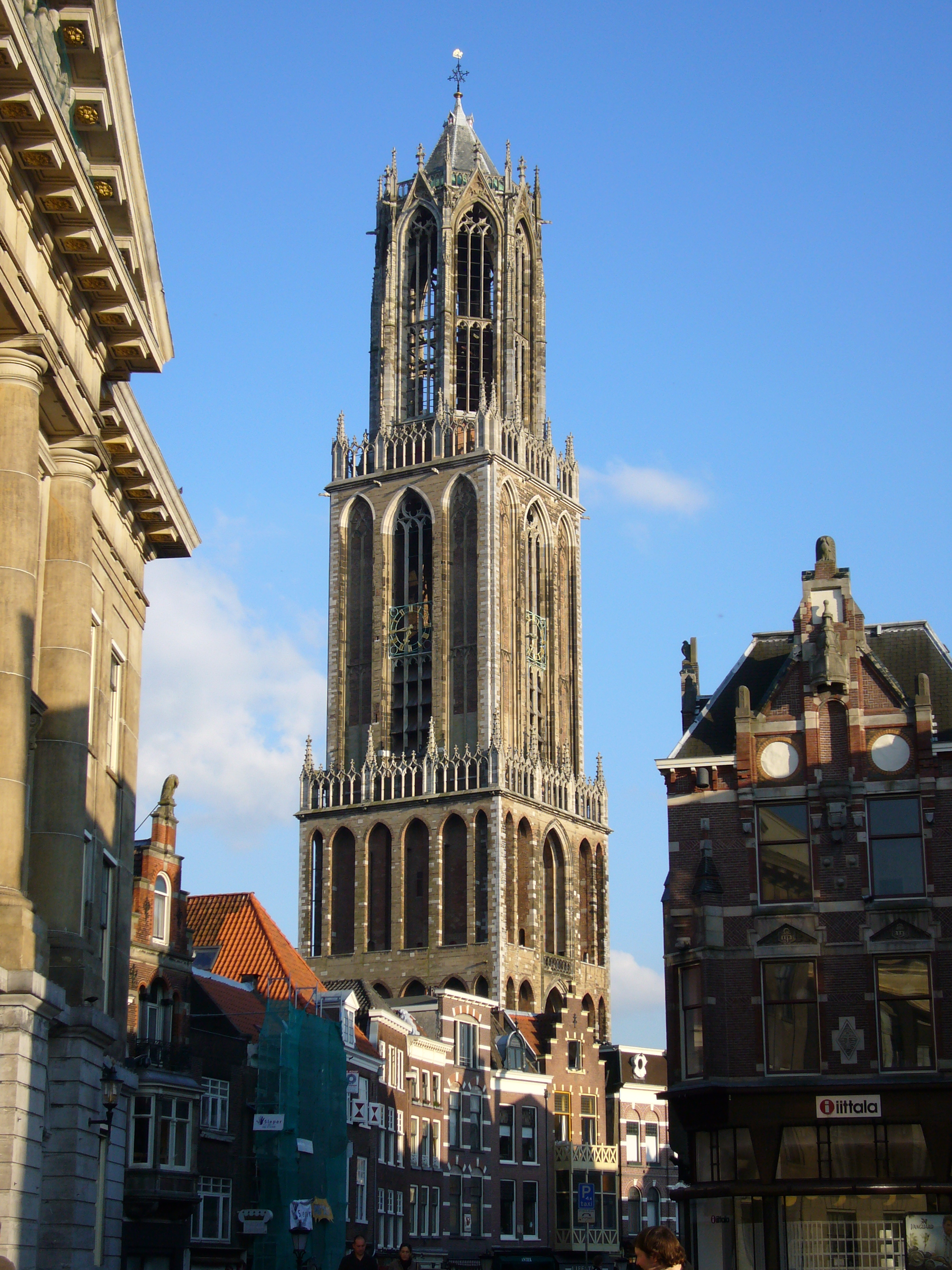
The Dom Tower of Utrecht, where Van Eyck was employed as a carillonneur from 1625 until his death

=== Campanology career ===
Van Eyck belonged to a circle of academics who met and corresponded regularly to exchange ideas. One of these was Marin Mersenne, who was the first to codify the harmonics of a vibrating spring. Van Eyck applied Mersenne's research to the acoustics of tuned bells. He devised methods for isolating the partials of a bell by whistling at the partials' resonant frequencies. Van Eyck showcased his discovery to mathematician René Descartes, who on 23 August 1638, wrote to Mersenne: "In Utrecht lives a blind man with a great musical reputation, who regularly plays bells (...). I have seen how he elicits 5 or 6 different sounds on each of the largest bells, without touching them, but only by coming close to their sound rim with his mouth..." In 1633, Van Eyck told Isaac Beeckman that the ideal series of a bell's partials consisted of three notes each an octave apart, supplemented by a minor third and perfect fifth in the second octave, and he convinced Beeckman to write about it in his journal on 24 September. The minor overtone series causes the characteristic melancholy sound of a well-tuned carillon.

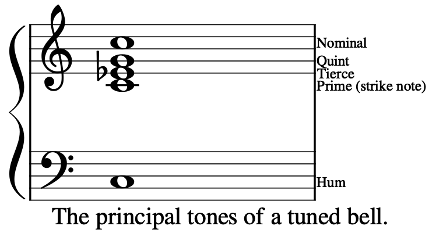
The five principal tones of a tuned "C" bell discovered by Van Eyck represented on a grand staff

Not only could they be isolated, but Van Eyck asserted that they could be tuned harmoniously with each other by altering the shape of the bell itself. He claimed that it is not possible for a bell to be properly tuned upon casting, but instead that adjustments needed to be made to tune it. His assertion was put to the test in 1644. The city of Zutphen commissioned the famous bellfounding duo Pieter and François Hemony to cast a new carillon for its Wijnhuis tower. The city appointed Van Eyck as its consultant. He convinced the Hemony brothers to tune their carillon bells according to his research before finishing the job, rather than waiting for a negative review from the city. To achieve this, François cast the carillon bells slightly too thick so that they could be shaved down while tuning. Where other bellfounders haphazardly shaved the inside of a bell in an attempt to fix its tune, François placed them on a lathe rotated by five or six men to guarantee symmetry. He then shaved down the insides with a chisel to tune the five principal tones. Hemony carillons outfitted with "pure" tuned bells quickly became the standard and were coveted across Europe for decades. Van Eyck's acquaintance with the intellectuals of the time along with his longstanding relationship with bellfounders helps explain how he was able to influence the Hemony brothers.

=== Recorder career ===
In addition to his work with the carillon, Van Eyck was a particularly skillful recorder player. In 1644 in Amsterdam, Paulus Matthysz published Van Eyck's Euterpe oft Speel-goddinne I, a collection of variations on popular folk songs at the time for recorder. It was later renamed to Der Fluyten Lust-hof I. A subsequent volume (Der Fluyten Lust-hof II) was published in 1646 and a revised and greatly enlarged version of the first volume was published in 1649. Probably in response to the success of the works, Sint Janskerk increased the salary paid to Van Eyck provided that he entertain passers-by with songs on his recorder. A second version Der Fluyten Lust-hof II was published in 1657 and a third and final version of Der Fluyten Lust-hof I was published c. 1656.

=== Later life and death ===
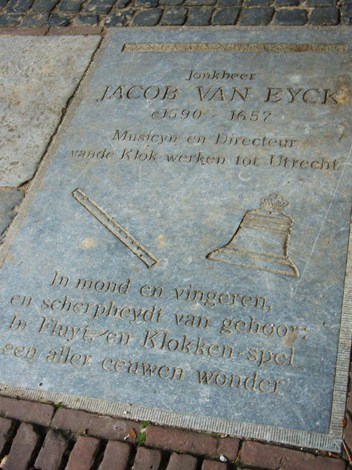
The 2006 Van Eyck memorial in Utrecht's Dom Square

The final years of Van Eyck's life were spent in declining health. He died on 26 March 1657 in Utrecht. His assistant and caretaker Johan Dicx was the principal legatee of his will and succeeded him in most of his carillonneur positions. He was buried the next day, and for three hours, the bells of Sint Janskerk, the Jacobikerk, and the Dom Tower were tolled in his memory. Lambertus Sanderus composed a four-line verse that is inscribed on Van Eyck's gravestone. In 2006, the mayor of Utrecht unveiled an inlaid memorial tablet in the Dom Square, at an angle to Dom Tower. The Utrecht Bellringers Guild awards the Jacob van Eyck Prize every three years to fund the preservation of Dutch cultural and historical heritage and campanological research. In 2023, the mayor of Utrecht renamed the passageway underneath the Dom Tower as the Jacob van Eyck Passage.

== Works ==
Van Eyck's sole published work, Der Fluyten Lust-hof, is an extensive collection 143 melodies, each with a number of diminutions or variations for solo soprano recorder. The themes include folk songs, dance tunes, church music, psalms, and songs of the day, as well as a few compositions by Van Eyck. Some of the best known include a variation on John Dowland's "Flow, my tears" and a favorite Christmas carol at the time, "Unto Us Is Born a Son". Some of the variations are considered challenging even for an experienced recorder player. Der Fluyten Lust-hof remains the largest work for a solo wind instrument in European history; it is also the only work of this magnitude to have been dictated rather than written down by the composer.

== Bibliography ==
=== Books ===
- Van Baak Griffioen, Ruth, ed. (1991). Jacob van Eyck's Der Fluyten Lust-Hof (1644-c1655). Utrecht, Netherlands: Vereniging voor Nederlandse Muziekgeschiedenis. ISBN 978-9063751517.
- Gouwens, John (2013). Campanology: A Study of Bells, with an Emphasis on the Carillon. North American Carillon School. ISBN 978-1-4840-3766-9.
- Griscom, Richard W.; Lasocki, David (17 June 2013). The Recorder: A Research and Information Guide. Routledge. pp. 530–. ISBN 978-1-135-83932-1.
- Michel, Winfried; Teske, Hermien, eds. (1984). Jacob van Eyck (ca. 1590–1657): Der Fluyten Lust-hof. Winterthur, Switzerland: Amadeus Verlag – Bernhard Päuler.
- Price, Percival (1983). Bells and Man. Oxford University Press. ISBN 978-0-19-318103-8.
- Rombouts, Luc (2014). "Pure Bells". Singing Bronze: A History of Carillon Music. Translated by Communicationwise. Leuven University Press. pp. 85–96. ISBN 978-90-5867-956-7.
- Swager, Brian (1993). A history of the carillon: its origins, development, and evolution as a musical instrument (DMus). Indiana University. pp. 16–20.
- Wind, Thiemo (2011). Jacob Van Eyck and the Others: Dutch Solo Repertoire for Recorder in the Golden Age. Utrecht, Netherlands: Koninklijke Vereniging voor Nederlandse Muziekgeschiedenis. ISBN 978-90-6375-219-4.
- Wind, Thiemo (1 July 2024). "Jacob van Eyck before 1619: a Reconstruction". Carillon and Bell Culture in the Low Countries. 3 (1): 1–56. doi:10.5117/BKL2024.1.001.WIND.

=== Internet ===
- Cashman, David. "Jacob van Eyck". AllMusic.
- Oron, Aryeh (August 2006). "Jacob van Eyck (Composer)". Bach Cantatas.
- Wind, Thiemo (11 February 2008). "Chronology". Jacob van Eyck.
- "De koning van het carillon" [The King of the Carillon]. Utrechts Klokkenluiders Gilde [Utrecht Bellringers Guild] (in Dutch). Archived from the original on 10 May 2021.
- "Onderdoorgang Domtoren Utrecht heet nu officieel Jacob van Eyckpassage: 'Hij is de Johan Cruijff van de carillons'" [Underpass Dom Tower Utrecht is now officially called Jacob van Eyckpassage: 'He is the Johan Cruijff of the carillons']. De Utrechtse Internet Courant [The Utrecht Internet Courant] (in Dutch). 24 August 2023.
