= Pieter and François Hemony =

17th-century European bellfounders

Hemony brothers
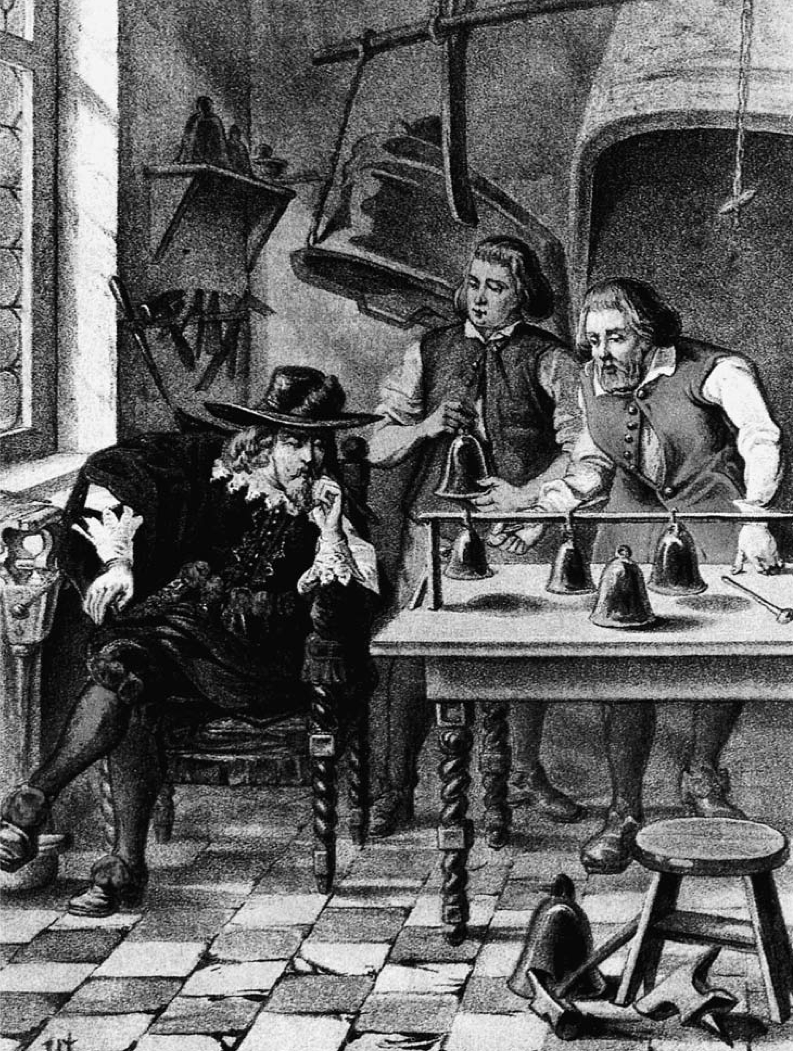
- 1875 drawing of the brothers with Jacob van Eyck
- Occupation: Bellfounders
- Years active: 1641–1680
- Known for: Developing the tuned carillon with Van Eyck
- Pieter Hemony
- Born: Pierre Hemony; 1619; Levécourt, France
- Died: 20 February 1680 (aged 60–61); Amsterdam, Dutch Republic
- François Hemony
- Born: c. 1609; Levécourt, France
- Died: 24 May 1667 (aged c. 57–58); Amsterdam, Dutch Republic

Pieter Hemony (born Pierre Hemony; 1619 – 20 February 1680) and his brother François Hemony (c. 1609 – 24 May 1667) were the greatest bellfounders in the history of the Low Countries. They developed the carillon, in collaboration with Jacob van Eyck, into a full-fledged musical instrument by casting the first tuned carillon in 1644.

The brothers' skill was unequaled in their time; after their death, their guarded trade secrets were lost, and not until the 19th century were bells of comparable tuning quality cast. Even today, most Hemony bells sound pure and clear.

== Life ==
The brothers Hemony were born in Levécourt (in present-day Champagne-Ardenne, France) into a family of bell founders who travelled throughout Europe to cast bells. It is likely that they relocated their business to Germany during the Thirty Years' War, where François cast his first swinging bell. In 1641, they first cast swinging bells in the Netherlands for the Reformed Church in Goor, but their career reached a watershed when they settled in Zutphen and cast the world's first tuned carillon, installed in Zutphen's Wijnhuistoren tower, in 1644. That instrument was lost to fire in 1920.

François and Pieter developed their ability to build and tune carillons in close cooperation with Jacob van Eyck, a musician and composer who developed a method of precisely identifying the overtones of bells. Van Eyck, appointed city carillonneur of Utrecht in 1642, had drawn the attention of leading scientists of his day, such as Christiaan Huygens (his relative) and René Descartes, with his ability to isolate five partials of a bell by whistling to create sympathetic resonance.

When struck, a bell produces a number of partials which, if imprecisely tuned, can create an unpleasant sound and which prevents it from harmonizing in accordance with other bells. To address this problem, the Hemony brothers gave their bells a particular profile and thickened it in certain places. The bells were then tuned by hollowing ridges from specific parts of the inner wall until the first few partials were acceptably in tune.

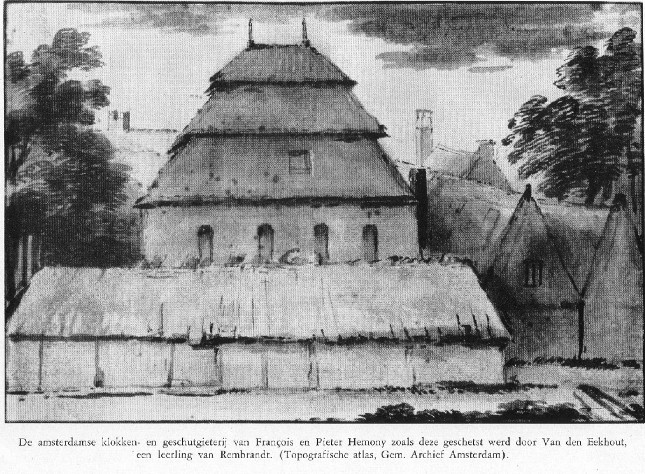
The foundry of the Hemony brothers in Amsterdam; on the corner of Keizersgracht/Leidsegracht, around 1660

In 1657, the brothers parted ways. François moved to Amsterdam, at the invitation of the city government, to establish a foundry. He cast twenty carillons as well as statues for various sculptors, such as Artus Quellinus the Elder. Pieter travelled through the southern Netherlands, with much time spent in Ghent in present-day Belgium, where he cast the great carillon for the Belfry of Ghent. However, following conflicts with the city of Ghent over the quality of his work, Pieter in 1664 rejoined his brother in Amsterdam where, together, they cast some of their finest carillons, including that of the Dom Tower of Utrecht and the Town Hall (now the Royal Palace on Dam square). Bell production temporarily ceased following the outbreak of the Second Anglo-Dutch War in 1665 as they devoted their foundry to casting artillery.

A few days after writing his will, François Hemony died on May 24, 1667. For his funeral at the Nieuwe Kerk in Amsterdam, a bell of his own casting was tolled for three and a half hours. Although Pieter would resume casting carillons in 1670, the foundry's best production had come to an end. Pieter died on February 20, 1680.

== Carillons ==
In total, the brothers cast 51 carillons for towers in the Netherlands, Belgium, Germany, and other countries, Here follows the complete list.

=== Pieter and François in Zutphen 1642–1657 ===
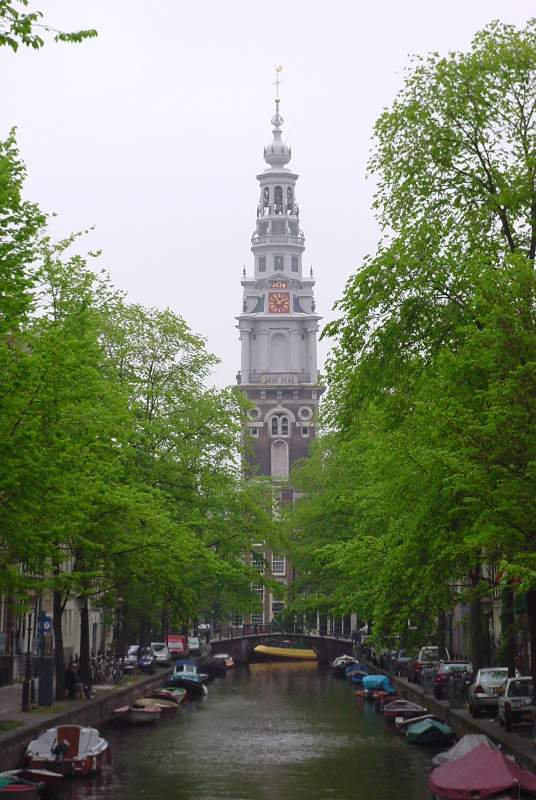
The Hemony carillon of the Zuiderkerk in Amsterdam was installed in 1656

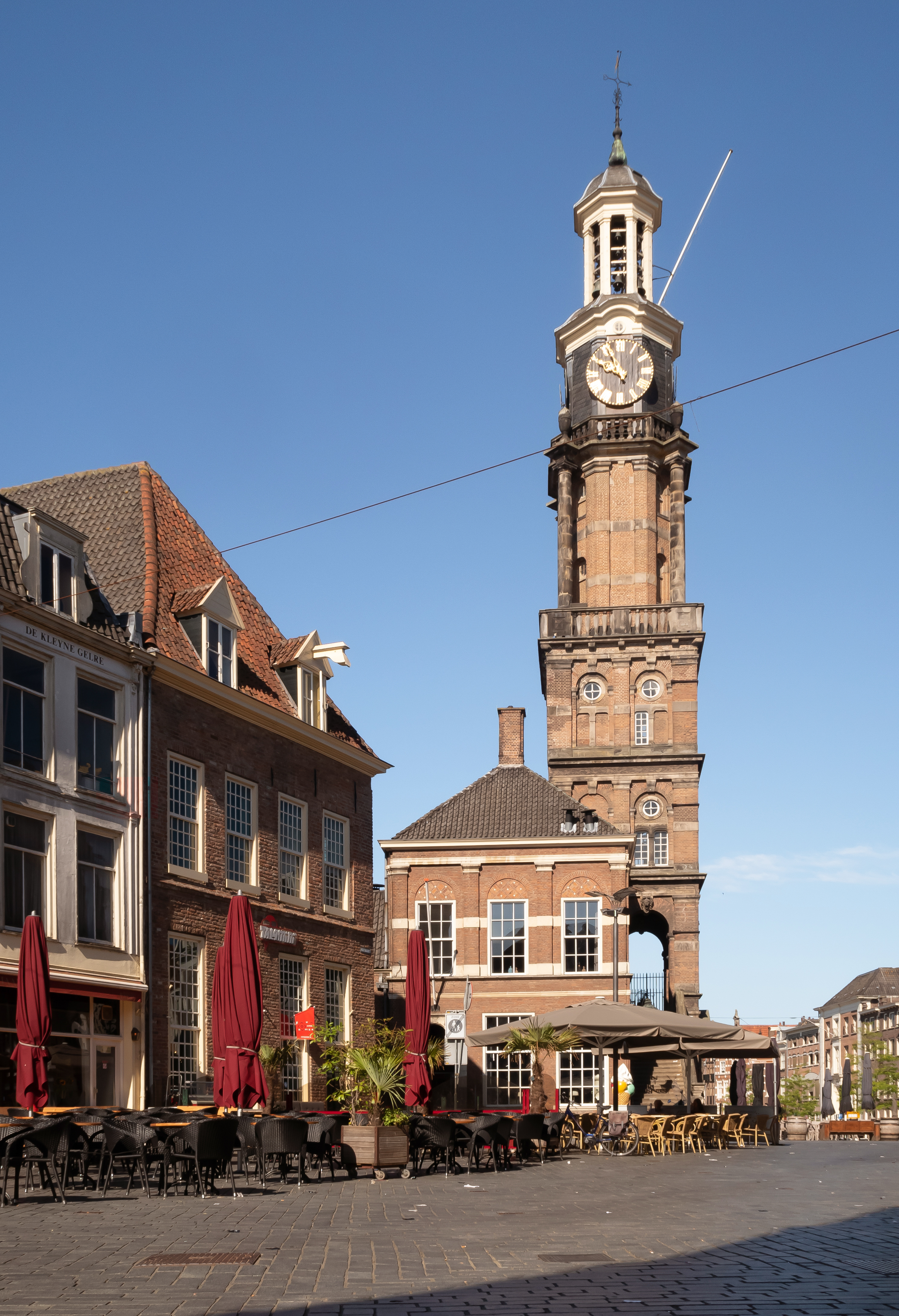
Wijnhuistoren, Zutphen

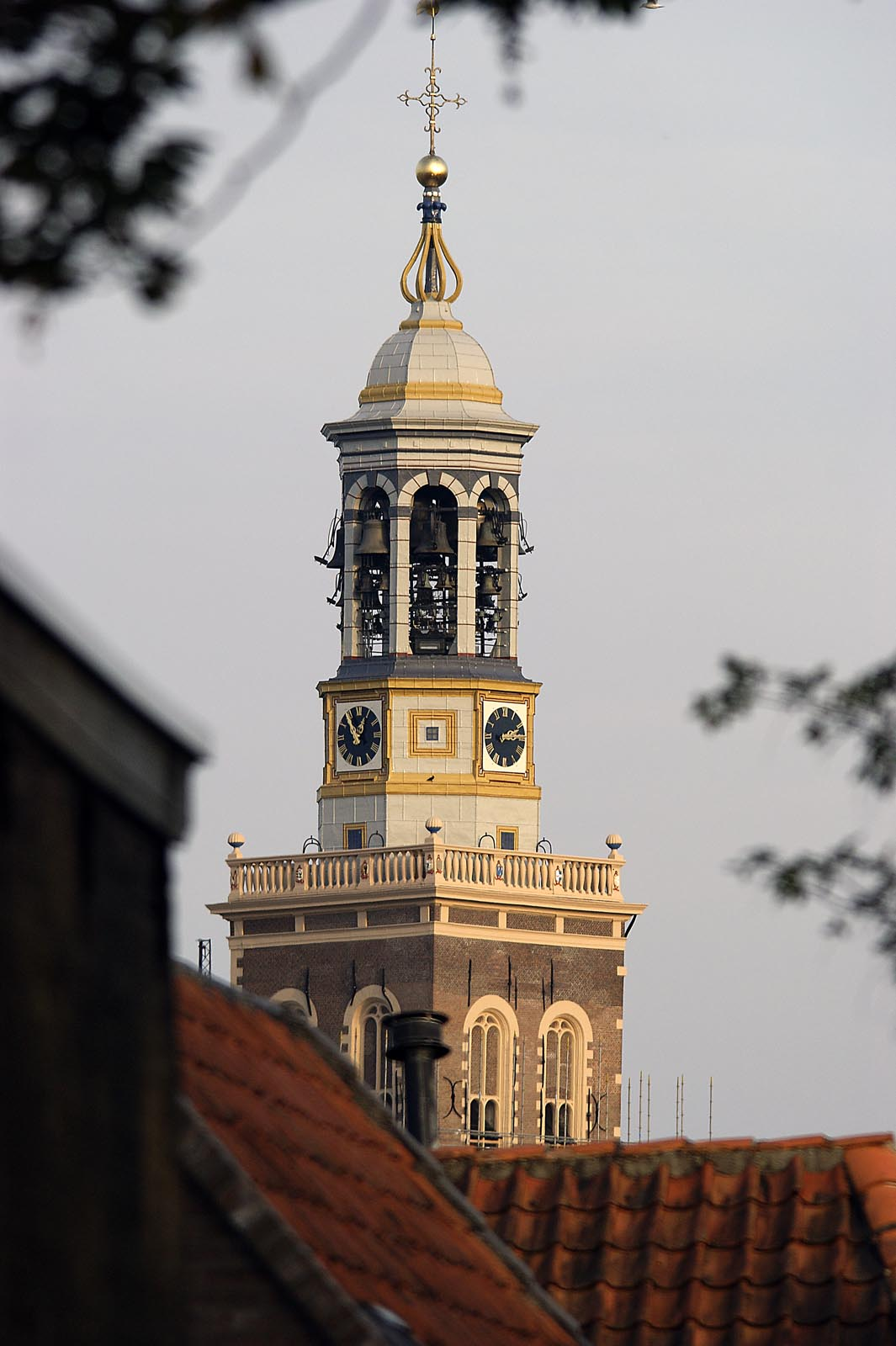
Nieuwe Toren in Kampen just after the restoration in 2011

- Wijnhuistoren in Zutphen (1644–46). First ever made well tuned carillon. Was lost in a tower fire in 1920
- Grote or Lebuinus kerk in Deventer (1647) latest renovation of the carillon in 2011
- Zuider of St. Pancrastoren Enkhuizen 1647–1649 – François 1664 enlarged – Pieter 1674 enlarged again; latest renovation in 1992. New baton keyboard in 2013.
- Stadhuis (Town Hall) in 's-Hertogenbosch Cast in 1649; put in the tower and first use in 1657.
- Nicolaïkerk in Utrecht (1649) restoration round 1990
- Eusebiustoren in Arnhem 1650–1651 François 1661 enlargement. Was lost in 1944 during a bombing raid. Some bells survived.
- Jacobitoren in Utrecht. François and Pieter 1651 Pieter 1668 enlargement. Was lost in a storm in 1674. Some bells survived as swinging bells.
- Munttoren in Amsterdam One of the towers of the former Regulierspoort city gate. The remaining tower was enlarged by Hendrick de Keyser. François en Pieter cast it in 1651. It was the first carillon (22 bells) for Amsterdam made for the tower of the Beurs (Stock Exchange building) also by Hendrick de Keyser. It was moved in 1668 to the Munttoren and made larger by Pieter Hemony with bass and treble bells (33 bells). Restoration in 1959 by Petit & Fritsen
- Gasthuistoren in Zaltbommel. Cast by François en Pieter in 1654. Bells were buried in a garden during world war two. Renovation and retuning by Eijsbouts in 1959.
- Barbaratoren in Culemborg (1654/55) Just 9 bass bells by Hemony. other bells by Eijsbouts 1952 tuned in meantone temperament like all Hemony carillons.
- Martinitoren in Doesburg. Cast by François en Pieter 1654/55. Was lost in World War II when the Nazis blew up the tower in 1945. It was situated outside on top of the tower on one side of the spire. The new carillon is inside the tower.
- Onze-Lieve-Vrouwekathedraal in Antwerp and Church- or Kapittelbeiaard 1654/55. Was lent to St. Catharin church at Hoogstraten. Some bells missing in Hoogstraten are lent to other parishes and some disappeared.
- Onze-Lieve-Vrouwekathedraal in Antwerp. Stads- (city) of Kermisbeiaard (Pleasure fair Carillon) by François en Pieter 1655 enlarged by them 1658. Latest renovation 2014. Automatic drumm part will follow soon.
- St. Michielsabdij in Antwerp. Cast by François en Pieter 1655. Lost in 1797 during the French period, during religious wars (Protestants against the Roman Catholics).
- Zuidertoren in Amsterdam (1656). Due to the success of the Beurs carillon, François was invited to cast a new carillon for the Zuidertoren as a replacement of the old Waghevens chime. After this François was invited to be the 'City Bell Founder' and to do the same job in the Westertoren and Oudekerkstoren. Pieter Hemony left for Gent in Flanders around that time.

=== François in Amsterdam 1657–1664 ===
- Oude Kerk in Amsterdam (1658)
- Westertoren in Amsterdam (1658)
- Onze Lieve Vrouwetoren in Amersfoort (1659/1662/1663)
- Nieuwe Toren in Kampen (1659)
- Nieuwe Kerk Delft (1659/60) Pieter 1678 enlarged.
- Grote or Sint-Catharijnekerk in Brielle (South Holland) (1660) Bells were taken away in world war two by the Nazis, but during the transport, the ship was sabotaged and sunk in the deepest part of the lake IJsselmeer. So the Hemony carillon was saved and after the war it returned to Brielle. It was enlarged with a bass octave by Eijsbouts and now inside the tower; in the past it was in the window on the east side of the tower.
- Laurenstoren Rotterdam (1660). The bells were almost devastated in the second world war but thanks to a new constructed concrete floor under the bell chamber all Hemony bells were saved.
- Beurstoren Rotterdam (1660). This carillon was till 1829 in the former town hall. Destroyed in 1940 during the bombing of Rotterdam by Nazi Germany.
- Averbode Abdijtoren (1659–1662) 19 bells from 1661/62 in this carillon are in 1819 sold by A.J. van den Gheyn to Huy in Wallonia and still there in the northern of Sint-Materne tower of the Collegiale Onze Lieve-Vrouwekerk.
- Mainz Liebfrauenstift (1660/or 1661) Devastated by a fire in a war between French and Germans in 1793.
- Grote Kerk, Haarlem (1660-1661-1662-1664) enlargement by Pieter in 1670. Part of the bells are in the Bakenesserkerk. New bells by Eijsbouts in the Grote Kerk for them and enlarged to 4 octaves.
- St. Nicolaïtoren Hamburg 1661 enlargement by François en Pieter in 1665. Devastated in a fire in 1842.
- Sint Hyppolytustoren Middelstum François (1661–1662)
- Belfort Brussels François (1662–1663?) Devastated in a fire by shooting of French soldiers in 1695.
- Grote or Sint-Stephanuskerk / Stadstoren (City tower) Hasselt, Overijssel in the Netherlands François 1662. Devastated in a fire in 1725.
- Martinitoren in Groningen François (1662/63) enlargement by Pieter in 1671.
- Der Aa-kerk Groningen François 1662 (1663?) Devastated in a storm by fire in 1671.
- Bakenessertoren Haarlem François 1663 (en 1662-1661?) Carillon was sold to get money for the city in 1795. Some of the bells are possibly in Huy in Belgium. The present Hemony bells in Bakenessertoren in Haarlem are from the tower of the Grote- or Sint-Bavokerk.

=== Pieter in Ghent 1657–1664 ===
- Abdijtoren Tongerlo. Pieter 1657/58 This carillon was lost during the French Revolution.
- Belfort Ghent Pieter 1659/60. In 1948 part of the carillon from Beaudelootoren was used in this carillon. Renovation and restoration took many years but it finished in 1982. The famous cracked 'Klokke Roeland', which was on the square beside the building, is welded now and can be rung now in a concrete construction on the same square waiting for its return to the belfry.
- Sint-Salvatorabdij/Abdijtoren Ename near Oudenaarde Pieter 1660, enlarged by him in 1677. Was stolen by the French during the French Revolution. A part of the bells was traded subsequently in France. Eric Sutter, a French carillon specialist, has been able to locate 10 of the 40 bells in 7 different churches throughout the northern part of France.
- Boudelo-abdij-toren Ghent Pieter 1661. In 1948 part of this carillon was used to enlarge the Belfort carillon.

=== Pieter and François in Amsterdam 1664–1667 ===
- Domtoren Utrecht François en Pieter 1663/64. The carillon was restored in 1972.
- Sint-Gertrudtoren Stockholm. François en Pieter 1663/65. Devastated in a fire in 1878.
- Stadhuis Amsterdam, now Royal Palace on Dam Square. François en Pieter 1664. It was renovated by Eijsbouts in 1965. Only 9 bells by François and Pieter Hemony remained. 38 new bells by Eijsbouts were made and tuned in meantone temperament. The old corroded Hemony bells are kept inside the palace.
- The Town Hall in Maastricht – This carillon is one of the last which has been cast by the two brothers together, just before the death of François (1664). The bells were made for the city of Diest, but this city in Belgium did not want it at that time. So the carillon was sold by Pieter for the town hall in Maastricht. During the restoration of the carillon in 1962, 11 bells from 1664 by Hemony were removed from the carillon for sound technical reasons, these were replaced by new bells made by Eijsbouts in Asten. One of those deprecated Hemony bells can still be seen in the Carillon museum 'Klok en Peel' in Asten. The other 10 deprecated Hemony bells are still missing.

=== Pieter in Amsterdam 1667–1680 ===
- Willibrorduskerk (basilica) Hulst Pieter 1670. Carillon was lost in a fire in 1876.
- Residenzschloss (Ducal Palace) Darmstadt Pieter 1670. After restoration attempts of the carillon, where it was tuned in a wrong way, again include 1937, the bells were destroyed in the second world war during a bombing raid in 1943.
- Sint Sulpitiuskerk Diest Pieter 1671.
- Grote- or Sint Cyriacuskerk Hoorn Pieter 1671. In 1838 this carillon was destroyed in a fire. Plummers had an accident on the roof of the church with their lead smelter.
- Town Hall Ostend Pieter 1671. This carillon was devastated in 1706 by acts of war.
- Grote or Sint-Laurenskerk Weesp Pieter 1671 The bells were purchased by Weesp in 1676 after earlier attempts by Hemony to offer them to Bruges (Abdij ter Duinen (Abbaye dunes)), Emden and Cambrai (St. Aubert Abbey).
- Drommedaris (Dromedary tower) Enkhuizen Pieter 1671/74/75/77. Carillon was in stock by Pieter Hemony and was exchanged with the probably larger bells (Chime) by Geert van Wou which came from the St Pancras or Zuidertoren in Enkhuizen. It is the smallest carillon made by Pieter Hemony. Between 2011 and 2015 the cupola was renovated and the carillon rehung. A new baton keyboard was installed.
- Sint-Romboutstoren Mechelen Pieter 1674, based on the older present bass bells The carillon was rehung in 1980/81 in a lower bell room. Since a new carillon by Eijsbouts appeared in this large tower it was seldom used and the carillon fell in disrepair, but in 2010 this instrument was repaired by tower guard / clockmaker Nick Vanhaute. He also made the large drum one of the best automatic playing in Europe. Today the bells can be heard automatically on the drum only. The baton keyboard is almost never in use.
- Sint Janskerk in Gouda has the final remaining carillon by Peter Hemony from 1677/78 and the only Hemony carillon with complete basses. (included C# and Eflat) Restoration by Eijsbouts round 2000
- Town Hall Leiden Pieter 1677/78 and after his death his pupil and nephew Mammes Fremy made the basses in 1680. Was devastated in 1929 in a big fire.

== Variances ==
In August 2002, divers made a remarkable discovery in a 17th-century shipwreck near the island of Texel, Netherlands. They found a perfectly preserved bell which, according to the text engraved on it, had been cast at the Amsterdam foundry of François Hemony in 1658. The bell weighs 132 kg and is 59.5 cm in diameter.

In the Netherlands, several places have a street named after the Hemonies: Amsterdam, Middelstum, Venray, Assen, Zutphen and Arnhem.
