= Bellmaking =

Bellmaking may refer to:

- Bellfounding, the casting bells in a foundry for use in churches, clocks, and public buildings
- The process of making the large open bell end in Brass instrument construction
