= Dom Tower of Utrecht =

Bell tower in Utrecht, Netherlands

Dom Tower
- Domtoren
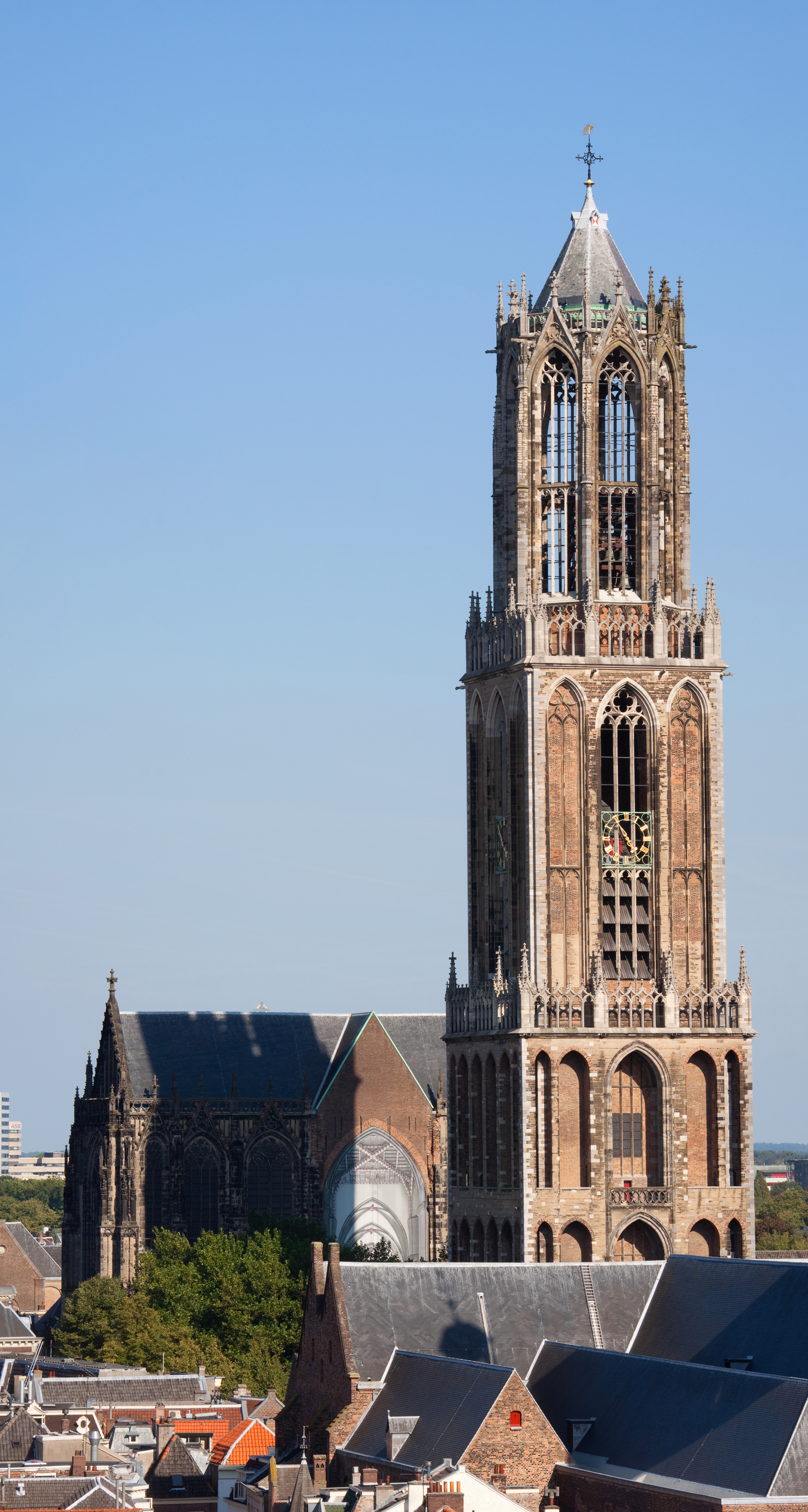
- Dom Tower, with the remaining part of the cathedral in the background

Location
- Location: Utrecht, Netherlands
- Interactive map of Dom Tower
- Coordinates: 52.09065°N 5.12140°E

Architecture
- Type: Church tower
- Style: Gothic
- Groundbreaking: 1321
- Completed: 1382
- Height (max): 112.32 m (368.5 ft)
- Designated as NHL: Dutch rijksmonument #36075

The Dom Tower (Dutch: Domtoren 'Cathedral Tower') of Utrecht is the tallest church tower in the Netherlands, at 112.32 metres (368.5 feet) in height. It is considered the symbol of Utrecht. The tower was part of St. Martin's Cathedral, also known as the Dom Church, and was built between 1321 and 1382, to a design by John of Hainaut. The cathedral was never fully completed due to lack of money. Since the unfinished nave collapsed in 1674, the Dom tower has been a freestanding tower. The tower stands at the spot where the city of Utrecht originated almost 2,000 years ago.

== Design and construction ==
Its construction led preacher Geert Groote to protest against the vanity of such an immense project, suggesting it was too tall, too expensive and all but aesthetic.

The tower consists of two square blocks, topped by a much lighter lantern. One of the most striking features is the absence of visible buttresses. Upon completion in 1382 the tower stood 109 metres tall. However the height was increased during the restorations in 1910, to its present height of 112.5 metres.

The Dom tower was a multifunctional building. In addition to being a belfry, it contained a private chapel of the Bishop of Utrecht on the first floor. It also served as a watchtower; the tower guard was housed on the second floor of the lower square block.

== Carillonneurs of the Dom Tower of Utrecht ==
The Dom tower has a carillon in its building. There were many operators of the Carillon spanning from the 16th century to now.

Here is a list of all the carillonneurs that played in the Dom tower:

Years		Carillonneur
1	1594-1606	Daniël van Berlicom
2	1606-1611	Jan van Groenenberg
3	1611-1623	Gijsbert van Berlicom
4	1623-1624	Herman van Riemsdijk
5	1625-1657	Jonkheer Jacob van Eyck
6	1657-1666	Johan Dicx
7	1666-1700	Carel Valbeek
7	1666-1700	David Slichtenhorst
8	1700-1708	Jacob Han
9	1708-1709	Gerard Han (father of Jacob Han)
10	1709-1721	Jacob Han
11	1721-1733	Johan Han (brother of Jacob Han)
12	1733-1737	Rutgerus ten Hengel
13	1737-1778	Johan Philip Albrecht Fischer
14	1778-1840	Frederik Nieuwenhuyzen
15	1840-1879	Willem Johan Frederik Nieuwenhuysen
16	1879-1894	J.A.H. Wagenaar I
17	1894-1943	J.A.H. Wagenaar II
18	1937-1953	J.A.H. Wagenaar III
19	1954-1985	T.C. (Chris) Bos
20	1985-2011	Arie Abbenes
21	2011-	Małgosia Fiebig

== Bells ==
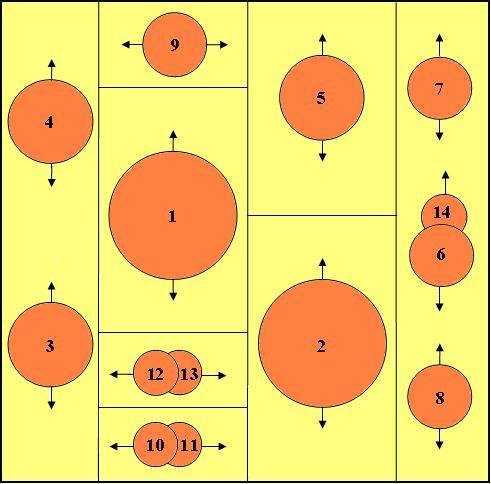
A schematic arrangement and ringing direction of the bells in the bell chamber of the Dom Tower. The numbers refer to the bells in the table.

=== Ringing Bells ===
The Dom Tower has an exceptional peal of fourteen ringing bells, weighing 32 tonnes in total. In 1505 Geert van Wou, then the most famous bell-founder of the Netherlands, made a harmonious peal of thirteen bells. The seven smallest bells, sold in 1664 to finance the new carillon, were replaced in 1982 with new bells by Eijsbouts. The largest bell or bourdon is Salvator and it weighs 8 tonnes. Together with the fourteenth bell, they form the largest existing homogeneous group of medieval bells. The cathedral's bells are still rung by hand by members of the Utrecht Bellringers Guild.

No.	Name	Weight (kg)	Bell Founder	Casting year
1	Salvator (Bourdon Bell)	8227	Geert van Wou	1505
2	Maria (2nd Bourdon Bell)	5915	Geert van Wou	1505
3	Martinus (3rd Bourdon Bell)	4273	Geert van Wou	1505
4	Michael	3343	Geert van Wou	1505
5	John the Baptist	2398	Geert van Wou	1505
6	Mary Magdalene	1655	Geert van Wou	1505
7	Agnes Maior	1305	Eijsbouts	1982
8	Agnes Minor	1146	Eijsbouts	1982
9	Pontianus	942	Eijsbouts	1982
10	Cross bell (Campana Crucis)	662	Eijsbouts	1982
11	Benignus	467	Eijsbouts	1982
12	Thomas	396	Eijsbouts	1982
13	Adrianus	281	Eijsbouts	1982
14	Jesus Mary John	392	Geert van Wou	1506

=== Carillon ===
In 1625, Jacob van Eyck became carillon player of the Dom Tower. In 1664, a new carillon was installed by Juriaan Sprakel of Zutphen, with a mechanism consisting of 35 chimes, made by the brothers Pieter and François Hemony. In 1972 the carillon was restored and extended to 50 bells. The current player is Małgosia Fiebig

In 1479, the first chime of six bells was hung in the tower. This set had grown to twenty-one bells when the city council of Utrecht ordered a new carillon of thirty-five bells from the bell founders Pieter and François Hemony in 1663. For the new carillon, the old carillon bells and a number of the smaller ringing bells by Van Wou were melted down. Thirty-four bells are still originally by the Hemony brothers; the remaining sixteen were cast in 1972 during a comprehensive restoration by the Royal Eijsbouts Bell Foundry in Asten. A new bell frame was also built at that time. The carillon has a range of four octaves and the largest bell or bourdon which strikes the hours weighs over 7,000 kg.

== Storm damage ==
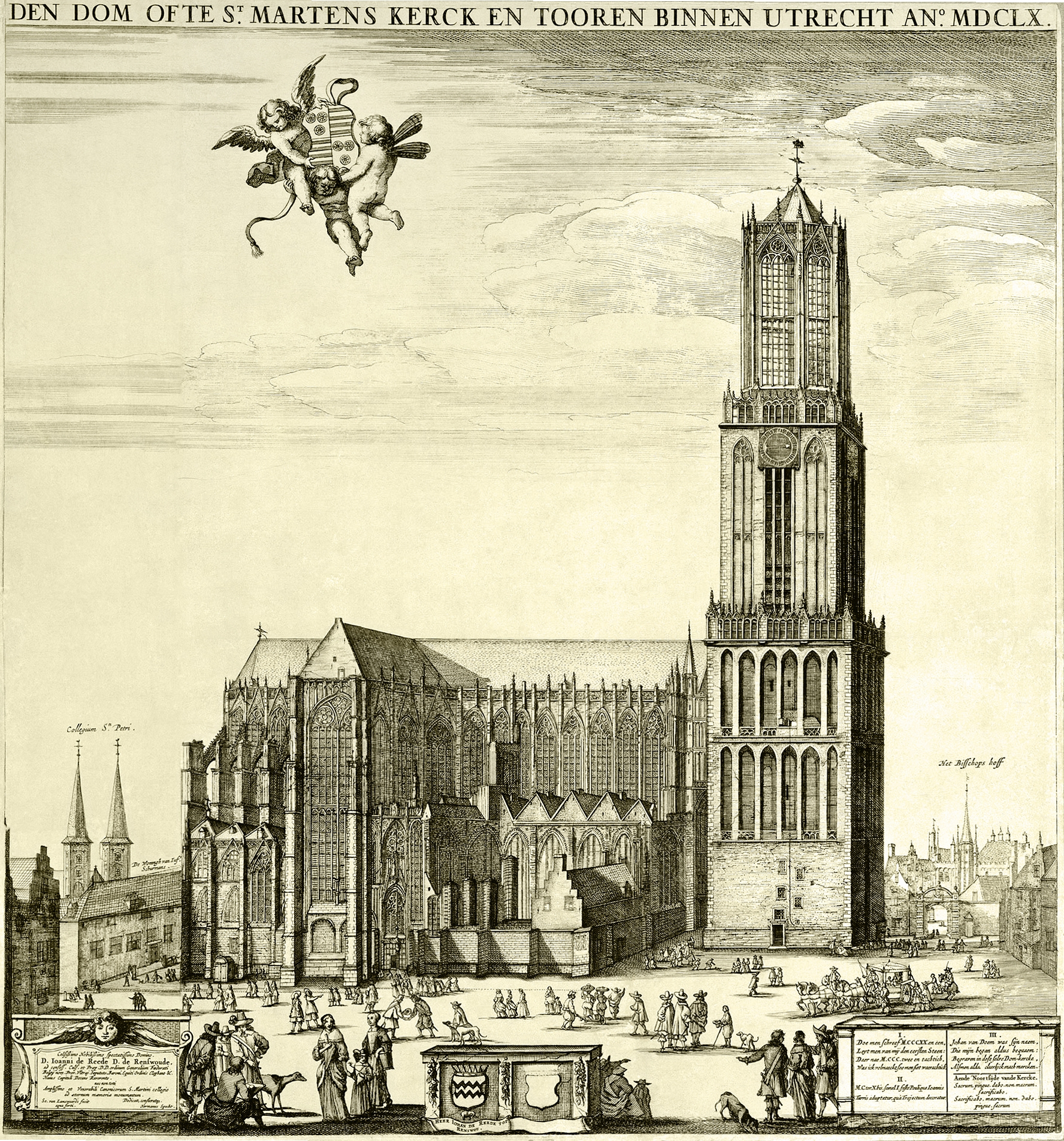
Dom Church as it looked prior to 1674, with the nave still standing. Etching after Steven van Lamsweerde, 1660.

The cathedral's nave was never completely finished, and on the night of August 1, 1674, a tornado destroyed this part of the cathedral, but the tower was undamaged.

The remaining section of the church and the tower were never reconnected, and the Domplein Square now separates the two structures. In the summer of 2004, however, a mock nave was constructed out of scaffolding to commemorate the missing link. The floorplan of the missing section is shown by the multicoloured paving of the square.

In 1836 the top floor of the tower was heavily damaged in a storm and demolition of the tower was seriously considered. However, it was subsequently restored, a process which took five years.

== Tourism and weddings ==
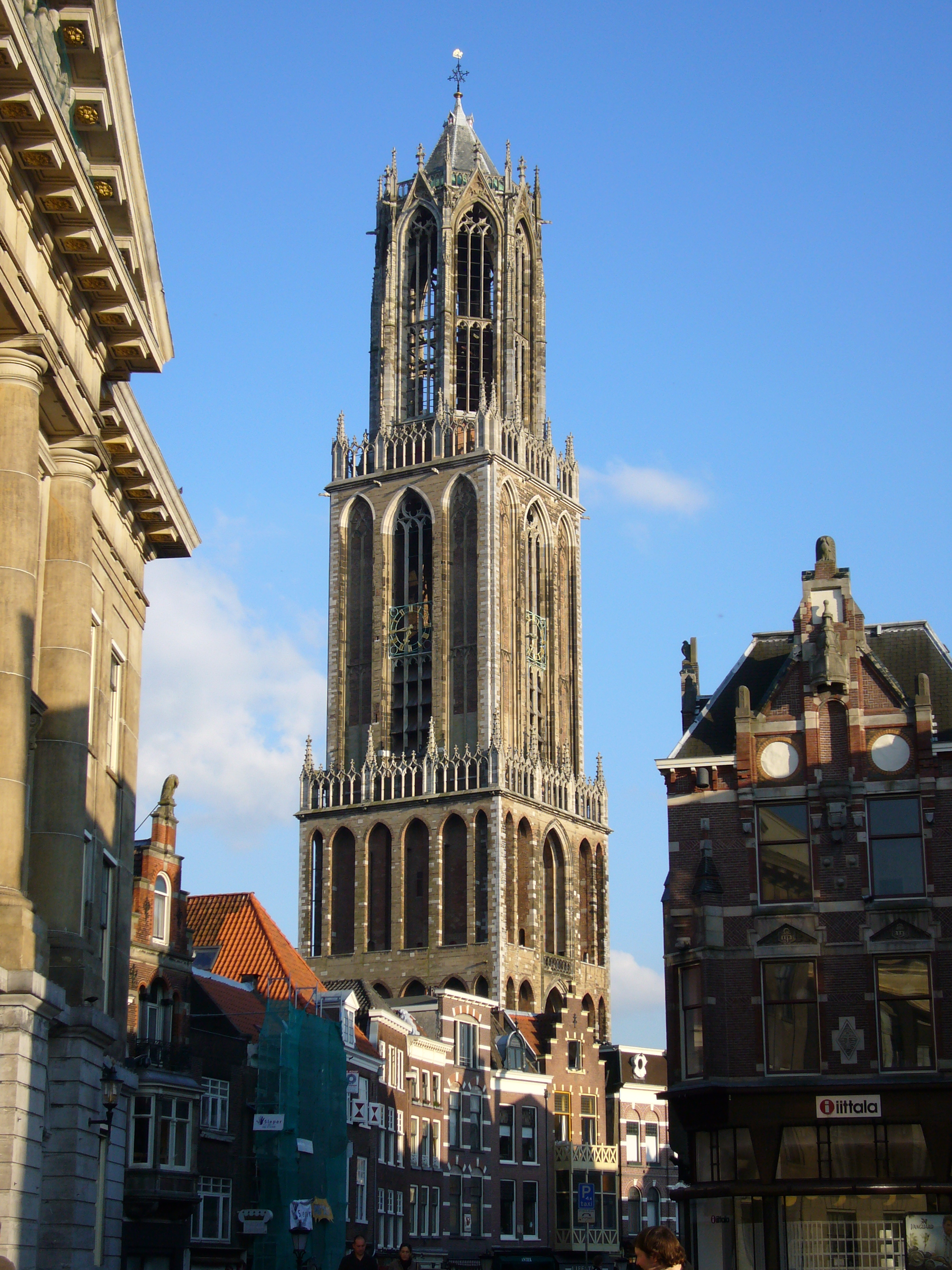
Dom Tower from the northwest

The tower has its own visitor centre, RonDom (which refers to both the Dutch word rond or rondom, meaning around or surrounding and the name of the church - emphasised by the capital D), which is located in the square. As well as stocking a range of souvenirs, they organise a number of activities centred on the tower, including regular guided tours which allow people to climb the 465 steps to the top of the Dom Tower. On a clear day it is possible to see both Amsterdam and Rotterdam. The booking office for guided tours is located in the square at the foot of the tower. It is also possible to get married in the tower.

== Radio DOM (1999) ==
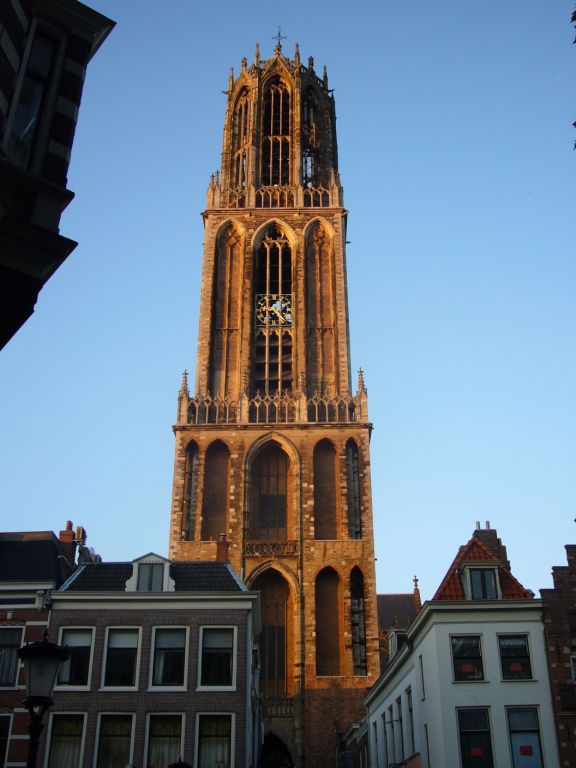
Dom Tower in evening light

Radio DOM was an automatic radio-station located on the Dom tower in Utrecht, which from 3 June 1999 until 3 October 1999 broadcast an audio 'soundscape' based on the sounds of the city of Utrecht. Radio DOM got its inputs from six computer-controlled surveillance microphones installed at a height of 80 metres on the Dom tower, which constantly scanned the central area of the city. The sound signals picked up by these microphones were algorithmically combined into a continuously varying soundscape which was broadcast 24 hours a day by an FM radio transmitter installed on the Dom tower.

Broadcast on 102.3 MHz FM, Radio DOM was part of the exhibition Panorama 2000, organised by the Centraal Museum in Utrecht.

== King's Night Illumination ==
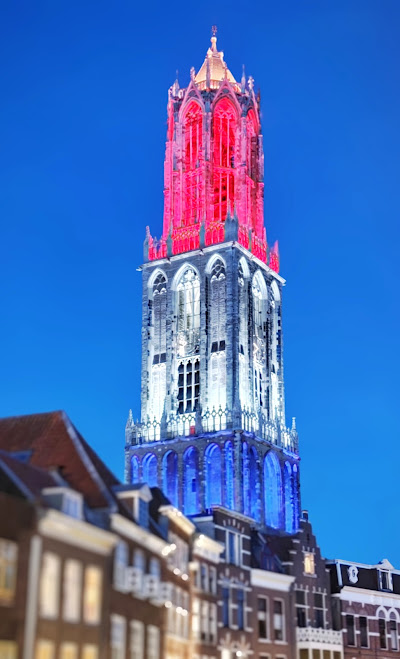
King's Night Illumination | Dom Tower

On King's Night, the tower is lit in the Dutch national colours of red, white, and blue. A distinctive feature of this display is the lantern (the tower's summit), which is illuminated in orange—representing the Dutch national colour and the House of Orange-Nassau—effectively forming an "orange crown" at the top of the structure.

== Local planning restrictions ==
Until recently, the unwritten rule in evaluating planning applications in the city of Utrecht was that no building could be built that exceeded the Dom Tower in height. This restriction seems to have been dispensed for plans in the developing suburban area in the west of Utrecht (Leidsche Rijn) and a skyscraper of 262 metres in height has been proposed, challenging this long-standing tradition. The plans for this tower, however, were cancelled in 2010 due to the 2008 financial crisis.

== Restorations ==
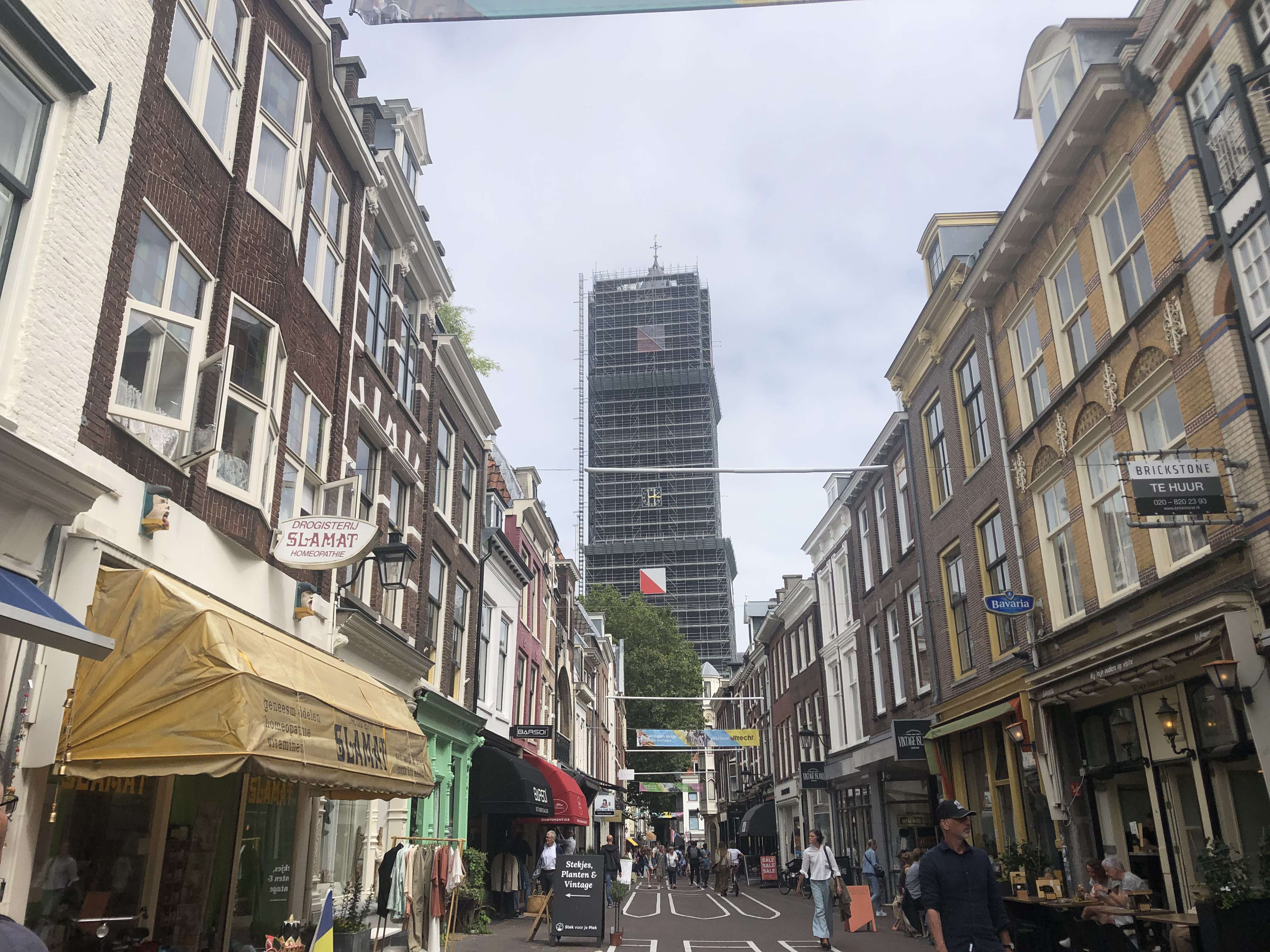
Dom Tower in 2023

From 2019 to 2024, the tower underwent restoration works. The restoration was only done on the exterior of the tower.

== Replica ==
A replica of the Dom Tower has been constructed in the Dutch themed amusement park; Huis Ten Bosch (theme park) at Sasebo, Nagasaki, Japan. Google Street View

== Panoramas ==
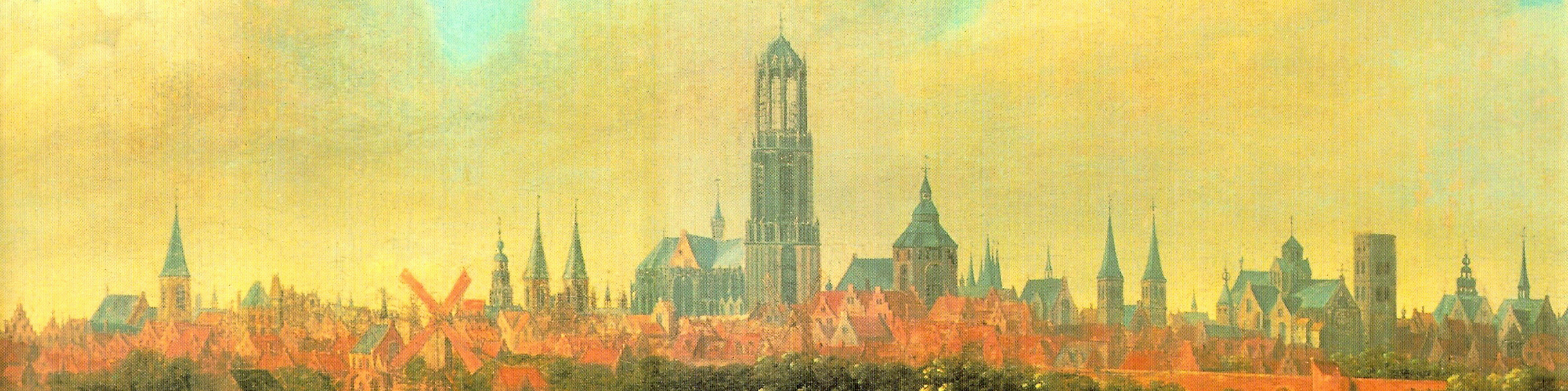
Panorama of Utrecht by Joost Cornelisz Droochsloot, ca. 1630 (Centraal Museum, Utrecht)
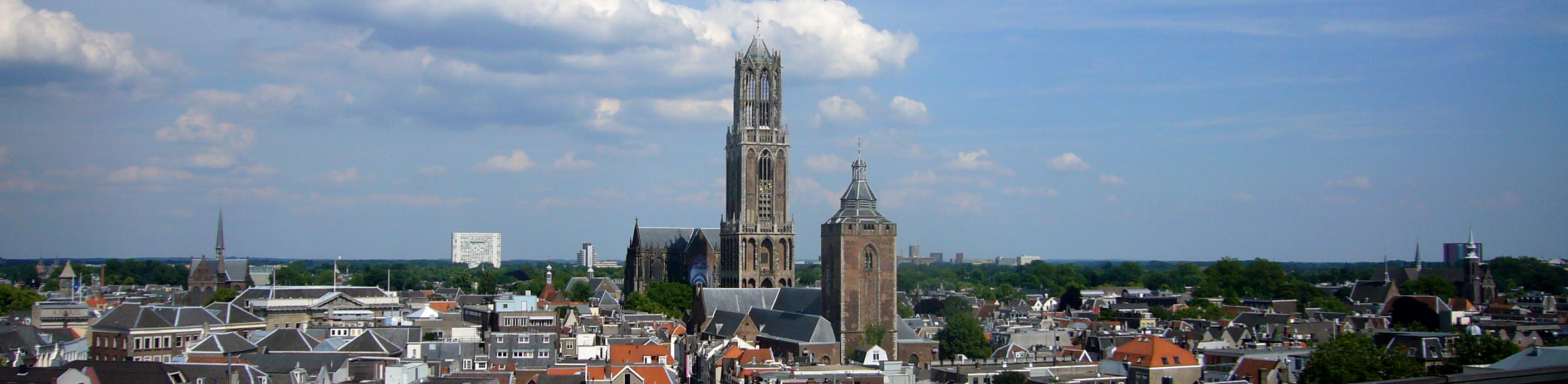
Panorama of Utrecht with the Dom and the Buurkerk, 2008

== See also ==
- List of carillons
- List of tallest structures built before the 20th century
