= Der Fluyten Lust-hof =

Collection of music for recorder by Jacob van Eyck

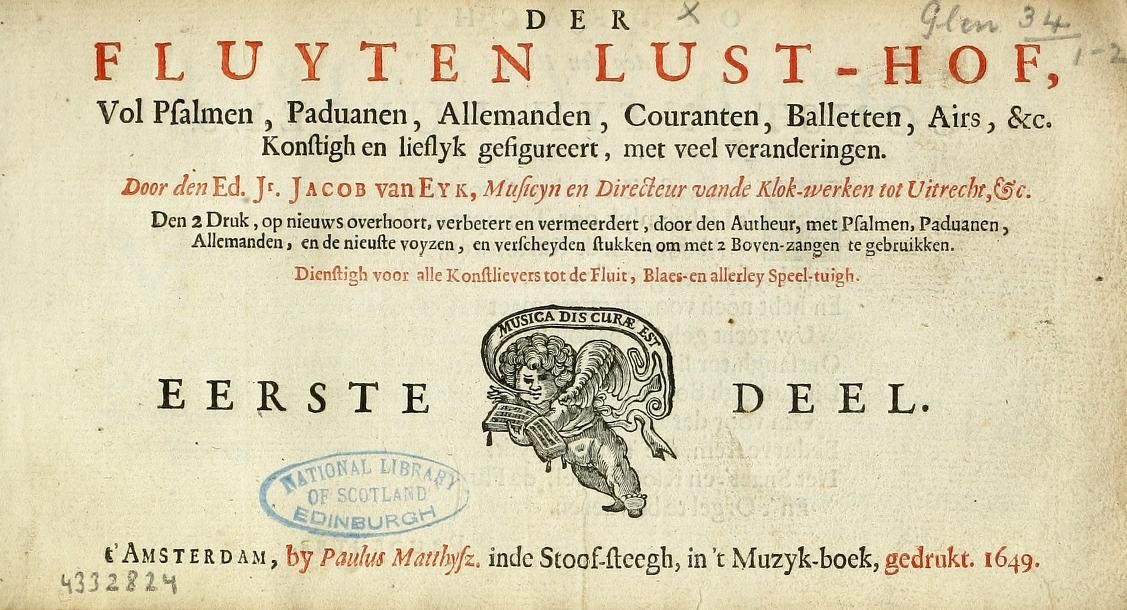
Der Fluyten Lust-Hof, title page of the first part, 1649

Der Fluyten Lust-hof (The Flute's Pleasure Garden, or Garden of Delights) is a two-volume collection of music for recorder by the Dutch nobleman and composer Jacob van Eyck. It is the largest collection of music for a single wind instrument ever published by a single composer.

Originally published in Utrecht during 1644, the collection was republished in four editions between 1646 and 1656. The collection includes material adapted from van Eyck's own carillon music, along with folk songs and religious music. The book was intended as an instructional text for amateur musicians, but the pieces are considered challenging by modern standards

== Publication history and contents ==
It was first published in 1644 with further editions in 1646, 1649, 1654, and 1656. The pieces include folk songs, dance tunes, church works, Psalms, and songs of the day, including material adapted from van Eyck's own carillon music.

== Indication of musical standards in Utrecht ==
Although written for amateur players, the standard of musicianship in Utrecht was clearly of a high order as the pieces are considered challenging by modern standards.
