= Johanna Hill and Johanna Sturdy =

English bell-makers (fl. 1440–1459)

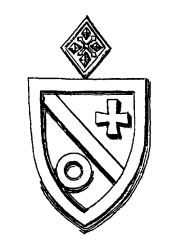
Johanna Hill's maker's mark

Johanna Hill (d. 1441) and Johanna Sturdy (fl. 1459) were English bell-makers. They both ran the same bell-foundry in Aldgate, London in the fifteenth century and produced church bells that were used all over the south of England.

== Johanna Hill ==
Johanna Hill, who may have been from Surrey, was married to bell-maker Richard Hill. When he died in May 1440, Johanna took over their foundry in the parish of St Botolph, Aldgate. She oversaw four apprentices and a household of twenty people. Seven of the bells she produced survive, bearing her stamp, which is a copy of her husband’s stamp surmounted by a lozenge containing a floret or cross, signalling that it belonged to a woman. Johanna Hill’s stamp is found on bells in Devon, Buckinghamshire, Essex, Hertfordshire, Suffolk and Sussex.

She died in May 1441, leaving the St Botolph bell-foundry to her daughter, also called Johanna, and Johanna’s husband Henry Jordan.

== Johanna Sturdy ==
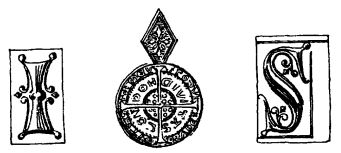
Johanna Sturdy's maker's marks

By the 1450s the St Botolph bell-foundry was owned by bellmaker John Sturdy alias Leicester and his wife Johanna Sturdy. (Note: Stahlschmidt assumed that the two names belonged to the same Johanna in successive marriages. However, Caroline Barron and Jennifer Ward have established that they are two separate women.) By 1459, John had died and Johanna had taken over the foundry, as shown by her correspondence about the warranty for a bell she was supplying to Faversham, Kent. Ten of her bells survive and, like Johanna Hill’s, bear a stamp which was her husband’s mark surmounted by a lozenge.
