= Bakenesserkerk =

Coordinates: 52°22′53″N 4°38′30″E

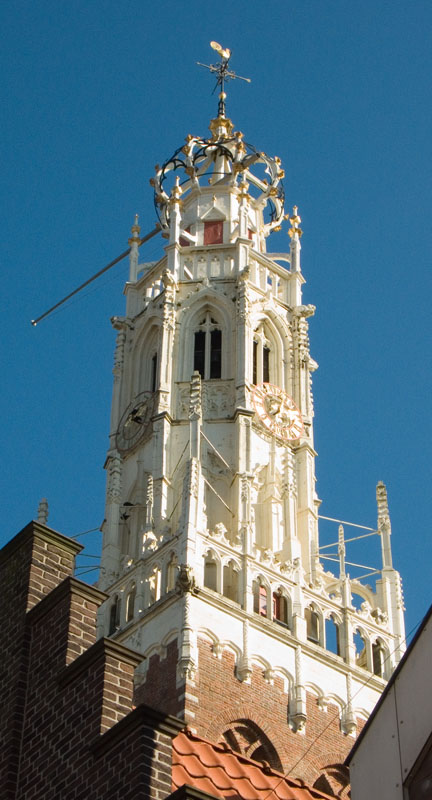
The sandstone tower of the Bakenesserkerk

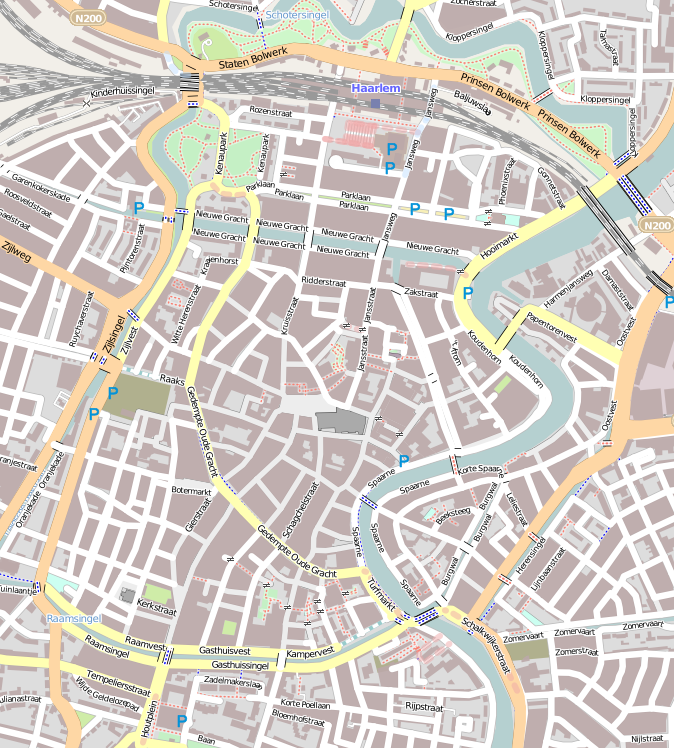
The Bakenesserkerk is located between the Bakenessergracht and the Vrouwestraat.

The Bakenesserkerk is a former church and seat of the local archeological workgroup in Haarlem, Netherlands, on the Vrouwestraat 10. Its characteristic white tower can be seen in cityscapes of Haarlem. The entrance is opposite the rear entrance to the Teylers Hofje.

== History ==
It was founded in the 13th century by William II of Holland as "Onze Lieve Vrouwenkapel", and the white sandstone tower was added in 1520. After the Siege of Haarlem when 1500 soldiers were held here before being killed by the Spanish after their victory, the church was used to store turf for fifty years. Inscribed above the 1620 doorway on the north side is the Latin text Si laudem nova qui struxerunt templa tulere cur non qui renovant et vetus hocce ferant 1639.

The church is currently in use as exhibition space for the workgroup of the Archeologisch Museum Haarlem.

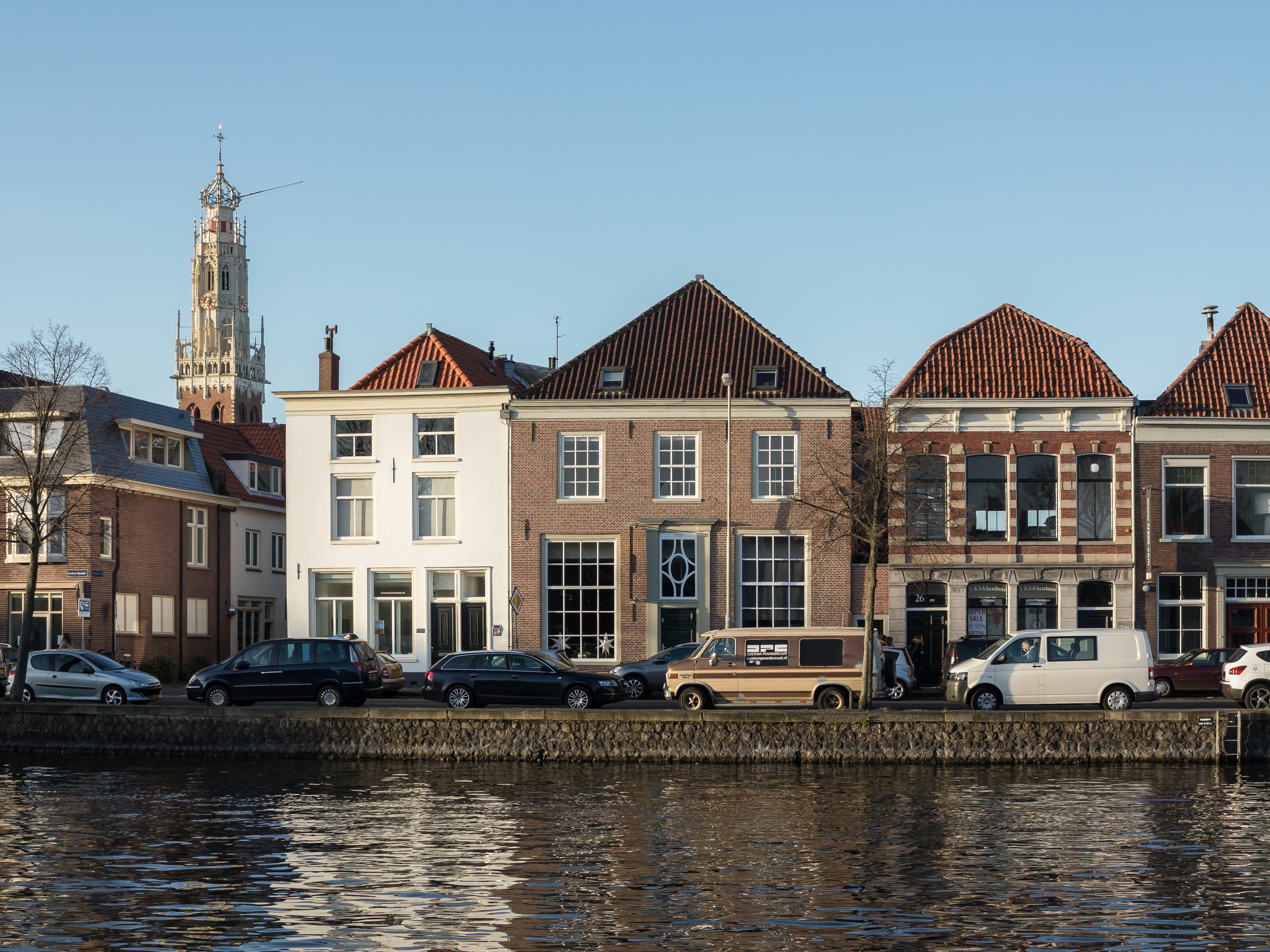
River (de Spaarne) with church (de Bakenesserkerk)

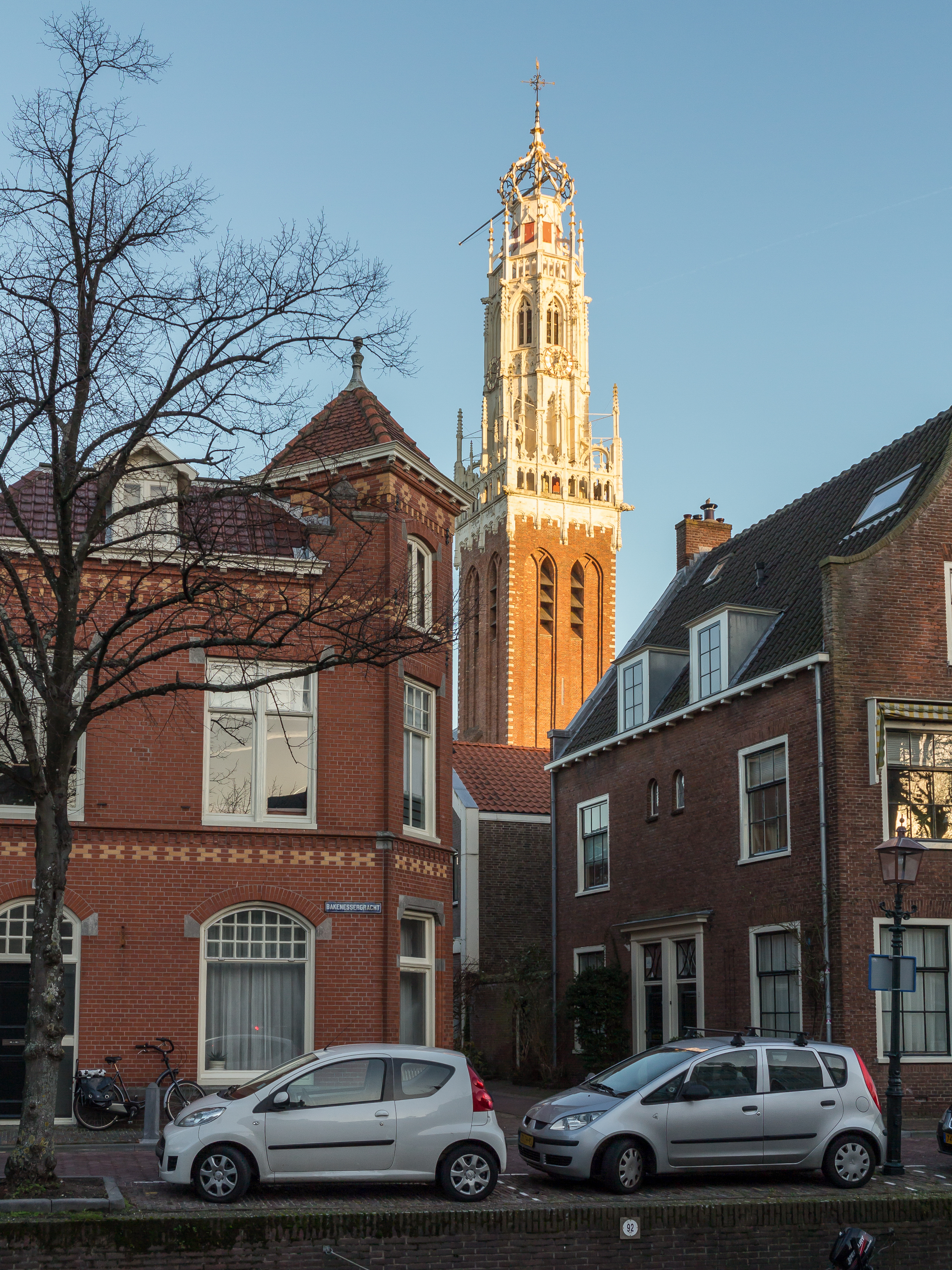
Churchtower (de Bakenesserkerk)

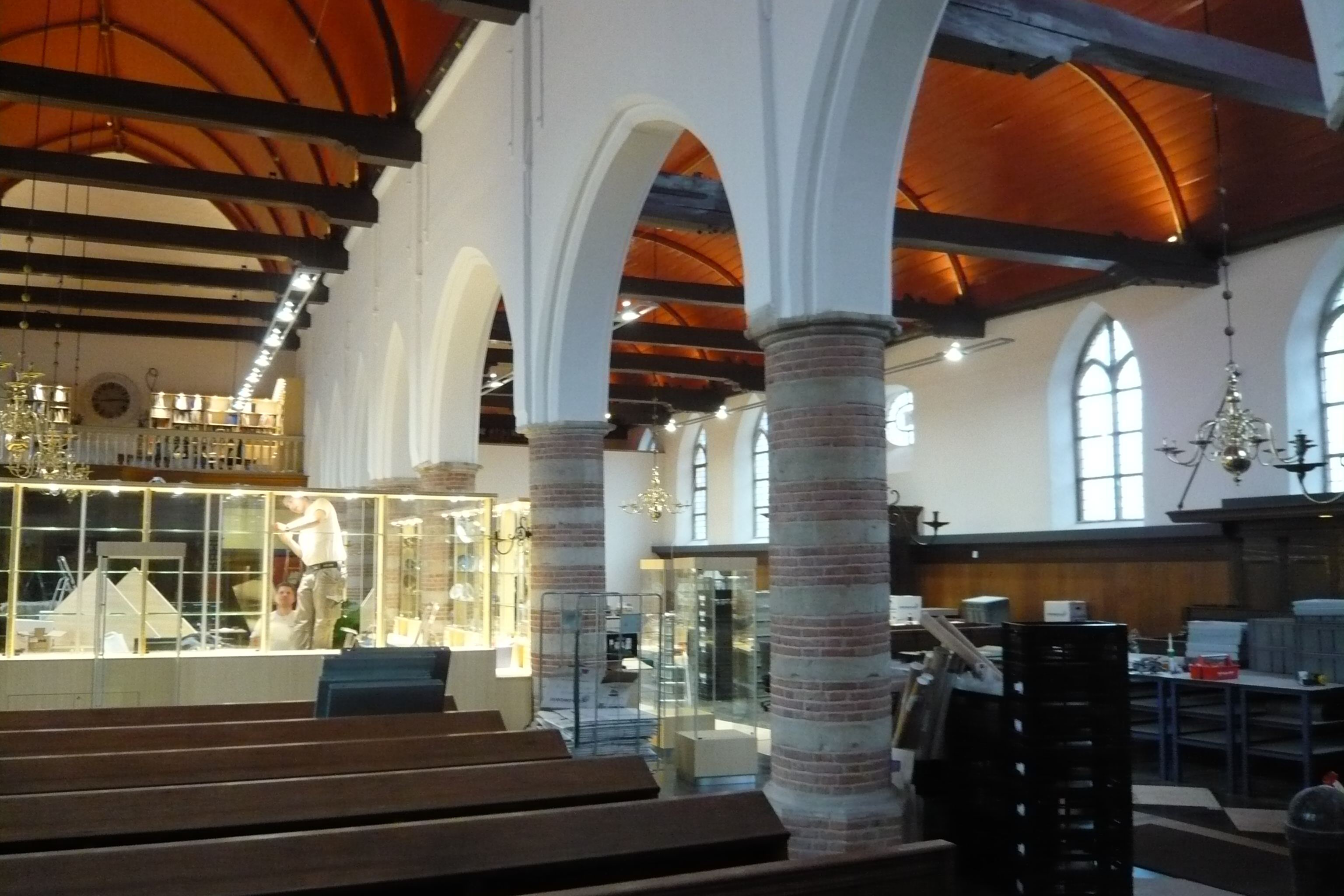
Interior during the installation of display cases

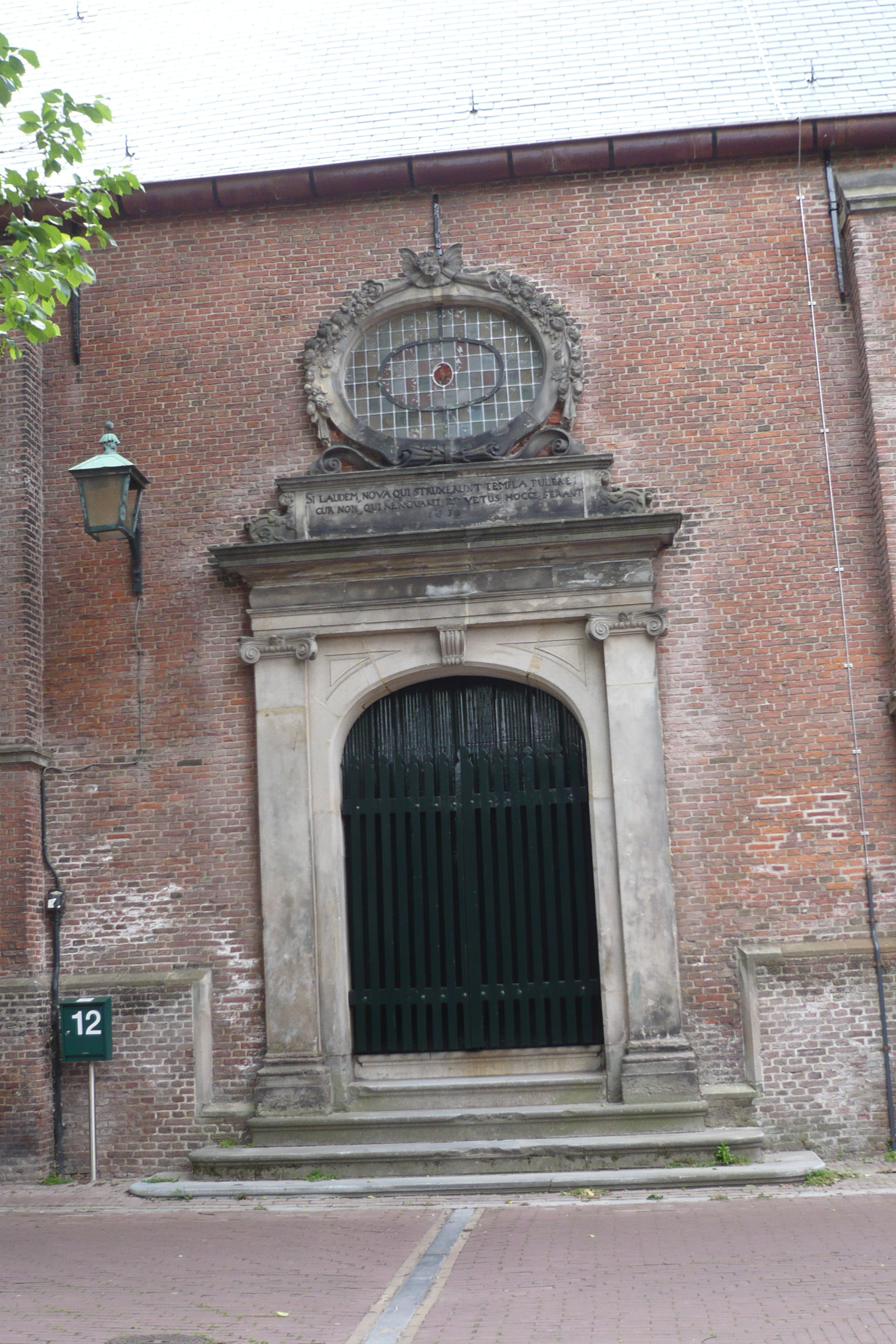
North entrance with 1620 decoration in the manner of Lieven de Key.

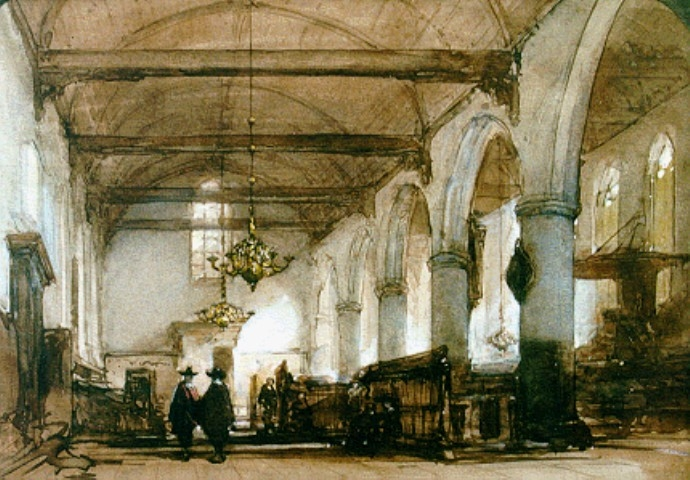
Interior in 1850 by Johannes Bosboom

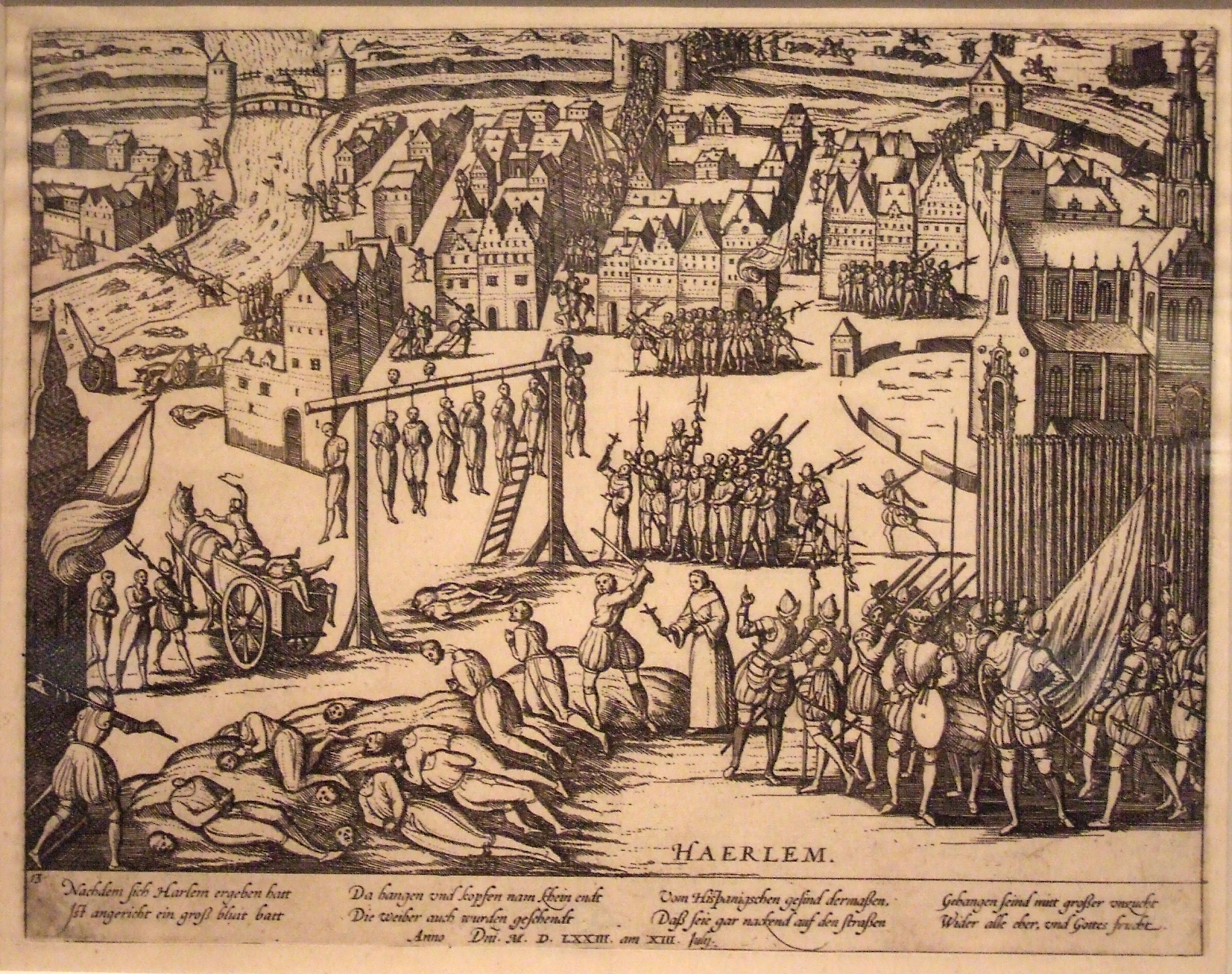
Haarlem soldiers being executed by the Spanish after the siege
