= List of carillons in Germany =

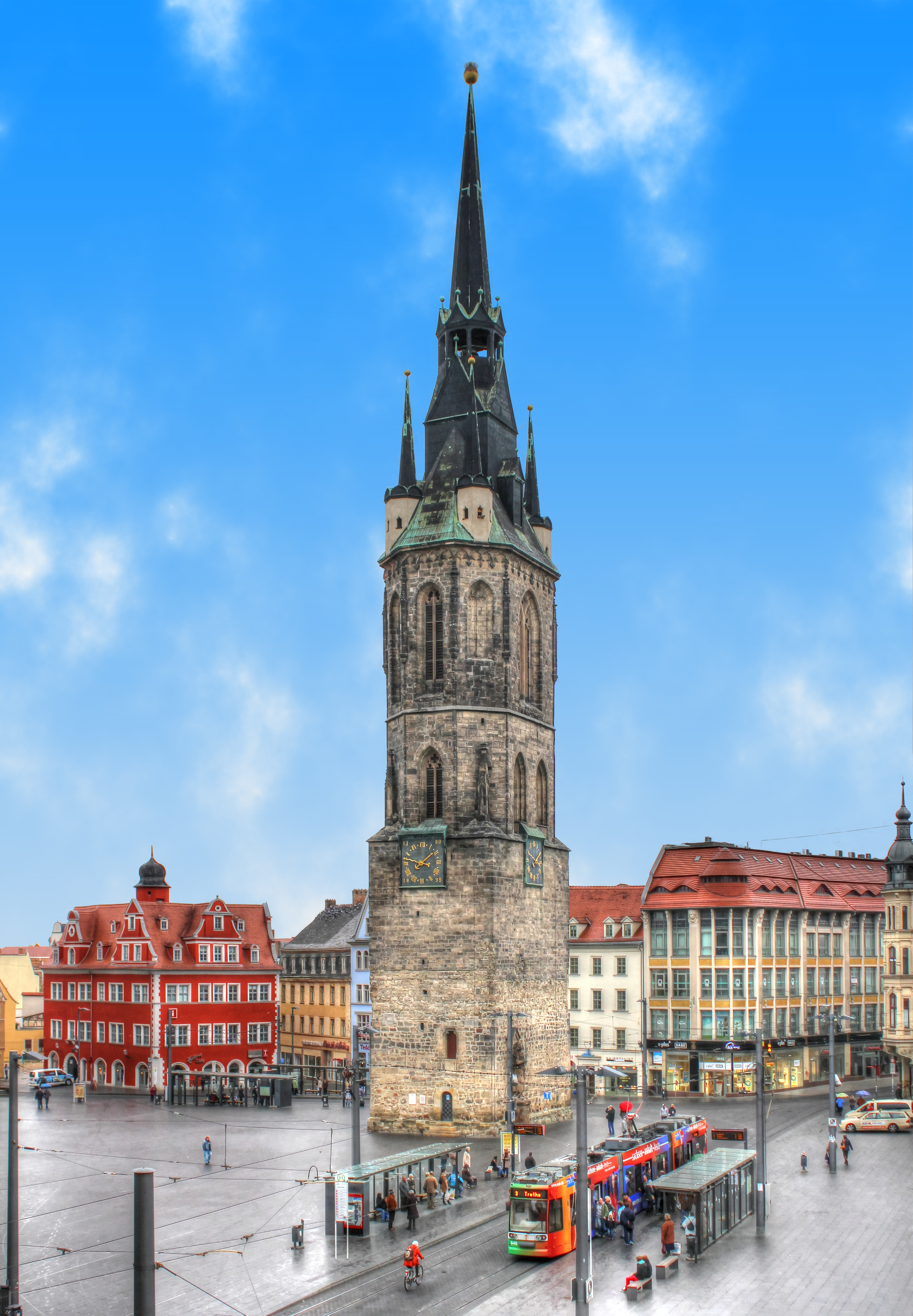
Germany's heaviest carillon is in Halle (Saale) with bells weighing more than 45,000 kg (99,000 lb) in total

Carillons, musical instruments of bells in the percussion family, are found throughout Germany. Several institutions maintain registries on the location and statistics of carillons. Some registries specialize in counting specific types of carillons. For example, the War Memorial and Peace Carillons registry counts instruments which serve as war memorials or were built in the name of promoting world peace (and tracks one in Germany); the World Carillon Federation counts carillons throughout the country, along with the rest of the world. In 2025, the casting of bells and playing music on bells was added to Germany's list of intangible cultural heritage.

The German Carillon Association counts carillons throughout Germany, and according to the organization, there are 49 in total. They are distributed across 41 cities; in four of them – Berlin, Bonn, Cologne, and Hamburg – there are more than one. The population has a wide range in total weights, with bourdons spanning from 20 kilograms (44 lb) in Altenburg and Schwerin to 8,056 kilograms (17,760 lb) in Halle (Saale). They also span a wide range of notes, from 23 in Bonn and Lößnitz up to 76 in Halle (Saale). The carillons were all exclusively constructed after 1900 by a mix of bellfounders, many of them German. The majority of carillons are transposing instruments, and often transpose such that the lowest note on the keyboard is B♭ or C. There are also two mobile carillons, which were constructed and are owned by two German bellfounders: Perner and Sandkuhl.

According to the World Carillon Federation, the carillons of Germany account for seven percent of the world's total.

== Criteria for inclusion ==
The World Carillon Federation defines a carillon as an instrument of at least 23 cast bronze bells hung in fixed suspension, played with a traditional keyboard of batons, and tuned in chromatic order so that they can be sounded harmoniously together. It may designate instruments of 15 to 22 bells built before 1940 as "historical carillons". Its member organizations – including for example the German Carillon Association – also define a carillon with those restrictions. This list contains only those carillons that meet the definition outlined by these organizations.

== List of carillons ==
List of carillons in Germany
Location		City	Bells	Bourdon weight		Total weight		Range and transposition	Bellfounder(s)	Ref.
Location		City	Bells	kg	lb	kg	lb	Range and transposition	Bellfounder(s)	Ref.
	Aachen Town Hall	Aachen	49	400	880	2,500	5,500	—N/a	Royal Eijsbouts 1978 (Note: Installed 1979)	
	Epiphany of the Lord Church	Altenburg	24	20	44	311	686	—N/a	Schilling 1981	
	Schloss Johannisburg	Aschaffenburg	48	270	600	2,100	4,600	Up 12 semitones	Royal Eijsbouts 1969	
	French Cathedral	Berlin	60	5,700	12,600	29,500	65,000	Up 1 semitone	Schilling / Pößneck 1987	
	St. Nicholas Church	Berlin	41	200	440	1,400	3,100	—N/a	Schilling 1987	
	Parochialkirche	Berlin	52	1,490	3,280	8,600	19,000	Up 4 semitones	Petit & Fritsen / Royal Eijsbouts 2016	
	Carillon in Berlin-Tiergarten	Berlin	68	7,800	17,200	48,000	106,000	—N/a	Royal Eijsbouts 1987	
	Bad Godesberg City Park	Bonn	23	37.6	83	291.1	642	Up 24 semitones	Royal Eijsbouts 1979	
	St. Joseph's Church	Bonn	62	2,300	5,100	10,200	22,500	Up 8 semitones	Schilling 1962	
	Buchen City Tower	Buchen	24	139	306	—N/a		Up 24 semitones	Royal Eijsbouts 2015	
	New Town Hall	Chemnitz	48	957	2,110	5,200	11,500	Up 5 semitones	Schilling 1978	
	Cologne City Hall	Cologne	48	2,500	5,500	12,500	27,600	None (concert pitch)	Royal Eijsbouts 1958	
	St. Maria in der Kupfergasse	Cologne	38	—N/a		—N/a		—N/a	Royal Eijsbouts 2010	
	Church of Saint Anne	Düren	37	640	1,410	3,508	7,734	Up 7 semitones	Petit & Fritsen 1964	
	St. Aldegundis	Emmerich am Rhein	43	905	1,995	7,000	15,000	Up 5 semitones	Petit & Fritsen 2000	
	Church of Our Lady	Eppingen	49	600	1,300	3,983	8,781	Up 5 semitones	Karlsruher 1987	
	St Bartholomew's Church	Erfurt	60	2,393	5,276	13,626	30,040	None (concert pitch)	Schilling 1979	
	Old St. Nicholas Church	Frankfurt	47	560	1,230	3,500	7,700	—N/a	Schilling 1939; Royal Eijsbouts 1957–97	
	Saints Philip and Jacob Church	Geisa	49	358	789	2,003	4,416	Up 10 semitones	Royal Eijsbouts 2003	
	Gera City Hall	Gera	37	45	99	1,024	2,258	Up 24 semitones	Schilling / Pößneck 1988	
	Gustav Adolf Stave Church	Goslar	49	300	660	2,000	4,400	(Range not available); Up 14 semitones	Schilling / Perner / Buer 2002–05	
	Red Tower	Halle (Saale)	76	8,056	17,760	45,980	101,370	—N/a	Schilling / Metz 1993	
	Christian's Church	Hamburg	42	1,100	2,400	5,400	11,900	Up 4 semitones	Schilling 1938	
	St. Nicholas Church	Hamburg	51	2,002	4,414	13,000	29,000	None (concert pitch)	Royal Eijsbouts 1992	
—N/a	Henrietten Foundation	Hanover	49	408	899	2,900	6,400	Up 13 semitones	Schilling 1960	
	Heidelberg City Hall	Heidelberg	26	60	130	800	1,800	Up 24 semitones	Schilling 1961	
	Herrenberg collegiate church	Herrenberg	50	392	864	2,510	5,530	Up 12 semitones	Royal Eijsbouts 2012	
	St. Martin's Church	Illertissen	51	400	880	2,600	5,700	Up 12 semitones	Royal Eijsbouts 2006	
	Kaiserslautern collegiate church	Kaiserslautern	47	2,000	4,400	10,000	22,000	—N/a	Bachert 2009	
	Karlskirche	Kassel	47	397	875	2,750	6,060	Up 10 semitones	Schilling 1957; Karlsruher 1989; Buer 1995	
	Kiel Monastery	Kiel	50	620	1,370	4,085	9,006		Bachert / Karlsruher 1999; Buer 2005	
	St. John's Church	Lößnitz	23	350	770	2,400	5,300	Up 10 semitones	Schilling 1939	
	St. Mary's Church	Lübeck	37	2,500	5,500	—N/a		None (concert pitch)	Schilling 1906; Rincker 2019	
	Magdeburg City Hall	Magdeburg	47	975	2,150	6,000	13,000	Up 5 semitones	Schilling / Apolda 1974	
	Melle Town Hall	Melle	37	293	646	1,767	3,896	—N/a	Royal Eijsbouts 2010	
	Mariahilfkirche	Munich	65	6,200	13,700	25,000	55,000	None (concert pitch)	Royal Eijsbouts / Czudnochowsky / Gloria 2012	
	Old Town Hall	Offenburg	25	25	55	425	937	—N/a	Schilling / Apolda / Pößneck 1989	
	Alter Friedhof	Potsdam	24	30	66	400	880	Up 36 semitones	Schilling 1985	
	Turmhurenmuseum	Rockenhausen	37	47	104	—N/a		—N/a	Royal Eijsbouts 2014	
	Fünfgiebelhaus	Rostock	32	50	110	533	1,175	—N/a	Schilling / Apolda 1986	
	Park Bergfried	Saalfeld	25	1,450	3,200	9,060	19,970	Up 3 semitones	Apolda 1924/1986	
	Church of the Assumption of the Virgin Mary	Schirgiswalde	29	—N/a		—N/a		—N/a	Schilling / Apolda 1991	
	Schwerin Town Hall	Schwerin	26	20	44	330	730	—N/a	Apolda 1988	
	St. Otto Church	Wechselburg	36	46	101	980	2,160	—N/a	Schilling / Apolda / Pößneck 1988	
—N/a	Old Schoolyard	Weilbach	39	240	530	2,032	4,480		Metz 2006	
	Marktkirche	Wiesbaden	49	2,200	4,900	11,071	24,407	????????	Hamm 1862; Rincker 1962; Royal Eijsbouts 1986	
	Neubaukirche	Würzburg	51	635	1,400	3,600	7,900	Up 9 semitones	Petit & Fritsen 2005	

== List of mobile carillons ==
List of mobile carillons in Germany
Name		City	Bells	Bourdon weight		Total weight		Range and transposition	Bellfounder(s)	Ref.
Name		City	Bells	kg	lb	kg	lb	Range and transposition	Bellfounder(s)	Ref.
	Perner Carillon	Passau	49	450	990	4,000	8,800	Up 12 semitones	Perner 2012	
—N/a	Sandkuhl Carillon	Rostock	37	265	584	1,798	3,964	Up 12 semitones	Sandkuhl 2004	

== See also ==
- Index of campanology articles
