= Mary Perry (disambiguation) =

Mary Perry (1943–2012) was an American volleyball player.

Mary Perry may also refer to:

- Mary Evans (basketball) (née Perry), American women's basketball coach and former basketball player
- Mary Jane Perry, American oceanographer
- Mary Antoinette Perry (1888–1946), American actress, producer, director, and administrator
- Mary Christine Hudson (née Perry), mother of Katy Perry
- Mary Perry Mesquita, birth name of Mary Mesquita Dahlmer (1897–1993), American carillonneur
- Mary Tautari (née Perry, ?–1906), New Zealand schoolteacher, interpreter, and postmaster
- Mary Chase Perry Stratton (née Perry, 1867–1961), American ceramic artist
- Mary Perry Stone (née Perry, 1909–2007), American painter, sculptor, and muralist

== See also ==
- Melvin W. and Mary Perry House
- Mary Perry Smith (1926–2015), American mathematics educator
