= Mary Mesquita Dahlmer =

American carillonneur (1897–1993)

- Born: Mary Perry Mesquita; October 12, 1897; Gloucester, Massachusetts, US
- Died: October 14, 1993 (aged 96); Gloucester, Massachusetts, US
- Occupation: Carillonneur
- Years active: 1922–1945

Mary Mesquita Dahlmer (born Mary Perry Mesquita; 12 October 1897 – 14 October 1993) was an American carillonneur, the first to be employed as one in the United States, and the first woman carillonneur in North America.

== Life and career ==
As a member of the Church of Our Lady of Good Voyage in Gloucester, Massachusetts, she helped raise funds to build the church's 23-bell Taylor carillon by selling flowers. The carillon was inaugurated on July 23, 1922, by church organist George B. Stevens. When he was unavailable to play for a wedding on July 30, Dahlmer was asked based on her abilities as a pianist to fill in for him. She was subsequently appointed carillonneur, and studied with Anton Brees and Kamiel Lefévere. She was often asked to demonstrate the carillon for visitors, and in the process performed for John D. Rockefeller Jr., Franklin Delano Roosevelt, and Mrs. Hugh Bancroft. She also had a career at the Frank E. Davis Fish Company. Dahlmer retired from her carillon post in 1945, after 25 years. In 1987, Dahlmer was elected an honorary member of The Guild of Carillonneurs in North America.
