= Carillon =

Musical instrument of bells

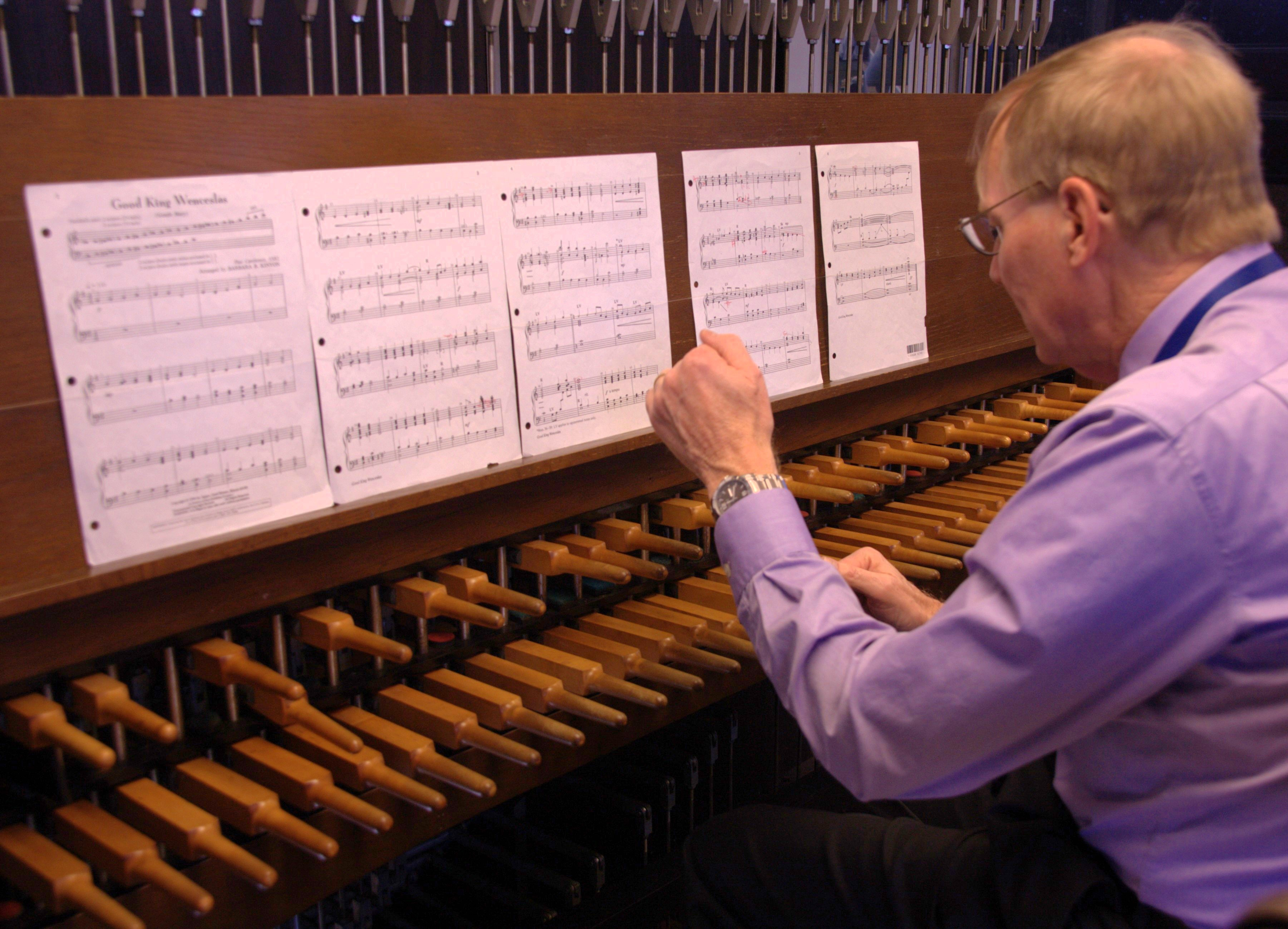
A carillonist plays the 56-bell carillon of the Plummer Building in Rochester, Minnesota, US

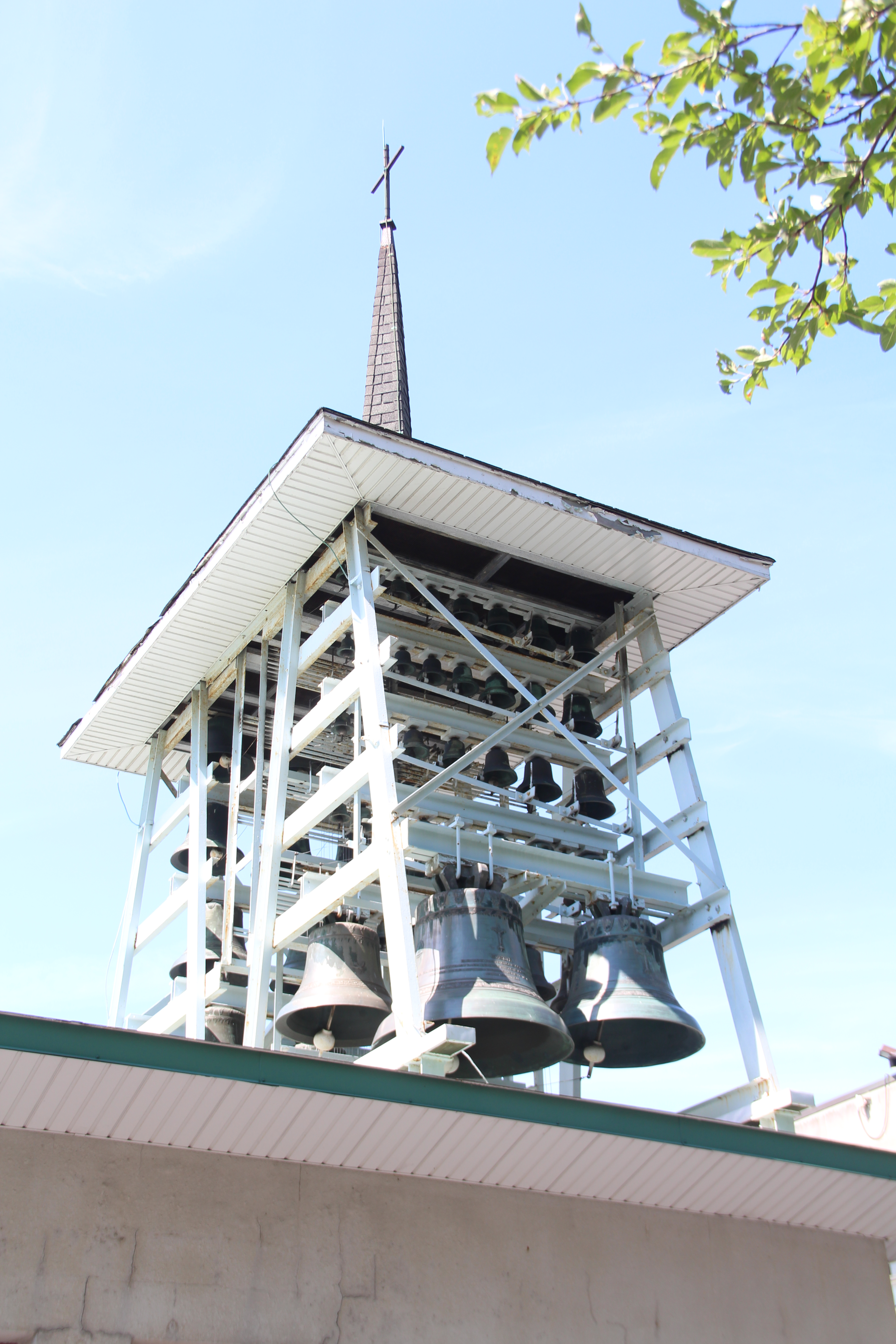
The 56-bell carillon of Saint Joseph's Oratory in Montreal, Quebec, Canada

A carillon (US: /ˈkærəlɒn/ KARR-ə-lon, UK: /kəˈrɪljən/ kə-RIL-yən) is a pitched percussion instrument that is played with a keyboard and consists of at least 23 bells. The bells are cast in bronze, hung in fixed suspension, and tuned in chromatic order so that they can be sounded harmoniously together. They are struck with clappers connected to a keyboard of wooden batons played with the hands and pedals played with the feet. Often housed in bell towers, carillons are usually owned by churches, universities, or municipalities. They can include an automatic system through which the time is announced and simple tunes are played throughout the day.

Carillons come in many designs, weights, sizes, and sounds. They are among the world's heaviest instruments, and the heaviest carillon weighs over 91 metric tons (100 short tons). Most weigh between 4.5 and 15 metric tons (5.0 and 16.5 short tons). To be considered a carillon, a minimum of 23 bells is needed; otherwise, it is called a chime. Standard-sized instruments have about 50, and the world's largest has 77 bells. The appearance of carillons depends on the number and weight of the bells and the tower in which they are housed. They may be found in towers that are free-standing or connected to a building. The bells of a carillon may be directly exposed to the elements or hidden inside the structure of their towers.

The origins of the carillon can be traced to the Low Countries—present-day Belgium, the Netherlands, and the French Netherlands—in the 16th century. The modern carillon was invented in 1644 when Jacob van Eyck and the Hemony brothers cast the first tuned carillon. The instrument experienced a peak until the late 18th century, a decline during the French Revolution, a revival in the late 19th century, a second decline during the First and Second World Wars, and a second revival thereafter. UNESCO has designated 56 belfries in Belgium and France as a World Heritage Site and recognized the carillon culture of Belgium as an intangible cultural heritage.

According to counts by various registries, about 700 carillons exist worldwide. Most are in and around the Low Countries, though nearly 200 have been constructed in North America. Almost all extant carillons were constructed in the 20th century. Additionally, about 500 "non-traditional" carillons are known that most registries do not consider to be carillons due to some component of their action being electrified or computerized. A plurality of them is located in the United States, and most of the others are in Western Europe. A few "traveling" or "mobile" carillons are fixed to a frame that enables them to be transported.

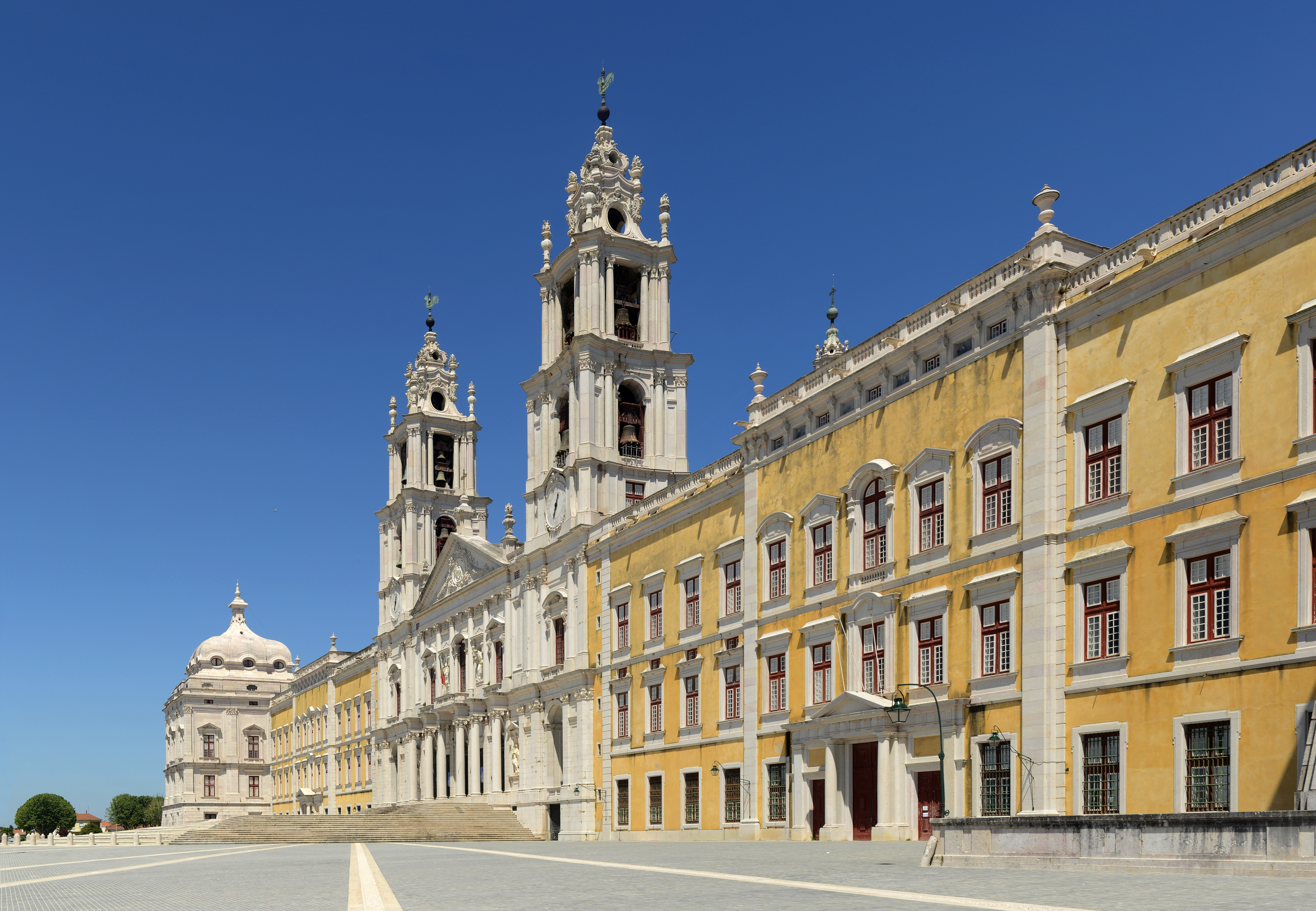
Mafra carillons at the Palace of Mafra, Portugal, the world's largest carillon ensemble

The title of "world's largest carillon by number of bells" is shared between two instruments: the carillon of the Kirk in the Hills Presbyterian Church in Bloomfield Hills, Michigan, US, and the carillon at the Daejeon Institute of Science and Technology in Daejeon, South Korea; both have 77 bells. The largest carillon ensemble in the world is the Mafra carillons, located at the Palace of Mafra, Portugal, comprising a total of 120 bells across its two towers, each approximately 68 metres (223 ft) high, and forming part of a UNESCO World Heritage Site.

== Etymology and terminology ==
The word carillon is a loanword from French dating to the late 18th century. It is derived from Old French carignon (an alteration of quarregon) 'a set of four bells'. The word quarregon originates from Latin quaternionem 'set of four'; from quater 'four times'. The word carillon is often stated to have referred originally to a set of four forestrike bells, whose melodies announced the time signal of public hour bells, but this is not confirmed by archival sources. Some convincing evidence shows that the term referred initially to the medieval custom of chiming on sets of four church bells by pulling the clappers by means of ropes. In German, as well as using the French term, a carillon is sometimes called a Glockenspiel (lit. 'bells set'). This should not be confused with the identically named glockenspiel, which itself is sometimes called a carillon in French. Dutch speakers use the word beiaard, which has an uncertain etymology.

A musician who plays the carillon is commonly called a carillonneur (US: /ˌkɛrələˈnɜːr/ KERR-ə-lə-NUR, UK: /kəˌrɪljəˈnɜːr/ kə-RIL-yə-NUR), also lent from French. It and carillon were adopted by English speakers after the introduction of the instrument to British troops following the War of the Spanish Succession in the 18th century. Though the French word carillonneur literally refers to carillon players who are men, the French carillonneuse to denote women is not used in English. Another common term is the English carillonist, which some players of the carillon have wished to replace carillonneur because of the former's gender inclusivity, simple spelling, and unambiguous pronunciation. In 2018, the World Carillon Federation adopted carillonist as the preferred term for its communications.

== Characteristics ==
=== Construction ===
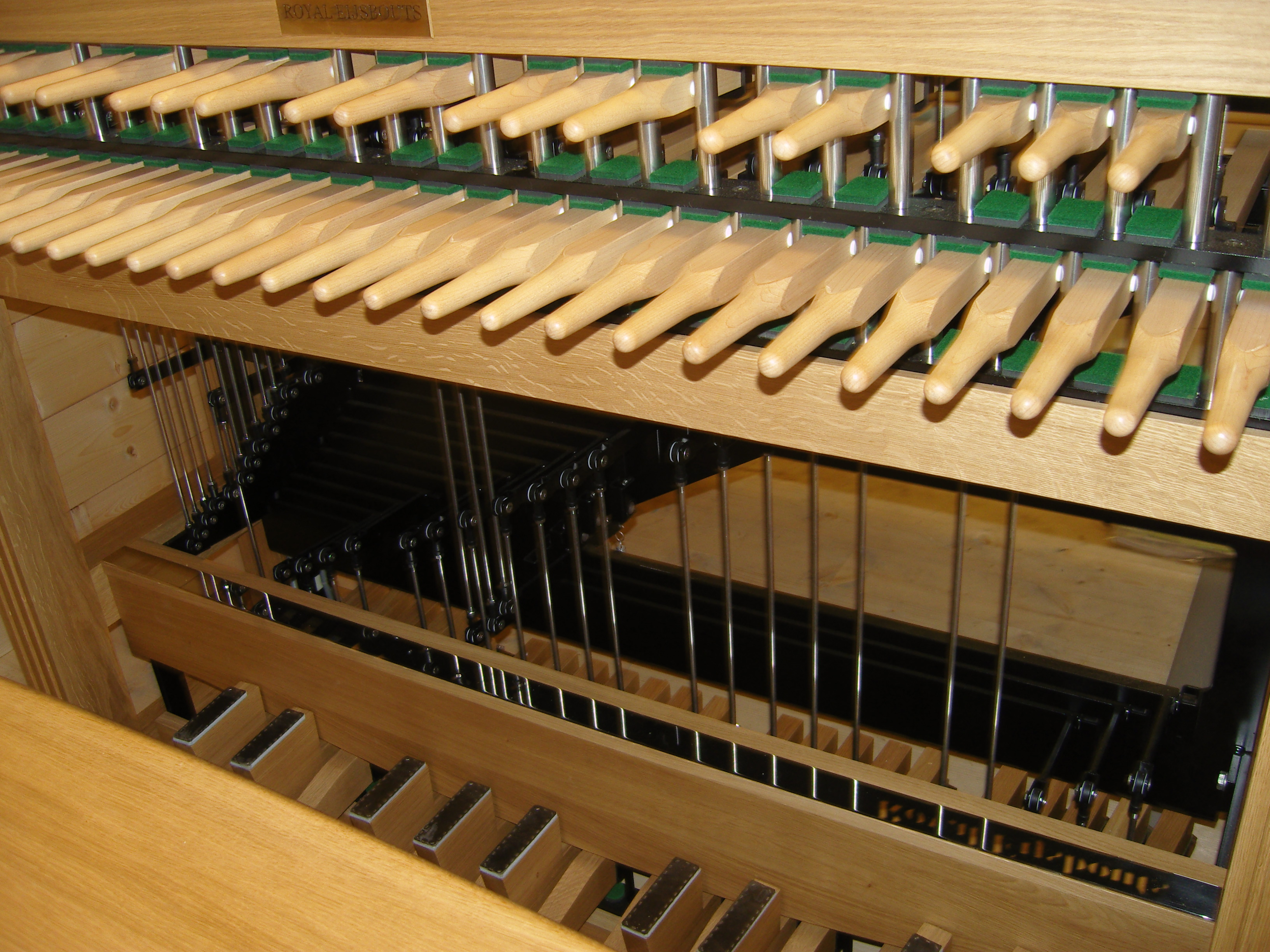
Console of the carillon at the Church of the Sacred Heart of Cholet in Maine-et-Loire, France

The carillon is a keyboard instrument. Though it shares similarities with other instruments in this category, such as the organ or pedal piano, its playing console is unique. Playing is done with the player's hands on a manual keyboard composed of rounded, wooden batons. The manual has short chromatic keys (i.e. "black keys") raised above the diatonic keys ("white keys") and arranged like a piano, but they are spaced far apart, and the chromatic keys are raised above the rest, about 10 cm (4 in). To operate, the keys are depressed with a closed fist. The lowest one-and-a-half to two-and-a-half octaves of the manual are connected to a pedal keyboard played with the feet. The connection is direct, meaning that when a pedal is pressed, its corresponding key on the manual is pulled down with it. Since the mid-20th century, two keyboard design standards have competed for a carillon's console: the North American standard and the North European standard. They differ over several design elements, such as whether the outer pedals curve toward the center or the specific distance a key is depressed. In 2006, the World Carillon Federation developed the WCF Keyboard 2006, which is a compromise between the two standards. The organization recommends that its keyboard standard be used as a guideline when constructing new carillons or renovating existing keyboards.

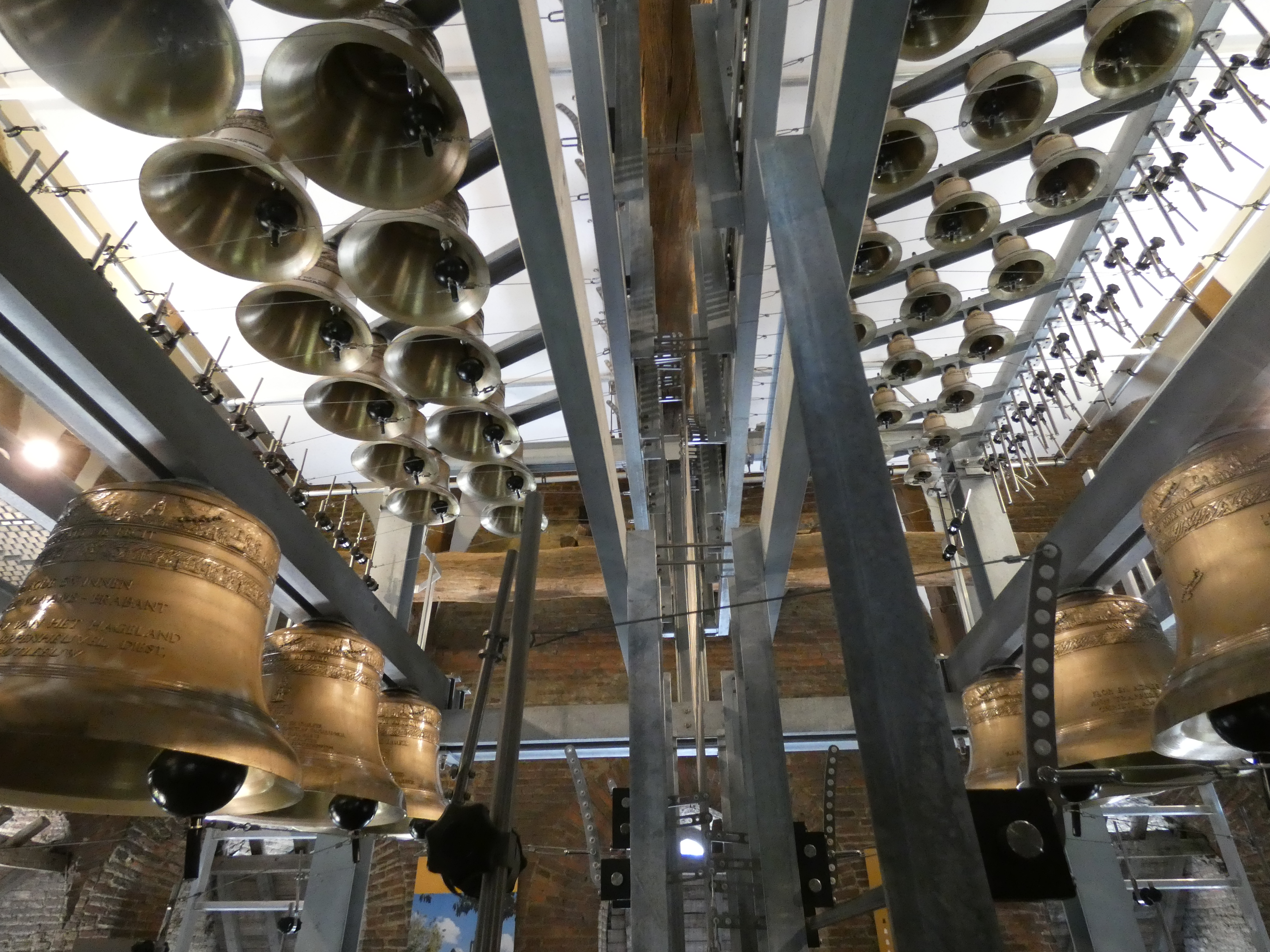
View of the bells and transmission system of the 49-bell Aarschot Peace Carillon in Belgium

Each key is connected to a transmission system by a wire, usually made of stainless steel. When a particular key is depressed, it pulls on the wire, which after interacting with other wires and pulleys, causes a clapper to swing towards the inner wall of the key's corresponding bell. At rest, these clappers are about 2 to 4 cm (0.8 to 1.6 in) away from the bell wall. Small bells are fitted with springs to pull their clappers back immediately after the stroke, so that the bell is not sounded more than once with each keystroke. This is not necessary for large bells, which have sufficiently heavy clappers. Immediately above each key is a wire adjuster called a turnbuckle. These allow the performer to adjust the length of the wire, which often changes with temperature fluctuations.

The carillon's cast-bronze, cup-shaped bells are housed at the top of a tower in a structure typically made of steel or wooden beams. The arrangement of the bells depends on the space, height, and construction of the tower, and the number and size of bells. When the heaviest bells are especially large, they are usually placed below the playing cabin to achieve a better tonal distribution. The bells do not move during operation, only the clappers. With some instruments, the heaviest bells may be outfitted with a mechanism enabling them to swing.

=== Mechanization with clock and playing drum ===
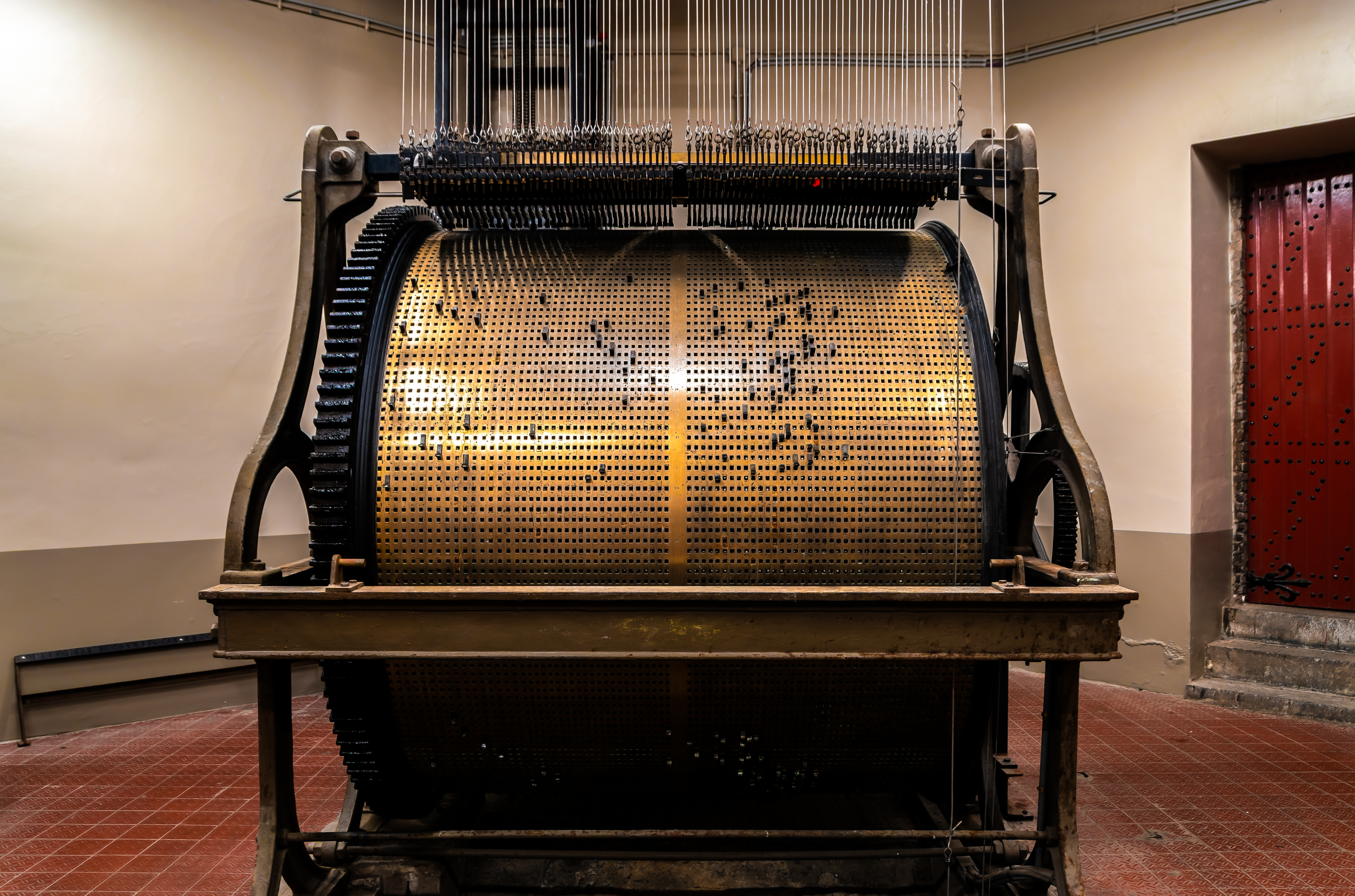
Playing drum in the Belfry of Ghent, Belgium

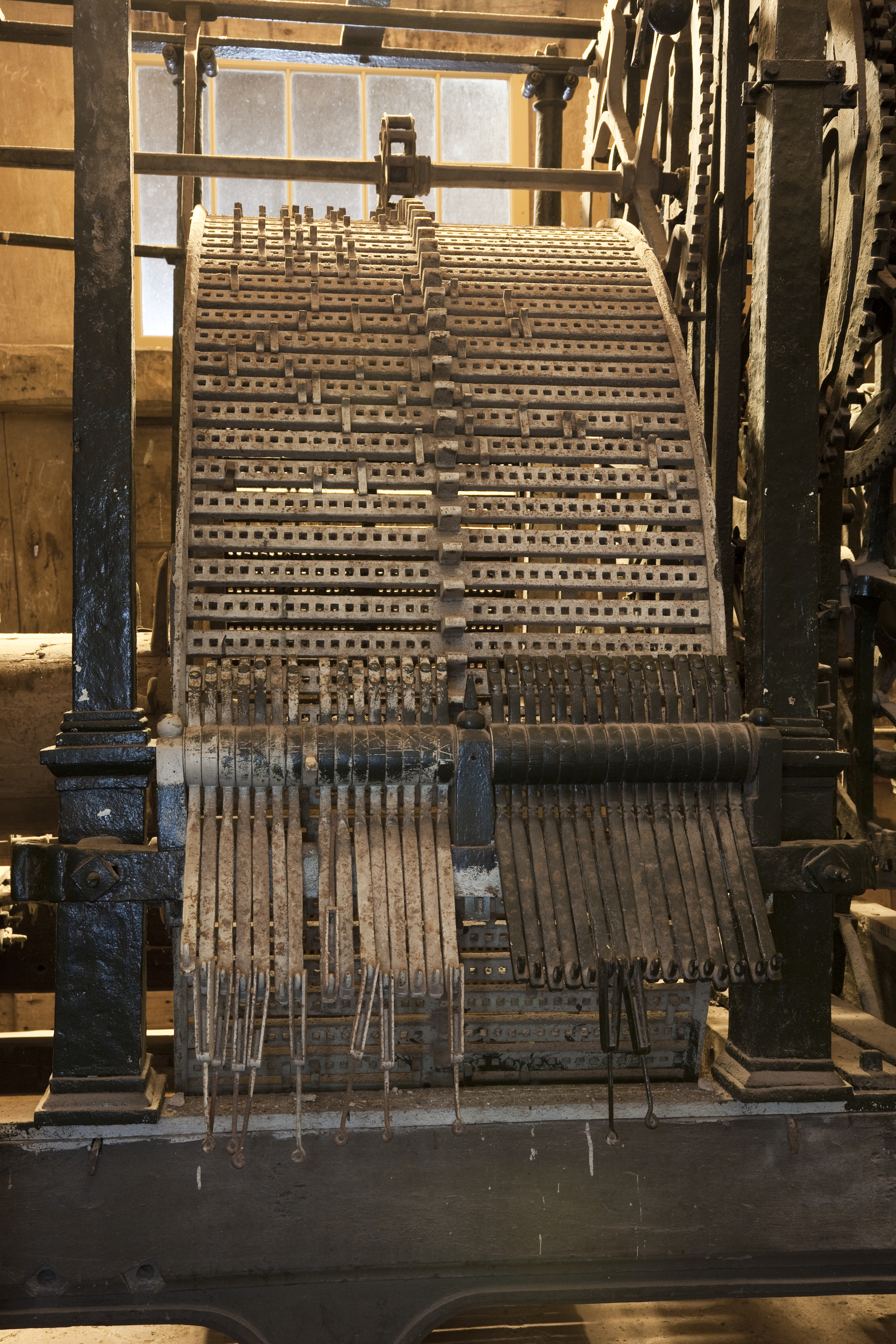
Front of the 16th-century clockwork and playing drum in the Catharijnekerk in Brielle, Netherlands

Carillons may also feature an automatic mechanism by which simple tunes or the Westminster Quarters are played on the lower bells. The mechanism on European carillons is often a playing drum, which is a large metal cylinder connected to a clock mechanism. Metal pegs are screwed onto the outside of the drum. When the clock mechanism sets the drum in motion, the pegs catch onto levers, connected to hammers that rest just a short distance from the outside of the bell. The hammers are briefly raised, and then fall onto the bell as the peg continues to rotate away from the lever. The pegs are arranged such that simple tunes can be programmed to play at specific quarter hours. In North America, automatic-playing drum systems are not common; instead, carillons may have pneumatic systems, which ring the instrument.

=== Sound ===
Carillons produce sound by striking stationary bells, categorizing them as percussion idiophones in the Hornbostel–Sachs classification of musical instruments (111.242.222 – sets of bells with internal strikers). Carillon bells are made of bell bronze, a specialized copper–tin alloy used for its above-average rigidity and resonance. A bell's profile (shape) and weight determine its note and the quality of its tone. Therefore, apart from changes in its profile, such as chipping or corrosion, a bell will never lose its original sound. It produces a sound with overtones, also known as partial tones, which are not necessarily harmonically related. To produce a pleasing, harmonically related series of tones, the bell's profile must be carefully adjusted. Bellfounders typically focus on five principal tones when tuning, most notably the minor third overtone called the tierce, which gives rise to the unique sound of carillons and has been the subject of further research, such as the major third bell. Since the casting process does not reliably produce perfectly tuned bells, they are cast slightly thicker and metal is shaved off with a lathe. On older European carillons, bells were tuned with each other using the meantone temperament tuning system. Modern carillons, particularly those in North America, are tuned to equal temperament.

Carillon sound sample
"O Canada" and "God Save the King"
The Peace Tower Carillon at the Canadian parliament, playing on its opening day, Canada Day 1927

Fixed Pattern of Distant Stars
The Class of 1928 Carillon at University of California, Berkeley, playing in 2011

The carillon has a dynamic range similar to a piano, if not more versatile. Through variation of touch, performers can express many volumes. The larger the bell, the larger its dynamic range. Bigger bells will also sound naturally louder than smaller, higher-pitched bells.

Along with pipe organs, carillons are among the world's heaviest musical instruments. Most carillons weigh (counting only the weight of the bells) between 4.5 and 15 metric tons (5.0 and 16.5 short tons), with extremes ranging from very light 1 metric ton (1.1 short tons) instruments to the world's heaviest at over 91 metric tons (100 short tons)—the Laura Spelman Rockefeller Memorial Carillon of the Riverside Church in New York City, US. Its bourdon, or largest bell, is the largest tuned bell ever cast for a carillon. It sounds a full octave below most other bourdons. The entire ensemble of fixed and swinging bells, clappers, and steel framework weighs more than 226 metric tons (249 short tons).

=== Range ===
A carillon's range is determined by the number of bells it has, which usually depends on funds available for the creation of the instrument; more money allows more bells to be cast, especially the larger, more costly ones. A carillon, as generally accepted, must have a minimum of 23 bells, or else it is called a chime. No standard pitch range for the carillon has been established, so several subcategories are used to categorize them:

- Carillons with 23 to 27 bells and 35 to 39 bells are classified as two-octave and three-octave carillons, respectively. Players of these instruments often use music written specifically for the limited ranges.
- A "concert" or "standard" carillon typically has 45 to 50 bells, or a range of about four octaves.
- Carillons with more than 50 bells are often referred to as "great" or "grand" carillons.
- Carillons of 15 to 22 bells, which were built before 1940, may be classified as "historical carillons" by the World Carillon Federation.

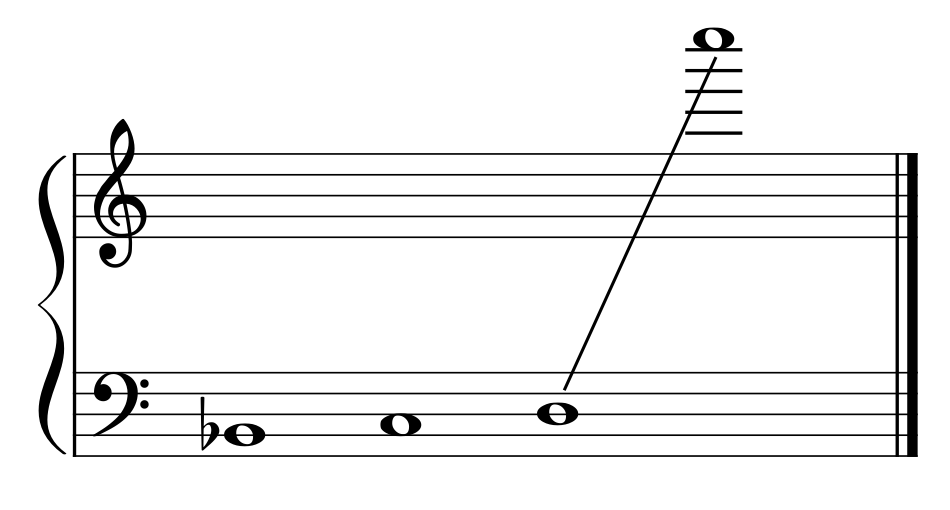
The range of a 49-bell carillon with a missing C♯ bell and additional B♭ bell in the bass

The same range as the above image represented on a piano keyboard (with middle C marked in yellow)

Since a carillon is seldom played in concert with other instruments, its bourdon may be any pitch—whichever is advantageous for the location and funds available; to simplify the writing and playing of music, keyboards often have a C-compass. As a result, many carillons are transposing instruments, especially those that are small, have many bells, or were constructed on limited funds. The transposition can vary from down a perfect fourth to up an octave. In North America, increasing numbers of new carillons have been installed in concert pitch as a result of the desire to establish the carillon as a full-fledged concert instrument.

Many carillons, according to a C-compass, are missing the lowest C♯ and E♭ bells (equating to the second- and fourth-largest bells if they were included). The reason is often financial; by omitting these bells, the construction of a carillon can be reduced significantly, sometimes by 20% for large installations. Since the early 1900s, European installations often reintroduce the E♭ bell, and instead of adding the C♯ bell, they include a B♭ bell (which is a major second below the C-compass bell).

== History ==
=== Origins ===
The carillon originated from two earlier functions of bells: ringing bells to send messages or to indicate the time of day.

Bellringers attached ropes to the clappers of swinging bells and rang them while stationary in a technique called chiming. Chiming bells gave the ringer more control compared to swinging bells, so was used to send messages to those within earshot. For example, sounding bells was often used to warn of a fire or impending attack. At celebratory events, a bellringer could gather ropes together to chime multiple bells in rhythmic patterns. By the end of the 15th century, chimers are recorded to have used their technique to play music on bells. A 1478 chronicle recounts a man in Dunkirk having made a "great innovation in honor of God" by playing melodies on bells. Another one recounts in 1482 a jester from Aalst playing bells in Antwerp with ropes and batons, the latter term suggesting the existence of a keyboard.

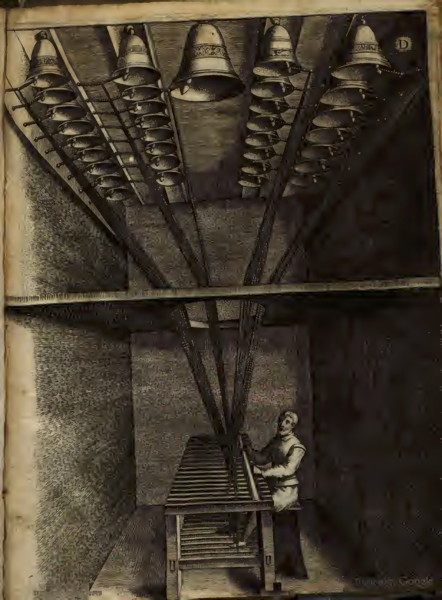
Oldest known depiction of a person playing a carillon, from De Campanis Commentarius (1612) by Angelo Rocca

In the 14th century, the newly developed escapement technology for mechanical clocks spread throughout European clock towers and gradually replaced the water clock. Since the earliest clocks lacked faces, they announced the time by striking a bell a number of times corresponding to the hour. Eventually, these striking clocks were modified to make a warning signal just before the hour count to draw the attention of listeners to the upcoming announcement. This signal is called the forestrike (Dutch: voorslag). Originally, the forestrike consisted of striking one or two bells, and the systems slowly grew in complexity. By the middle of the 15th century, forestrikes, with three to seven bells, could play simple melodies.

As late as 1510, these two functions were combined into one primitive carillon in the Oudenaarde Town Hall. One set of nine bells was connected to both a keyboard and the clock's forestrike. The Low Countries—present-day Belgium, the Netherlands, and the French Netherlands—were most interested in the potential of using bells to make music. In this region, bellfounding had reached an advanced stage relative to other regions in Europe.

=== Development ===
The new instrument developed in the favorable conditions in the Low Countries during the 17th century. Bellfounders found increased financial and technological support as the region traded by sea through ports. Moreover, the political situation under Margaret of Austria and Holy Roman emperor Charles V brought relative wealth and power to cities. Carillons quickly became a fashionable symbol of civic prestige. Cities and towns competed against one another to possess the largest, highest-quality instruments. The demand was met by a successful industry of bellfounding families, notably the Waghevens and Vanden Gheyns. Together, they produced over 50 carillons during the 16th and early 17th centuries. By 1600, the primitive carillon had become an established feature of the region.

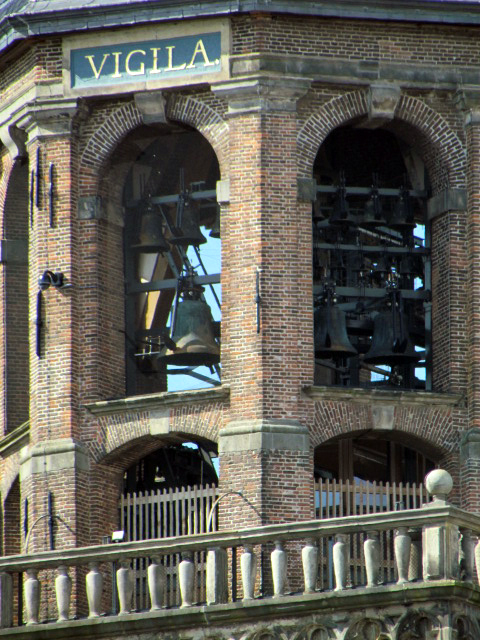
A Hemony carillon hangs in the tower of St. Lebuinus Church in Deventer, Netherlands; it was cast in Zutphen in 1647.

A critical development for the modern carillon occurred in the 17th century, which involved a partnership between Pieter and François Hemony and Jacob van Eyck. The Hemony brothers were prominent bellfounders known for their precise tuning technique. Van Eyck was a renowned blind carillonneur of Utrecht, who was commissioned by several Dutch cities to maintain and make improvements to their clock chimes and carillons. He was particularly interested in the sounds of bells. In 1633, he developed the ability to isolate and describe a bell's five main overtones and discovered a bell's partial tones can be tuned harmoniously with each other by adjusting the bell's thickness. The Hemony brothers were commissioned in 1644 to cast 19 bells for Zutphen's Wijnhuistoren with Van Eyck as their consultant. By tuning the bells with the advice from Van Eyck, they created the first carillon by the modern definition. According to carillonneur John Gouwens, the quality of the bells was so impressive that Van Eyck recommended casting a full two octaves, or 23 bells. This range has been considered the standard minimum range for carillons ever since. During the next 36 years, the Hemony brothers produced 51 carillons. Carillon culture experienced a peak around this time and until the late-18th century.

=== Decline ===
The French Revolution had far-reaching consequences on the Low Countries and the carillon. France conquered and annexed the Austrian Netherlands in 1795 and the United Provinces in 1810. After publishing instructions for extracting copper from bell bronze, France sought to dismantle local carillons to reduce its copper shortage. Carillon owners resisted, for example, by petitioning the new governments to declare their instruments as "culturally significant" or by disconnecting the bells and burying them in secret. During this period, as many as 110 carillons existed. About 50 of them were destroyed as a result of war, fire, and dismantling. The majority were melted down to produce cannons for the French Revolutionary Wars.

Between 1750 and the end of the 19th century, interest in the carillon declined greatly. An increasing number of households had access to grandfather clocks and pocket watches, which eroded the carillon's monopoly on announcing the time. As a musical instrument, the carillon lagged behind during the Romantic era, which featured music of a wandering, story-like nature. Many carillons were tuned using meantone temperament, which meant they were not suited for the chromaticism of the newer musical styles. The production of new musical works for the instrument essentially came to a standstill. The standard skill level of carillonneurs had also dropped significantly, so much so that in 1895, the music publisher Schott frères issued Matthias Vanden Gheyn's 11 carillon preludes for piano with a foreword claiming "no carillonneur of our time knows how to play them on the carillon". Also, with a reduced demand for new carillons, the tuning techniques developed by the Hemony brothers, but not Van Eyck's underlying theory, were forgotten. Subsequent carillons were generally inferior to earlier installations.

=== Revival ===
In the early 1890s, an English change ringer and canon Arthur Simpson published a set of articles on bell tuning, where he argued bell founders had been complacent with their poor tuning methods and proposed solutions to the existing problems. John William Taylor, who had been trying to replicate the tuning techniques of the Hemony brothers and the Vanden Gheyns at his foundry, began working with Simpson. In 1904, they founded the first tuned bells in over a century. The rediscovery initiated a revival of carillon building.

In Mechelen, Belgium, Jef Denyn was a major figure in the carillon's revival as a musical instrument. In 1887, after his father had become completely blind, Denyn took over as the city carillonneur and was responsible for playing the carillon in the tower of St. Rumbold's Cathedral. From the beginning of his career, Denyn advocated for better playability of the instrument. He further developed the tumbler rack system of transmission cables that his father had installed on the cathedral carillon. This allowed the player to have better control over dynamic variations, fast musical passages, and tremolos. Tremolos offered a solution to a Romantic-era limitation of the carillon: its inability to expressively sustain the sound of individual notes.

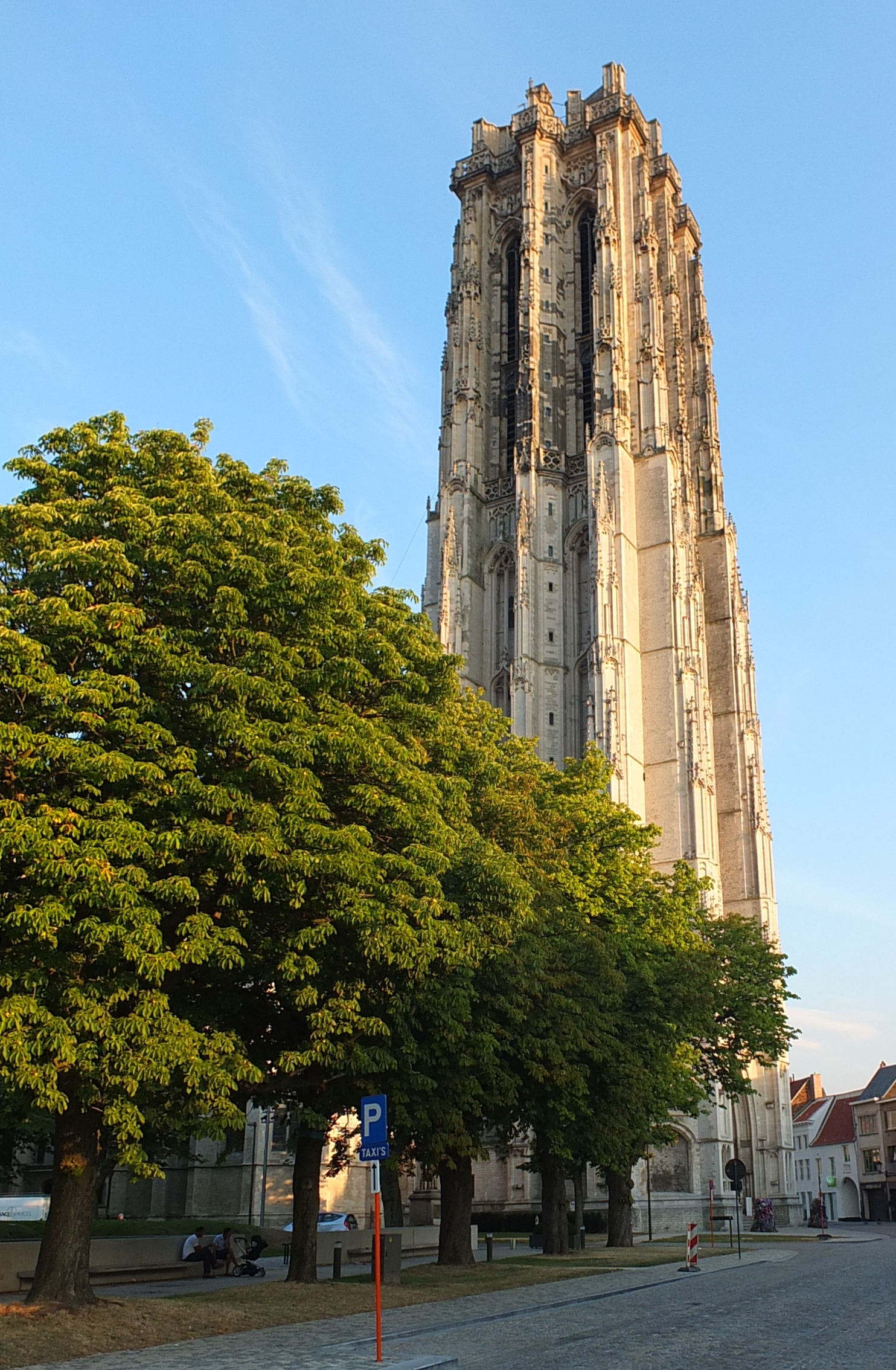
The tower of St. Rumbold's Cathedral in Mechelen, Belgium, where Jef Denyn generated worldwide interest in the carillon

With his improving skills as a carillonneur and the upgraded cathedral carillon, Denyn's performances began attracting crowds of listeners. He established regular Monday-night concerts at the suggestion of the city council. On 1 August 1892, Denyn hosted the first carillon concert in history. From this point forward, the instrument garnered a reputation as a concert instrument, rather than as an instrument tasked with providing background music.

=== Impact of the World Wars ===
Because of his concerts, Denyn met William Gorham Rice, an American state and federal government official from Albany, New York, US. Having traveled to The Hague and been exposed to the carillon, Rice was regularly touring the region to interview carillonneurs for his research. After Denyn's 18 August 1913 evening concert, he and Rice exchanged ideas about the societal and educational value of carillon performances for large audiences. Rice's book Carillons of Belgium and Holland, the first in the English language written specifically about carillons, was published in December 1914 and reprinted three times. The book painted an idealized picture of the region that resonated with the American public, particularly in light of the rape of Belgium. Its success motivated Rice to publish two more books in 1915 and 1925. Rice became an authority on carillons in the United States; besides his books, he gave 35 lectures in several cities, published articles in magazines, spoke on radio programs, and presented exhibition material on the subject between 1912 and 1922. In 1922, Rice garnered financial support from Herbert Hoover and John D. Rockefeller Jr. to establish a carillon school in Mechelen, with Denyn as its first director. It was later named the Royal Carillon School "Jef Denyn".

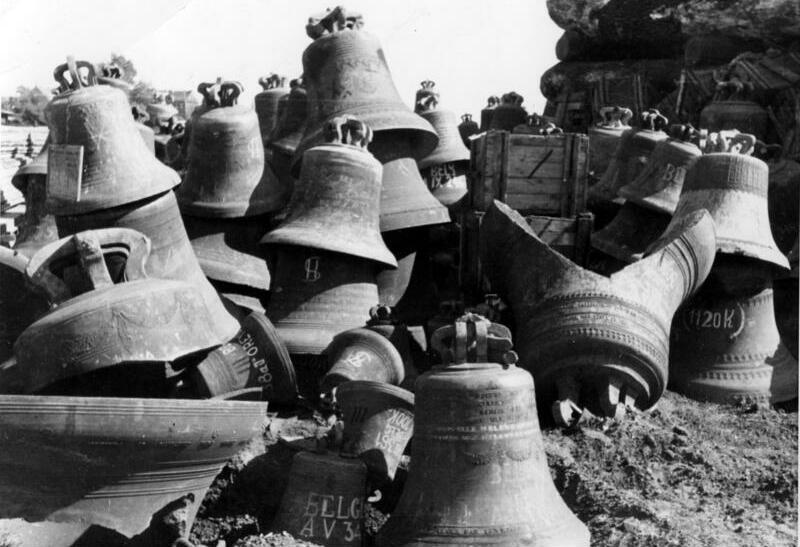
Broken bells in a "bell cemetery" in Hamburg, Germany, 1947

Stephen Thorne of the Canadian military history magazine Legion writes that the Allied Powers of World War I and of World War II saw the destruction of carillons during the respective wars as a "brutal annihilation of a unique democratic music instrument". The destruction was highly publicized among the allies of Belgium and the Netherlands. In the latter war, British investigators claimed Germany seized two-thirds of all bells in Belgium and every bell in the Netherlands. Between 1938 and 1945, 175,000 bells were stolen and stored in "bell cemeteries" (German: Glockenfriedhöfe). Some 150,000 were sent to foundries and melted down for their copper. Following the war, with the bells out of their towers, E. W. Van Heuven and other physicists could research the tonal qualities of bells in laboratory conditions and with modern electrical sound-analyzing equipment. Percival Price, the Dominion carillonneur at the Peace Tower, was tasked with repatriating as many surviving bells as possible. He also used the opportunity to publish similar research. Every bellfounder could then learn how to cast the highest-quality bells, and the increase in new carillons was greater than ever.

=== Movement in North America ===
Between 1922 and 1940, bellfounders installed 43 carillons in the United States and Canada. The flood of carillons onto the continent is attributed to Rice's widely popular books and persistent education in the United States. His romanticized depiction of the cultural instrument prompted wealthy donors to purchase carillons for their own civil and religious communities. Price was appointed to play the carillon at the Metropolitan United Church in Toronto, Ontario, Canada (before working as the Dominion carillonneur); Mary Mesquita Dahlmer was appointed to play at Our Lady of Good Voyage Church in Gloucester, Massachusetts, US. Both were the first professional carillonneurs in their respective countries. In 1936, The Guild of Carillonneurs in North America was founded at Parliament Hill in Ottawa, Ontario, Canada. Following the deaths of Denyn in 1941 and Rice in 1945, North American carillonneurs, through their new organization, sought to develop their own authority on education and performance. In the 1950s and 1960s, a distinct North American style of carillon music emerged at the University of Kansas. Ronald Barnes, the university's carillonneur, led in the style and encouraged his peers to compose for the carillon, and produced many of his own compositions.

=== International recognition ===
In the 1970s, the idea for a global carillon organization took shape, and the World Carillon Federation was later formed as the central organization of carillon players and enthusiasts. It is a federation of the pre-existing national or regional carillon associations that had been founded throughout the 20th century.

In 1999, UNESCO designated 32 bell towers in Belgium as a World Heritage Site, in recognition of their architectural diversity and significance. The list was expanded in 2005 to include 23 in France, as well as the tower of Gembloux, Belgium. In 2014, UNESCO recognized the carillon culture of Belgium as an intangible cultural heritage, stating that it "recognizes the creativity of carillonneurs and others who ensure that this cultural form remains relevant to today's local societies."

In 2008, the carillon was featured in the film Welcome to the Sticks, a box-office success as the highest-grossing French film ever released in France as of 2021.

In 2019, playing the carillon of St. Coleman's Cathedral in Cobh, Ireland, was recognized by the Irish government as key element of the country's living cultural heritage. In 2025, the casting of bells and playing music on bells was added to Germany's list of intangible cultural heritage.

== Usage and repertoire ==
=== Music ===
The carillon repertoire skews heavily toward newer works in stark contrast to that of its relative, the organ repertoire. Some 15 collections of carillon music written in the 17th and 18th centuries are known to exist. Like with the pipe organ, early carillon performances consisted mostly of improvisations. In the late Renaissance and early Baroque eras, keyboard music was not written for one instrument or another, but rather was written to be played on any keyboard instrument. For this reason, much of the carillon's repertoire in its early history was likely the same as that of the harpsichord, organ, and piano. One of the few surviving examples is the De Gruytters carillon book, dated 1746. The music is arranged, rather than composed, for performance on the carillon and could easily be played on other keyboard instruments. Baroque keyboard music is well suited for carillon transcription, particularly the works of Bach, Corelli, Couperin, Handel, Mozart, and Vivaldi.

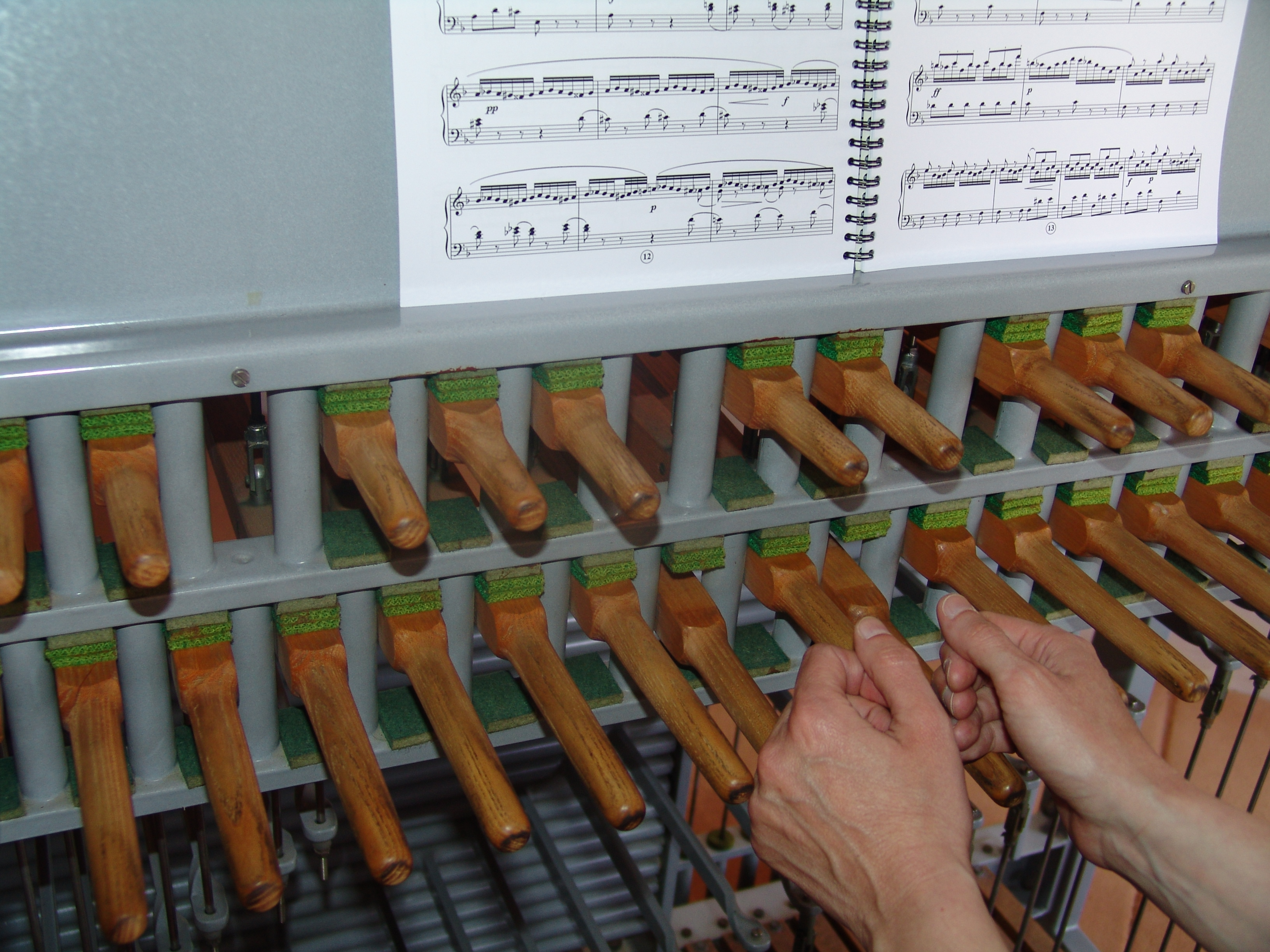
Carillon music is written on a grand staff. The treble clef signifies playing with hands and the bass clef playing with feet.

The earliest known original compositions specifically for the carillon, and not simply any keyboard, are the 11 preludes of Matthias Vanden Gheyn. The structure of his works suggests he had been playing nonspecific keyboard music on the carillon for many years and that he wanted to play music that is idiomatic to the instrument. Technically challenging, his preludes have been the standard repertoire among carillonneurs since the early 1900s.

Jef Denyn made many public statements about what music should be performed on the carillon, and he persuaded several composers of the time to write for it. Among those composers were his students, including Staf Nees, Léon Henry, and Jef Rottiers, and composers for other instruments, such as Jef van Hoof. The carillon school began publishing carillon music in 1925. Through his school, Denyn was the early proponent of the "Mechelen style" of carillon music, which consists of virtuosic flourishes, tremolos, and other Baroque and Romantic elements.

Ronald Barnes was the leading figure behind the North American style of carillon music, which developed in the 1950s and 1960s. He encouraged his University of Kansas peers to compose for the carillon, and he produced many of his own compositions. Barnes' campaign was most successful with Roy Hamlin Johnson, a piano professor who introduced a whole category of music exclusively native to the carillon featuring the octatonic scale. Many of Johnson's works are acknowledged as masterpieces. Barnes produced 56 original compositions and hundreds of arrangements to expand the available repertoire. Other major 20th-century contributors were Albert Gerken, Gary C. White, Johan Franco, John Pozdro, and Jean W. Miller. The new American style developed into the antithesis of the Mechelen style; instead of exciting, tremolo-filled performances that demonstrate the showmanship of the carillonneur, it features slow passages, sparse harmonies, and impressionist themes to draw the listener's attention to the natural sound of the bells.

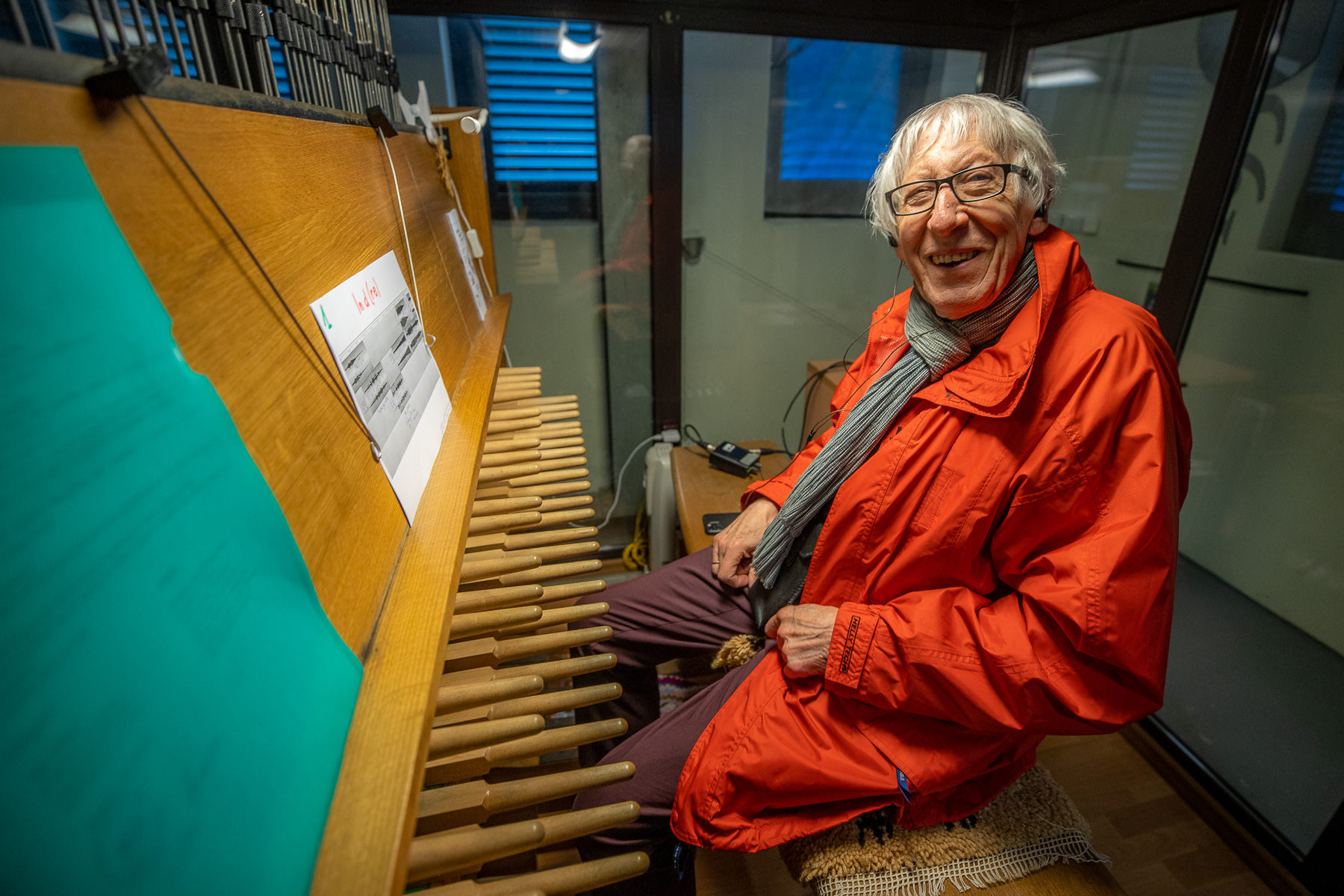
Carillonist near console of Kaunas Carillon, Lithuania

Carillon music was first published in North America in 1934. G. Schirmer, Inc. published the compositions of Curtis Institute of Music students Samuel Barber, Gian Carlo Menotti, and Nino Rota as part of the institute's short-lived publishing series. The Guild of Carillonneurs in North America opened the first dedicated publishing house for carillon music in North America in 1961. In 1968, the Anton Brees Carillon Library was established at Bok Tower Gardens in Lake Wales, Florida, US; it contains large collections of carillon music and related materials.

In the late 2010s, University of Michigan professor Tiffany Ng analyzed the diversity of the carillon repertoire. In a bibliography focusing on African-American music and composers, Ng claims, "while African-American music permeates the carillon repertoire," mostly in the form of spirituals, "almost none of the carillon arrangements and compositions are authored by African Americans." In a second bibliography with Emmet Lewis focusing on women, transgender, and non-binary composers, they assert that while many works have been written by these groups, they are often not published through traditional means, and "gender inequality remains systemic and common practice in carillon concerts."

=== Performances ===
A carillonneur plays Prelude No. 9 by Matthias Vanden Gheyn at St. Rumbold's Cathedral in Mechelen, Belgium

Performances on the carillon are commonly categorized as either recitals or concerts. Carillon recitals are traditional performances that take place on fixed schedules throughout the week. They may supplement regularly scheduled events, or take place at the convenience of the carillonneur. Traditional since the instrument's inception, this method is the foundation of carillon performance. Concerts refer to special carillon performances, typically featuring a program and a place for the audience to sit and listen. Some carillonneurs may livestream the event so the audience can watch them at the keyboard. The first carillon concert was held on 1 August 1892 as part of Jef Denyn's Monday-evening concert series.

The lack of consistent interest in traditional performances among the general public has caused carillonneurs to engage in musical collaborations and experiments, collectively referred to as "Carillon Plus". Carillonneur duos explore the possibility of duet playing and producing new music for the configuration. Others seek to play the carillon in orchestras, bands, and other ensembles. Carillon Plus performances are not new, but have been explored more intensely since the mid-20th century.

== Organization and education ==
The World Carillon Federation is the central organization of carillon players and enthusiasts. It is a federation of pre-existing regional, national, and supranational carillon organizations. As of 2025, it is composed of 15 member organizations:

- Carillon Association Luxembourg
- Carillon Society of Australia
- Carillon Society of Britain and Ireland
- Confraternity of Bell Ringers and Carillonists of Catalonia
- Flemish Carillon Association
- German Carillon Association
- Guild of Carillonneurs and Campanologists of Switzerland
- The Guild of Carillonneurs in North America
- Guild of Carillonneurs of France
- Lithuanian Carillonist Guild
- Nordic Society for Campanology and Carillons
- Polish Carillon Association
- Royal Dutch Carillon Association
- Russian Carillon Foundation
- Walloon Carillon Association

Every three years, the federation hosts an international congress in a home country of one of the member organizations. The congresses host lectures, workshops, and committee meetings about the topics related to the carillon, for example: news, tutorials and demonstrations, and research developments. Most member organizations give periodic updates to their members on the state of carillon culture in their respective regions.

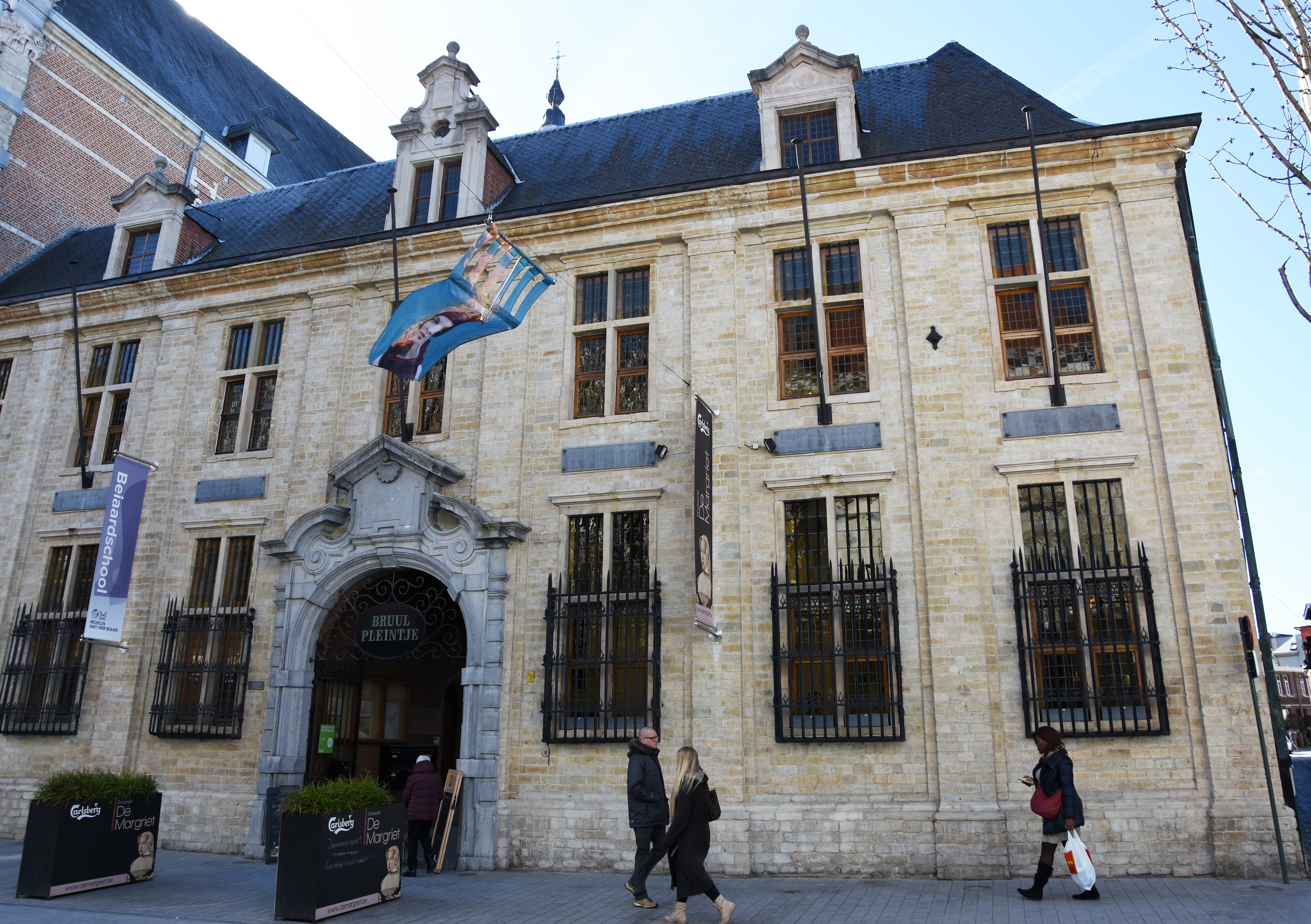
The Royal Carillon School "Jef Denyn" in 2018

Training to perform on a carillon can be obtained at several institutions, though the Royal Carillon School "Jef Denyn" has been the most popular. The LUCA School of Arts in Leuven, Belgium, offers a master's degree in the carillon, and the Utrecht School of the Arts in Amersfoort, Netherlands, has a dedicated school. The Scandinavian Carillon School is located in Denmark, and there are schools in the United Kingdom and France.

The Guild of Carillonneurs in North America organizes carillon examinations during its annual congresses. Those who pass are certified as carillonneur-members of the guild. It also partners with the North American Carillon School, founded in 2012 as an affiliate of the Royal Carillon School "Jef Denyn". Several American universities offer a carillon program within their curriculum. For example, the University of California, Berkeley; the University of California, Santa Barbara; the University of Denver; the University of Florida; and the University of Michigan offer complete courses of study. Clemson University, Indiana University, Iowa State University, the University of Kansas, and Marquette University offer limited credit for carillon performance. Employed carillonneurs will often offer private lessons at their carillons. Universities that possess a carillon but do not offer course credit often have a student organization or education program, such as the Yale University Guild of Carillonneurs, which manages performances on the Yale Memorial Carillon, and the University of Chicago Guild of Carillonists.

Music competitions for carillon are held regularly, with the international Queen Fabiola Competition being the most important.

== Distribution ==
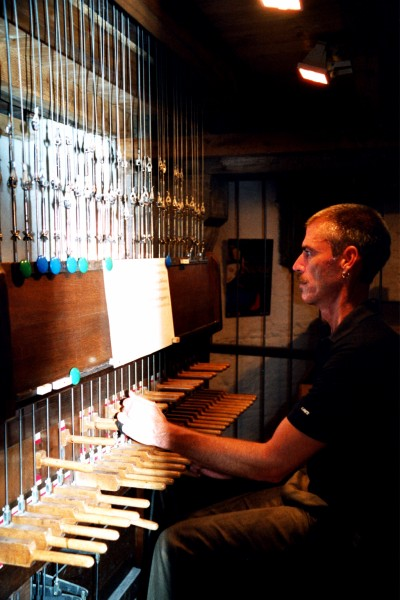
Carillonneur Brian Swager plays the traditional carillon at the Cathedral Saint-Jean-Baptiste (John the Baptist) in Perpignan, France.

Several institutions register and count carillons worldwide. Some registries specialize in counting specific types of carillons. For example, the War Memorial and Peace Carillons registry counts instruments that serve as war memorials or were built in the name of promoting world peace. TowerBells counts carillons played via a baton keyboard as "traditional carillons" and those with computerized or electronic mechanisms as "non-traditional carillons", among other bell instruments. It also publishes maps, technical specifications, and summary statistics. As the World Carillon Federation does not consider non-traditional carillons to be carillons, it counts only those which are played via a baton keyboard and without computerized or electronic mechanisms.

According to TowerBells and the World Carillon Federation, about 700 traditional carillons exist. At least three can be found on every continent except Antarctica; however, of the countries in which traditional carillons can be found, only six have more than 20. The "great carillon" countries—the Netherlands, Belgium, and the United States—account for two-thirds of the world total. Over 90% are in either Western Europe (mainly the Low Countries) or North America. In North America, about 80% of carillons are owned by religious or educational institutions, while in Europe, nearly all carillons are municipally owned. Almost all extant traditional carillons were constructed in the last 100 years; only some 50 historical carillons from the 18th century or earlier still exist. According to TowerBells, there are another 483 non-traditional carillons, which are located mainly in the United States and Western Europe.

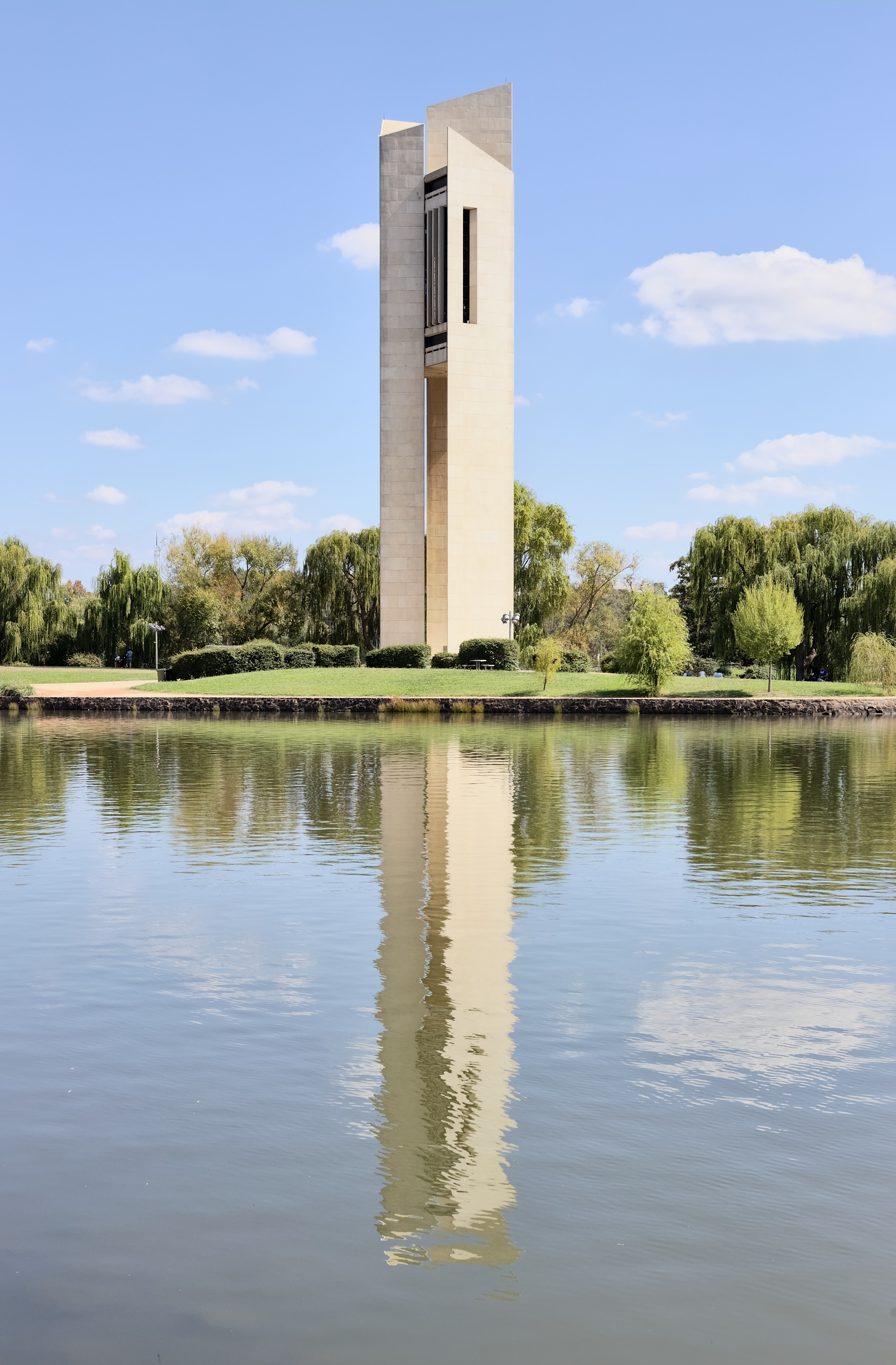
The National Carillon, a 57-bell carillon in Canberra, Australia

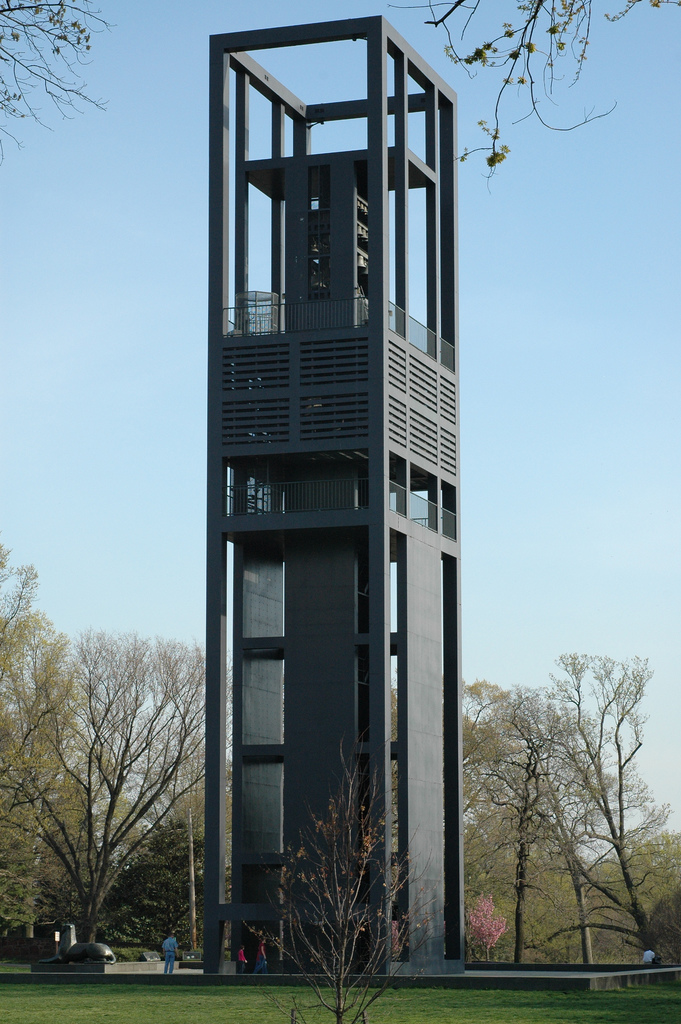
The Netherlands Carillon, a 53-bell carillon in Arlington County, Virginia, US

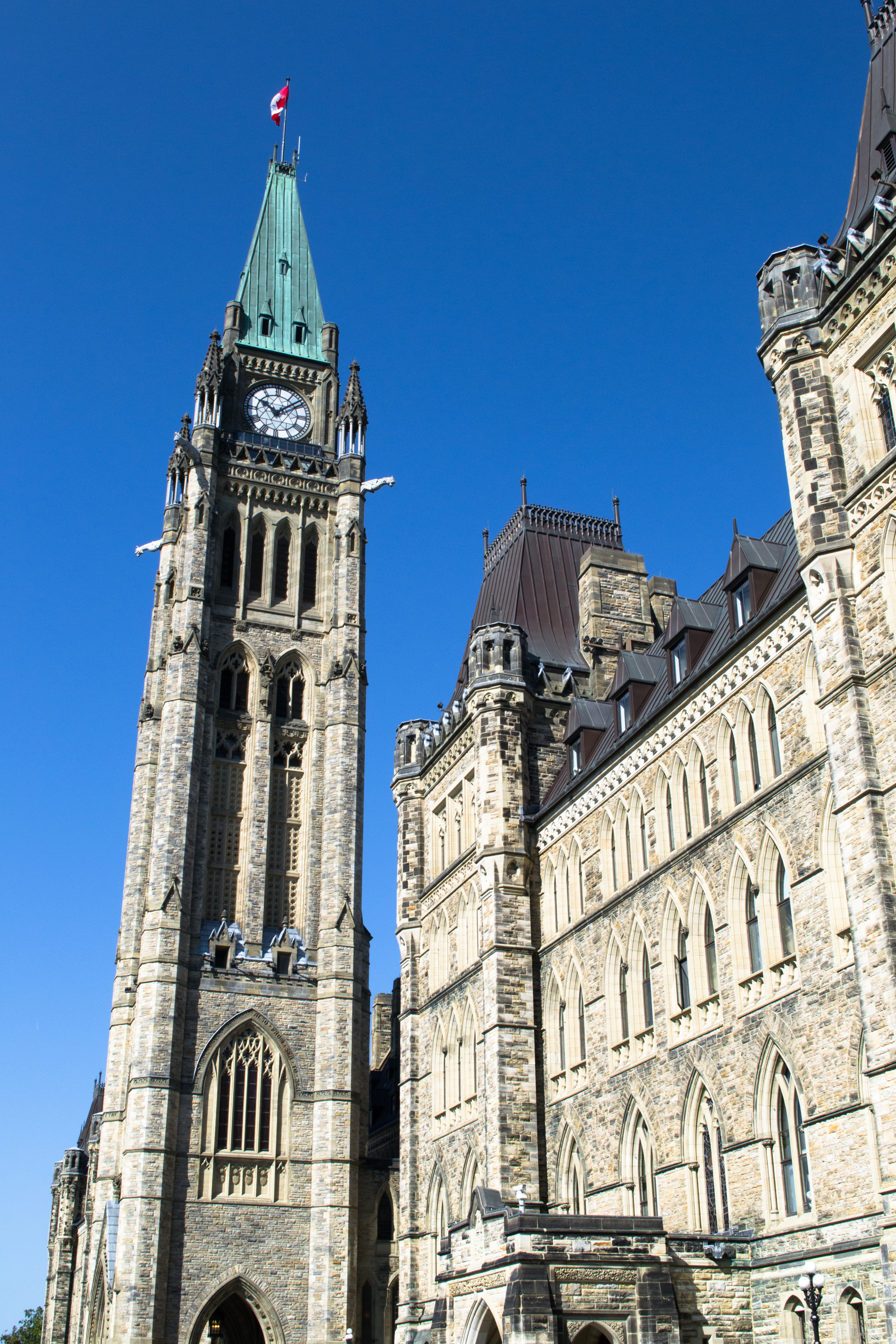
The Peace Tower in Ottawa, Ontario, Canada, home to a 53-bell carillon

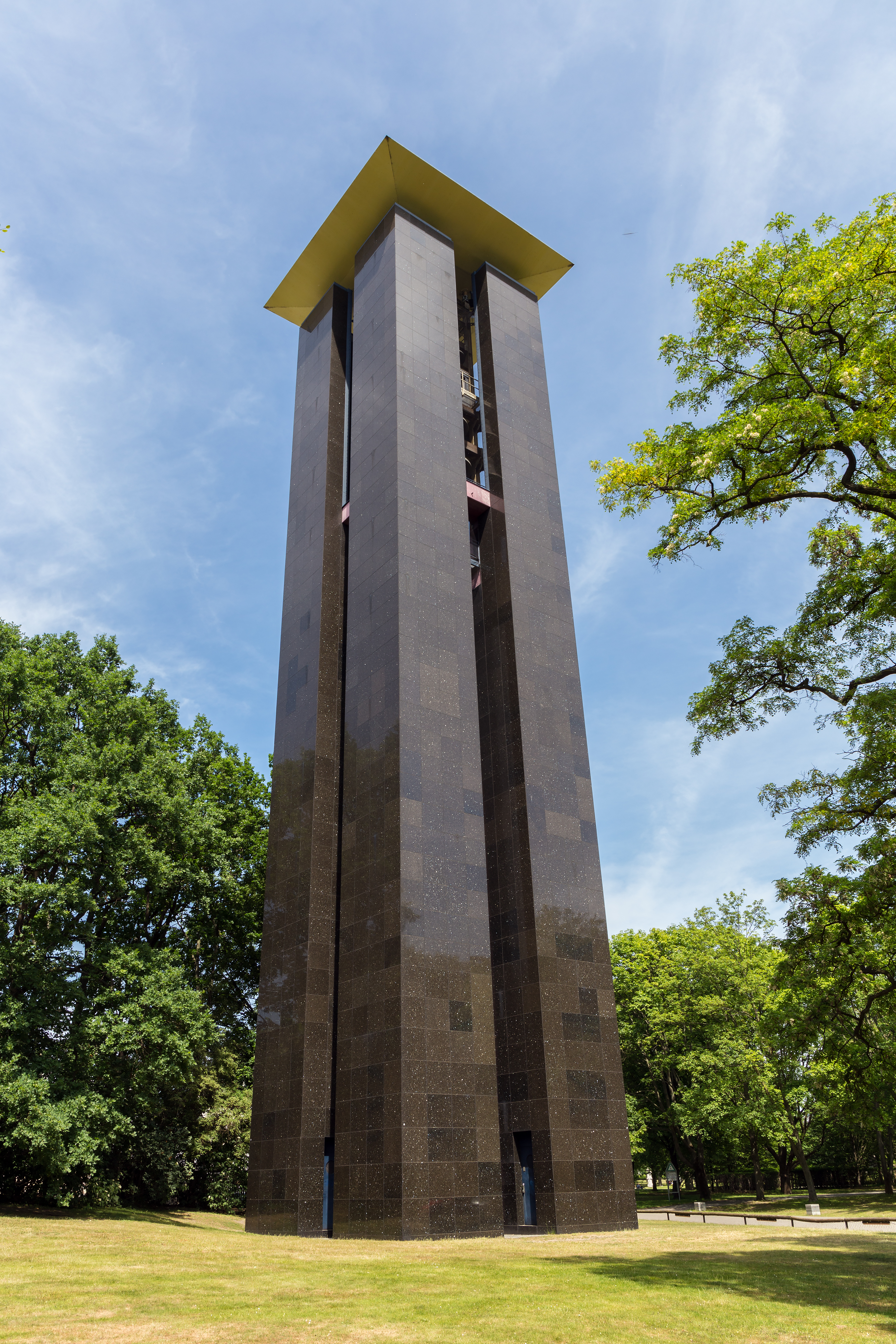
The Carillon in Berlin-Tiergarten, a 68-bell carillon in Berlin, Germany

List of carillons by country
Country	Traditional carillons		Non-traditional carillons per TB
Country	Per WCF	Per TB	Non-traditional carillons per TB
Algeria	0	0	1
Argentina	0	0	5
Australia (list)	3	3	3
Austria	2	2	5
Belgium (list)	93	97	24
Bermuda (UK)	0	1	0
Bosnia and Herzegovina	0	1	0
Brazil	2	3	1
Canada	11	11	7
Canary Islands (Spain)	0	0	1
Chile	0	0	1
China	0	1	1
Cuba	0	1	0
Curaçao (Netherlands) (Note: TowerBells still uses the former name Netherlands Antilles to tally instruments in this country.)	1	1	3
Czech Republic	0	2	1
DR Congo (Note: TowerBells still uses the former name Zaire to tally instruments in this country.)	0	0	1
Denmark	28	29	20
Dominican Republic	0	0	1
Egypt	0	1	1
El Salvador	0	1	0
England (UK; list)	8	9	8
Estonia	0	0	1
Finland	0	0	1
France	72	61	19
Germany (list)	48	48	113
Greece	0	0	1
Greenland (Denmark)	0	0	1
Guatemala	0	0	1
Honduras	0	1	0
Hong Kong (China)	0	0	1
Hungary	0	0	2
Iceland	0	0	1
Ireland (list)	1	1	0
Israel	1	1	0
Italy	0	0	4
Japan	3	3	5
Liberia	0	0	1
Lithuania	3	2	0
Luxembourg	1	1	1
Mexico	3	2	7
Mozambique	0	0	1
Netherlands	184	191	63
New Zealand (list)	1	1	1
Nicaragua	0	1	0
Northern Ireland (UK; list)	1	1	0
Norway	12	11	2
Peru	0	0	2
Philippines	1	1	2
Poland	2	3	0
Portugal	3	6	2
Puerto Rico (US)	0	0	2
Réunion (France)	1	1	0
Russia	2	3	4
Scotland (UK; list)	5	5	1
Serbia	0	0	1
Singapore	0	0	1
South Africa	1	3	3
South Korea	1	1	3
Spain	4	5	1
Suriname	0	1	0
Sweden	14	15	13
Switzerland	5	6	7
Ukraine	1	6	1
United States (list)	171	175	145
Uruguay	0	1	1
Venezuela	0	1	0
Zimbabwe	0	0	1
World	689	721	500

== Traveling carillons ==
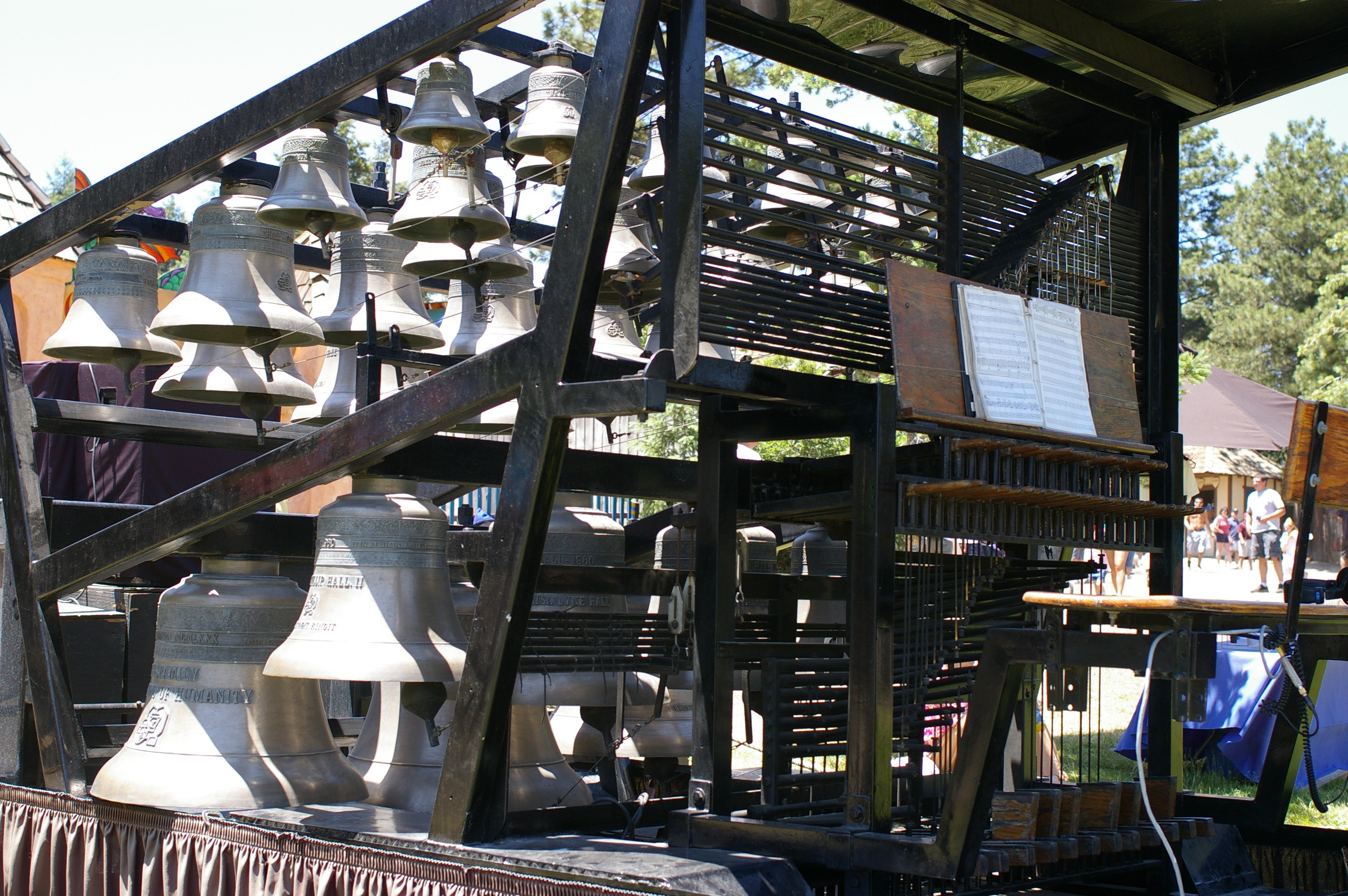
One of the Cast in Bronze traveling carillons at the Colorado Renaissance Festival in June 2008

Traveling or mobile carillons are those which are not housed in a tower. Instead, the bells and playing console are installed on a frame that allows it to be transported. These carillons have to be much lighter than their non-mobile counterparts. Nora Johnston conceived the idea of a traveling carillon between 1933 and 1938. She connected a traditional baton keyboard to a system of chime bars and fixed the structure to a portable frame. Johnston traveled twice to the United States to perform in radio documentaries, orchestral concerts, and commercials. Subsequent constructions by others used actual carillon bells.

According to counts by the World Carillon Federation and TowerBells, there are about 20 existing traveling carillons with only three being non-traditional. Many were or are owned by bell foundries as a promotional tool. Almost all traveling carillons are headquartered in Western Europe and the United States. Two American traveling carillons are part of the musical group Cast in Bronze, which features the "Spirit of the Bells" playing the carillon in concert with other instruments or a recording. Cast in Bronze is credited with introducing the carillon to the United States' public in its mission to promote and preserve the instrument.

== See also ==
- Bianzhong, an Eastern instrument having clapperless bells that are struck with hammers
- Canpanò – Italian bell ringing
- Electronic carillon
- Full circle ringing
  - Bolognese bell ringing
  - Change ringing
  - Veronese bell ringing
- Russian Orthodox bell ringing

== Bibliography ==
=== Books ===
- Chesman, Jeremy (2015). Making Music on the Carillon. American Carillon Music Editions. OCLC 917521619.
- Del Mar, Norman (1983). Anatomy of the Orchestra (2nd ed.). University of California Press. ISBN 0-520-04500-9. OCLC 10561390.
- Gouwens, John (2013). Campanology: A Study of Bells, with an Emphasis on the Carillon. North American Carillon School. ISBN 978-1-4840-3766-9.
- Gouwens, John (2017). Playing the Carillon: An Introductory Method (5th ed.). The Guild of Carillonneurs in North America. OCLC 765849175.
- Johnston, Ronald J. (1986). Bell-ringing: The English Art of Change-ringing. Viking Press. ISBN 978-0-670-80176-3. OL 2328271M.
- Keldermans, Karel; Keldermans, Linda (1996). Carillon: The Evolution of a Concert Instrument in North America. Springfield Park District. ISBN 0-9652252-0-8. OL 1024319M.
- Lehr, André (2005). Campanology Textbook: The Musical and Technical Aspect of Swinging Bells and Carillons (in Dutch). Translated by Schafer, Kimberly. The Guild of Carillonneurs in North America. OCLC 154672090. Archived from the original on 10 February 2021.
- Price, Percival (1983). Bells and Man. Oxford University Press. ISBN 978-0-19-318103-8.
- Rice, William Gorham (1914). Carillons of Belgium and Holland: Tower Music in the Low Countries. John Lane Company. hdl:2027/uc2.ark:/13960/t5p84727t.
- Rombouts, Luc. Article 'Carillon', The New Grove Dictionary of Music and Musicians, Second Edition, Oxford University Press, Oxford, 2000, part 5, pp. 128–134.
- Rombouts, Luc (2014). Singing Bronze: A History of Carillon Music. Translated by Communicationwise. Leuven University Press. ISBN 978-90-5867-956-7. Archived from the original on 17 June 2016.
- Swager, Brian (1993). A History of the Carillon: Its Origins, Development, and Evolution as a Musical Instrument (PDF) (DMus). Indiana University. OCLC 53120808. Archived (PDF) from the original on 25 July 2021.

=== Magazines and journals ===
- Barnes, Ronald (1987). "The North American Carillon Movement" (PDF). The Bulletin. 36 (1). The Guild of Carillonneurs in North America: 20–37. OCLC 998832003. Archived from the original on 10 February 2021.
- Barnes, Ronald (2014). "Carillonist, not Carillonneur" (PDF). The Bulletin. 63 (1). The Guild of Carillonneurs in North America: 41–42. OCLC 998832003. Archived from the original on 10 February 2021.
- Brink, Joey (19 December 2017). "Composing for Carillon". NewMusicBox. Archived from the original on 2 April 2021.
- De Turk, William (1999). "Barber, Menotti, Rota: Carillon Composers in Residence" (PDF). The Bulletin. 48 (1). The Guild of Carillonneurs in North America: 53–65. OCLC 998832003. Archived from the original on 10 February 2021.
- Halsted, Margo (November 2012). "What's in a Name?" (PDF). Carillon News. No. 88. The Guild of Carillonneurs in North America. p. 10. OCLC 1120054332. Archived (PDF) from the original on 24 May 2020.
- Slater, James B. (2003). "A Register of Honorary Members, 1936–1996" (PDF). The Bulletin. 52 (1). The Guild of Carillonneurs in North America. OCLC 998832003. Archived from the original on 10 February 2021.
- Thorne, Stephen J. (21 November 2018). "The Seizing of Europe's Bells". Legion. OCLC 1120054332. Archived from the original on 26 January 2021.
- Van Ulft, Carlo (2020). "Carillon Music: An Evolution" (PDF). The Bulletin. 69 (1). The Guild of Carillonneurs in North America: 32–36. OCLC 998832003. Archived from the original on 10 February 2021.
- Widmann, John (2014). "World Carillon Federation: Mobile Carillons" (PDF). The Bulletin. 63 (2). The Guild of Carillonneurs in North America: 12–19. OCLC 998832003. Archived from the original on 10 February 2021.

=== Internet ===
- "Carillon". Encyclopaedia Britannica. Archived from the original on 10 February 2021.
- "Carillon". Merriam-Webster Online. Archived from the original on 13 March 2021.
- "Carillon". Oxford English Dictionary (online ed.). Oxford University Press. (Subscription or participating institution membership required.)
- "Carillonneur". Merriam-Webster Online. Archived from the original on 13 August 2020.
- Courter, John; Hurd, Timothy; Janssens, Liesbeth; Macoska, Patrick; Oldenbeuving, Gert; van Wely, Bob (2006). Consensus on technical norms for a world standard carillon keyboard WCF Keyboard 2006 (PDF) (Report). World Carillon Federation. Archived (PDF) from the original on 17 November 2016.
- "Indexes to Non-traditional Carillons Around the World". TowerBells.org. Archived from the original on 5 May 2021.
- "Indexes to Traditional Carillons Around the World". TowerBells.org. Archived from the original on 31 May 2022.
- "Learn to Play". The Guild of Carillonneurs in North America. Archived from the original on 23 January 2021.
- Ng, Tiffany (3 February 2021) [First published 26 November 2018]. Annotated Bibliography of African American Carillon Music (PDF) (Report). University of Michigan Library. hdl:2027.42/146525. Archived (PDF) from the original on 22 July 2021 – via DeepBlue.
- Ng, Tiffany; Lewis, Emmet (30 April 2020). International Bibliography of Carillon Music by Women, Transgender, and Nonbinary Composers (PDF) (Report). University of Michigan Library. hdl:2027.42/153530. Archived (PDF) from the original on 13 June 2021 – via DeepBlue.
- "Organization". World Carillon Federation. Archived from the original on 7 November 2022.
