= Canpanò =

Italian tradition of bell ringing

The canpanò is a method of chiming bells employed in the North-east area of Italy.

There are many ways of playing canpanò according to the tradition of the locality, the bell tower's design and the number of bells that are used. The tradition was to play at midday, but today the bell player usually works in a factory, so plays at evening.

In general, there are not any limits about the number of bells which may be played.

== Playing "a cop" ==
Usually ist called "a cop", which is the canpanò played with an only bell. In this case the player uses the left-hand to play with the clapper, and with the right hand, they knock onto the external surface with a stone. In the region where it was played a cop the tradition is played for the 7 or 14 days before the date of the patron saint of the Catholic Church. This kind of ringing is used only in the bell tower that had no more than one bell.

== Playing "a canpanò" or "a batarela" ==
Playing a canpanò or batarela is a method using three or four bells. In this case, the player ties the bells, so they cannot move. Then the player connects by a rope each clapper to a fixed support, putting it in traction sufficiently to holding the clapper at 1–2 cm near the bells internal surfaces. Now, pulling with the hands on the ropes, they can play the belts. Usually, they use their right-hand to play the small and the big bells, and their left-hand to playing the medium ones. If the bells are placed on more levels, they will play one of these with a foot or they call another player to help them. This kind of canpanò is used in the region where is played a cop. Usually, people ring for seven days before the day of the patron saint.

== Playing "a canpanon" ==
The a canpanon is the equivalent of the batarela for the churches of the north of the province of Belluno. A lot of players play four or five bells, and everyone does not play more than one or two. Usually, the bells are very big and require the large part of the bell tower's space, so the players must stay in dangerous places. The bells are not tied and are played feeding the clappers by the hands. The canpanon is played the day before the patron saint's day, Christmas and Easter.

== Other similar playing methods ==
Near the Lake Garda the style of playing canpanò is similar to the batarela style, but the ropes tied at the clappers are not parallel, and the action that the player make on these to playing is not vertical but axial. In the Po valley, a large number of bells are played by an equal number of players according to a prefixed sequence. The bells are fed directly by ropes from the base of the bell tower.

== Sequence ==
The sequences of passages are different in each church. In a lot of areas, the tradition will that the players play a fix composition written on a paper or teach through the generations. This operation is necessary when there are more players. In other places (usually, where is ring a batarela or a cop) there are many symphonies that the player juxtaposes according their pleasure. In this case, the compositions may be copied from a place to another, but they appear ever different because the characteristics of the bell tower changes.

=== Campanology ===
The study of bells which includes how the bells are made is called Campanology.

== See also ==
- Carillon
