= Andrew E. Rice =

American political scientist (1922–2010)

Andrew Eliot Rice
- Born: 29 August 1922; Boston, Massachusetts, U.S.
- Died: 1 June 2010 (aged 87); Cabin John, Maryland, U.S.
- Known for: Founder of the Society for International Development (Peace Corps forerunner)
- Relatives: William Gorham Rice, grandfather

Academic background
- Education: Harvard University; Syracuse University

Academic work
- Discipline: International Development
- Institutions: Colorado State University; American University

Andrew Eliot Rice (29 August 1922 – 1 June 2010) was an American academic and expert on international development. He founded the Society for International Development in 1957, and at Colorado State University he undertook research leading to the formation of the Peace Corps immediately prior to the John F. Kennedy administration. Later in life he was a lecturer at American University.

== Biography ==
Andrew Eliot Rice was born 29 August 1922 in Boston, Massachusetts, to William Gorham Rice, Jr. (1891–1964) and Rosamond (Eliot) Rice, the daughter of Samuel Atkins Eliot II, and granddaughter of Charles William Eliot of the Eliot family. His father was a law professor at the University of Wisconsin–Madison, and his grandfather, William Gorham Rice, Sr. was active in civil service reform. Rice was a direct patrilineal descendant of Edmund Rice, an early English immigrant to the Massachusetts Bay Colony. (Note: The descendancy of Andrew Eliot Rice from Edmund Rice is as follows: Edmund Rice (1594–1663); Benjamin Rice (1640–1713); Ebenezer Rice (1671–1724); Ebenezer Rice (1709–1793); Joseph Rice (1744–1826); William Rice (1778–?); William A. Rice (1820–1906); William Gorham Rice, Sr. (1856–1945); William Gorham Rice, Jr. (1892–1979); Andrew Eliot Rice (1922–2010).) After attending public schools in Madison, Wisconsin, Rice attended Harvard University, graduating with an S.B. degree in government in 1943. He served in U.S. Army Intelligence from 1943 to 1945 Rice earned an M.A. degree in Political Science at Harvard in 1948 and his doctoral degree in International Development at Syracuse University in 1963. Rice was married to his first wife, Margaret (Peggy) Goodwin, in Brookville, IN in 1954, and they had two children prior to their divorce. Rice remarried in 1972 to artist Constance Marie Bergfors of Quincy, Massachusetts, and they had two children together.

Beginning in the early 1950s, Rice began his career in international development working for the United States federal government. In 1955, he served as president and chairman of the International Development Conference, a cooperative of U.S. non-governmental organizations that led to the founding of the Society for International Development (SID). As one of the SID founders in 1957, he served as the first Executive Secretary of the organization. While working with Maurice L. Albertson at Colorado State University in January 1961, Rice co-authored the study used by U.S. President John F. Kennedy as a blueprint for the formation of the U.S. Peace Corps. In the 1970s, Rice was a member and chairman of the board of directors of the Worldwatch Institute, an environmental research center. He also served as president of the United Nations Association of the National Capital Area. During the 1990s he was an adjunct professor at American University's School of International Service. After retirement from the Society for International Development, he wrote a historical column for the Cabin John Village News. He was also a cellist with the Symphony of the Potomac since the early 1970s.

Rice died 1 June 2010 at his home in Cabin John, Maryland.

== Selected publications ==
- Albertson, Maurice L., Pauline E. Birky, and Andrew E. Rice. 1961. The Peace Corps Final Report. Colorado State University Research Foundation, Fort Collins. January, 1961.
- Rice, Andrew Eliot. 1963. Building a Constituency for the Foreign Aid Program: The Record of the Eisenhower Years. Syracuse University, Ph.D. Dissertation.
- Rice, Andrew E. 1982. The First Quarter-Century of the Society for International Development: A Personal Reflection. In Society for International Development, 25th Anniversary World Conference: The Emerging Global Village, Baltimore, MD, USA.
- Rice, Andrew E., and Cyril Ritchie. 1995. Relationships between International Non-governmental Organizations and the United Nations. Union of International Associations, Washington, D.C.
- Alloo, Fatma, Peggy Antrobus, Robert J. Berg, Louis Emmerij, Arturo Escobar, Gustavo Esteva, Jessica Horn, Joanna Kerr, Smitu Kothari, Afaf Mahfouz, Stephen F. Moseley, Khawar Mumtaz, Juma Mwapachu, Duncan Okello, Shobha Raghuram, Andrew E. Rice, Wolfgang Sachs, Nafis Sadik, and Jos Van Gennip. 2007. Reflections on 50 Years of Development. Development 50:4–32.
