= Carillon in Berlin-Tiergarten =

Bell instrument in Berlin, Germany

Coordinates: 52°31′04″N 13°22′02″E

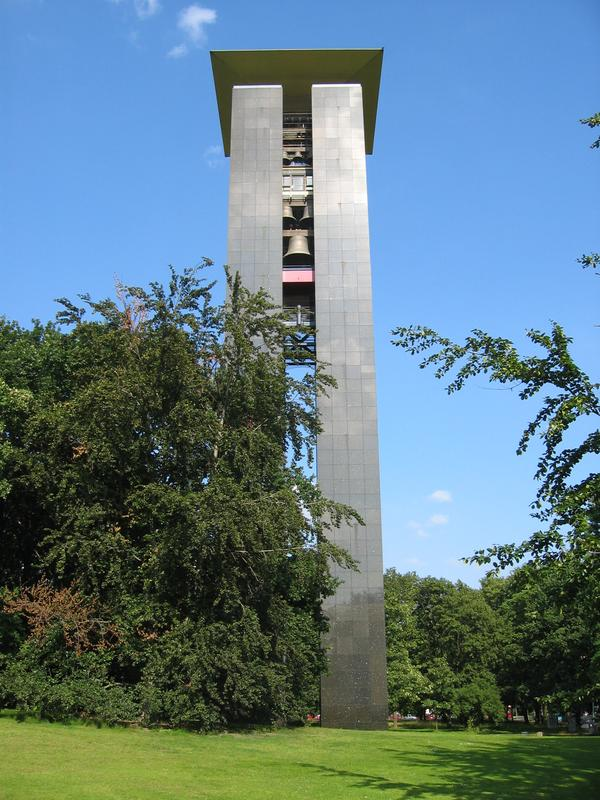

The Carillon in Berlin-Tiergarten is located in a freestanding 42-metre-tall (138 ft) bell tower next to the House of World Cultures (Haus der Kulturen der Welt), near the Chancellery in the northeastern part of Berlin's central Tiergarten park. It contains a large, manually played concert carillon, comprising 68 bells weighing a total of 48 tonnes (106,000 lb) connected to a keyboard spanning 5 and a half fully chromatic octaves; the largest bell weighs 7.8 tonnes (17,000 lb). The carillonneur sits in a playing cabin in the middle of the bells and plays with his fists and feet on a baton-and-pedal keyboard. The purely mechanical action makes it possible to play all dynamic gradations, from very soft to very loud.

The carillon was given to the city by Daimler-Benz AG under CEO Edzard Reuter in 1987 on the occasion of Berlin's 750th birthday. It was cast by Royal Dutch foundry Eijsbouts according to the specifications of carillonneur Jeffrey Bossin. It is one of the largest instruments of its kind in Europe and approximately the fourth largest (by number of bells) in the world.

Berlin carillonneur Jeffrey Bossin plays concerts on the carillon every Sunday at 3:00 p.m. from the beginning of May until the end of September and on the more important national holidays (2:00 p.m. in December); the programs include music written for the carillon and arrangements of classical works and popular songs. Tours of the carillon tower, including a unique view of Berlin and its government buildings, are offered at the end of the concerts. The carillonneur guides groups through the tower and (in English and German) answers questions, explains the special features of the instrument, and recounts the history of the carillon in Berlin from its beginnings under the first king of Prussia to the reunification of Germany. He demonstrates the instrument's playing technique and plays a carillon piece for his guests.

== See also ==
- List of carillons
