= The Guild of Carillonneurs in North America =

Professional association in North America

- Abbreviation: GCNA
- Formation: September 3, 1936; 90 years ago
- Founders: 31, including Percival Price
- Founded at: Parliament Hill, Ottawa, Canada
- Type: Professional association
- Registration no.: 94-3166127
- Legal status: 501(c)(3) organization
- Purpose: Advance the art, literature, and science of the carillon in North America
- Headquarters: Oakland, California, US (legal)
- Products: Sheet music; scholarly journal; newsletters
- Services: Annual congress; certification of musicianship; grant awards
- Members: 416 (2020)
- Website: www.gcna.org

The Guild of Carillonneurs in North America (GCNA) is a professional association of carillonneurs in North America, dedicated to the advancement of the art, literature, and science of the carillon. It was founded in Ottawa, Canada, in 1936 by American and Canadian carillonneurs so that they could keep better contact and develop the musicality of the instrument. It publishes sheet music, two periodicals, and instrument design standards; holds an annual congress for members to share ideas and developments; administers music examinations for its members; and offers grants for various activities concerning the carillon.

== Activities ==
=== Annual congress ===
The GCNA hosts an annual congress in which attendees can listen to recitals, attend workshops, participate in business meetings, and socialize. It has been hosted annually since 1946, with sporadic scheduling in the years before. The 2020 congress was canceled and the 2021 congress made virtual due to the COVID-19 pandemic. The gatherings have been historically important to the development of the organization and its members.

=== Publications ===
As an organization of musicians, the GCNA publishes sheet music, and has been doing so since 1961. It also commissions music for publication, the first of which was issued to Ronald Barnes in 1982.

The GCNA publishes two periodicals: a scholarly journal, The Bulletin, and a newsletter, Carillon News. The Bulletin is generally published each year. Members submit articles to be included in the publication. Typical content includes a report on the most recent congress, discussions on the carillon repertoire, histories of instruments, and biographies of carillonneurs, among other topics. Carillon News is published semiannually. Current and back issues are freely available to read for nonmembers.

One of the original purposes of the GCNA was to publish keyboard design standards, which it adopted first in 1970 and published in that year's November issue of The Bulletin. The standards were revised in 1981 and formally published in 2006. In addition to keyboard standards, the GCNA also published standards for carillon tower design in 2006.

The GCNA previously published a directory of carillons in North America. The last publication is dated 2014.

=== Performance examinations ===
The GCNA offers two levels of examinations to certify the ability to play the carillon—the Associate Carillonneur exam and the Carillonneur exam. The Associate Carillonneur exam evaluates carillonneurs at an intermediate difficulty, whereas the Carillonneur exam evaluates at an advanced difficulty. There is no exam for a beginner difficulty. This examination process stemmed from the lack of an existing music school in North America at the time of the Carillonneur exam's creation in 1947.

== History ==
On October 3 and 4, 1934, 11 carillonneurs and 20 family members and supporters gathered at Trinity College in Hartford, Connecticut, United States, at the invitation of Remsen Brinckerhoff Ogilby, president and carillonneur of the college. It was one of the first times that carillonneurs in North America could meet each other and exchange ideas. The GCNA refers to this meeting as the "First Congress of Carillonneurs in North America". Among the attendees was William Gorham Rice, a man who had for several years at that point worked to publicize the carillon throughout the United States. The attendees discussed a plan for a North American organization and subsequent meetings.

In 1936, Percival Price invited the "First Congress" attendees and others to Parliament Hill in Ottawa, Canada, from September 1 to 3 for a second congress. On the last day, the attendees formally established The Guild of Carillonneurs in North America. The more than 30 attendees set the purposes of the guild to be standardizing the instrument keyboard, providing advice on new carillons, fostering the composition of original music for carillon, and maintaining contacts between carillonneurs. It hosted subsequent congresses throughout the 1930s and 1940s.

To strengthen contact between carillonneurs, the GCNA published the first edition of its scholarly journal The Bulletin in 1940, though it initially appeared to be more of a newsletter. In 1946, at its congress at Princeton University, the GCNA formalized its definition of a carillon, which is codified into its articles of incorporation. Members were active in developing the organization, but many activities ceased until the end of World War II.

With its 1946 congress, the GCNA began hosting the gathering annually. They played an important role in strengthening the carillon in North America. Due to their isolation from each other, the congresses were necessary to keep contact and exchange ideas.

Due to the lack of an existing music school for carillon in North America, the GCNA created a student examination in 1947 to encourage some form of performance standards on the continent. It was notably not uniform in execution until the mid-1970s.

For the purpose of these Articles, a carillon is a musical instrument consisting of at least two octaves of carillon bells arranged in a chromatic series and played from a keyboard permitting control of expression through variation of touch. A carillon bell is a cast bronze cup-shaped bell whose partial tones are in such harmonious relationship to each other as to permit many such bells to be sounded together in varied chords with harmonious and concordant effect.

— Articles of incorporation of The Guild of Carillonneurs in North America

Beginning in 1954, Theophil Rusterholz, a carillonneur and lawyer in Minnesota, volunteered as the GCNA's legal advisor. He incorporated the GCNA in 1962 in Minnesota. The state of incorporation was later changed to California in 1992.

From 1961 to 1975, the GCNA's congresses showed that its members were increasingly improving the quality of carillon music. The GCNA began publishing music again in 1961. Following through with an original purpose of the organization, the GCNA approved a North American keyboard standard in 1966. At the formation of the World Carillon Federation in 1974, the GCNA immediately joined as a member organization and has been active in its activities since.

== Governance and finances ==
The GCNA is a small nonprofit organization with no paid staff and is run exclusively through volunteer work through the board and its committees. Though the organization calls itself a guild, it is not a labor union or other self-regulating body.

Its Employer Identification Number is 94–3166127. In 1993, the IRS ruled that it could operate as a 501(c)(3) organization. In the fiscal year ending on April 30, 2021, the GCNA reported US$37,314.91 in revenue (excluding unrealized capital gains). Of that, 49 percent represents membership fees, 33 percent interest and dividends, 16 percent music sales, and the remainder other sources. It reported $63,708.60 in expenses. Among other expenses, $16,399.70 was awarded as grants, $29,146.38 was spent on music and other publications, and $15,067.37 on administrative overhead. The GCNA has substantive wealth in its capital accounts, the sum of which equate to $952,064.06. In the annual report for the same year, the president commented that the GCNA "has a good problem" in that its net worth is growing by nearly $70,000 each year thanks to the capital accounts, and as a result it is not spending enough on educational endeavors.

== See also ==
- North American Guild of Change Ringers – a professional association focusing on a different form of bellringing
- Royal Carillon School "Jef Denyn" – a music school in Belgium which is historically important to the GCNA
