= List of carillons =

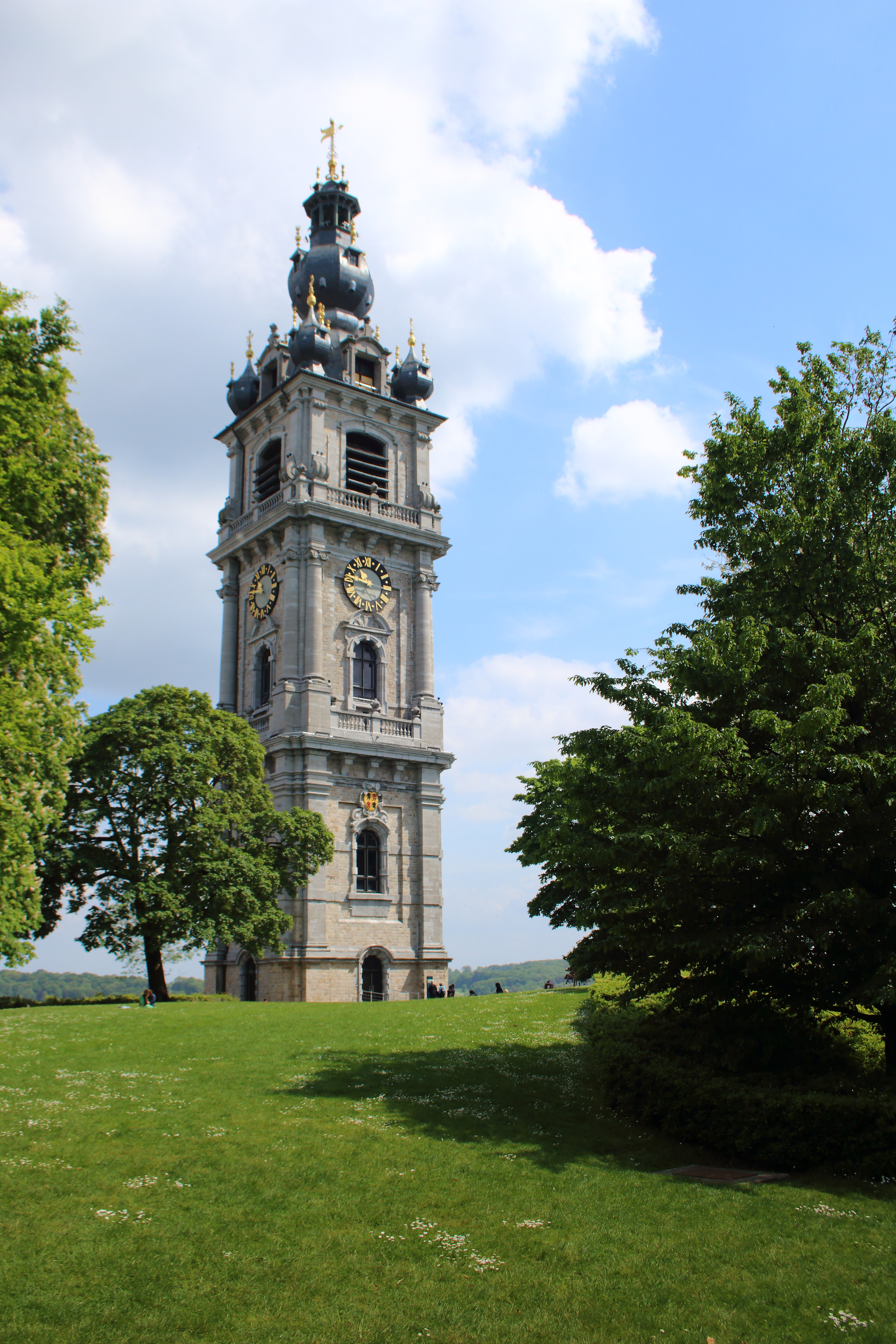
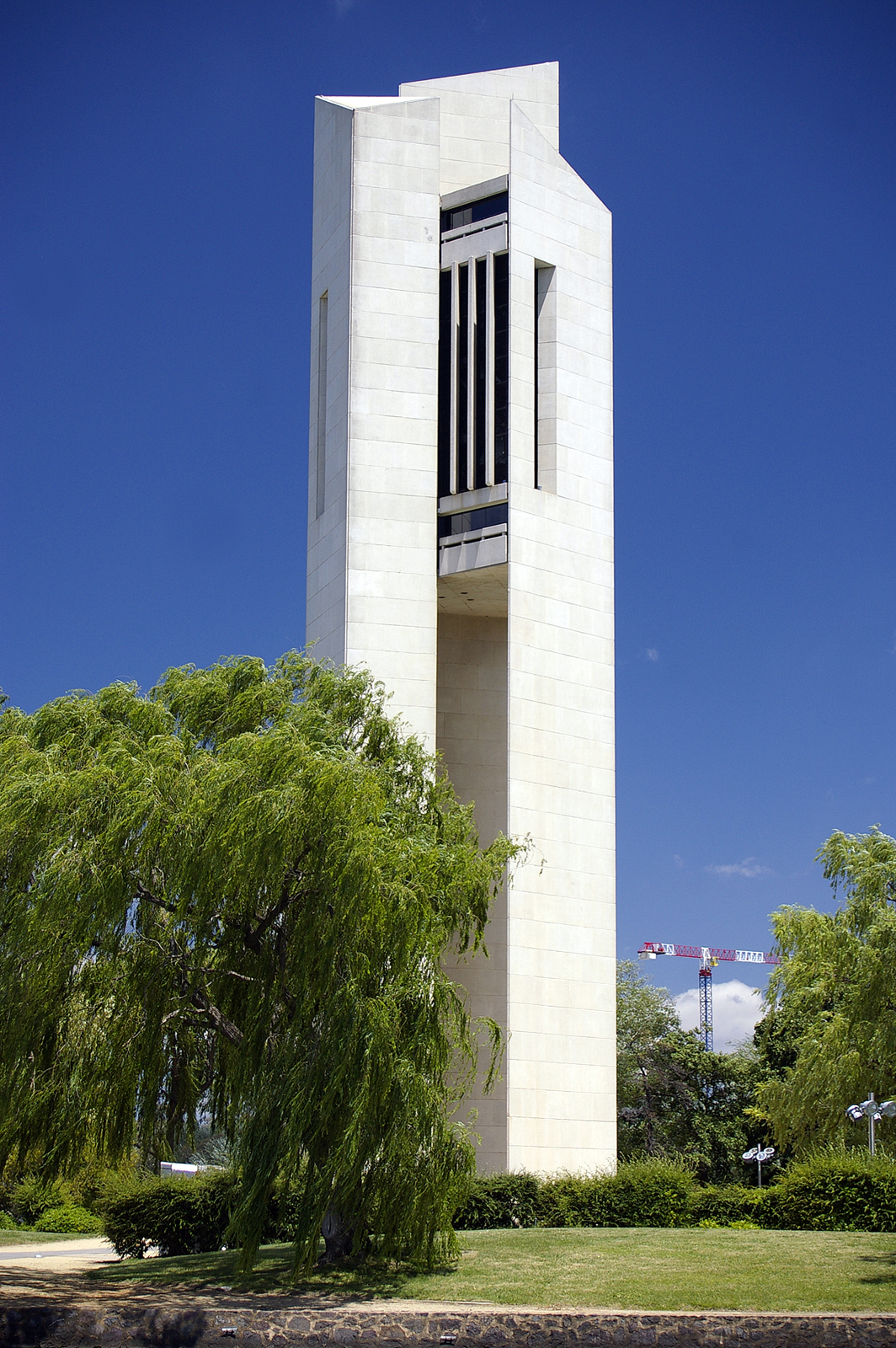
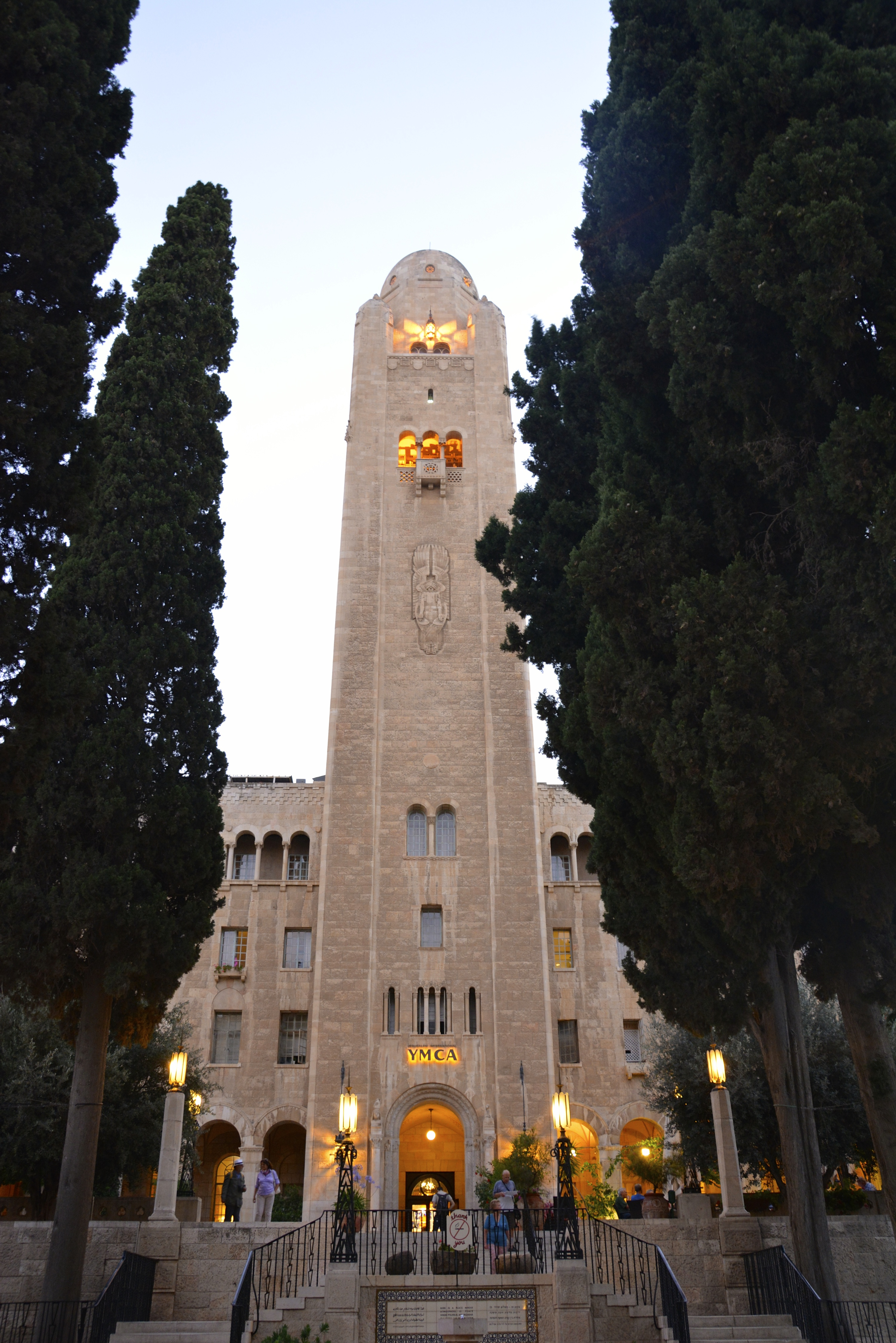
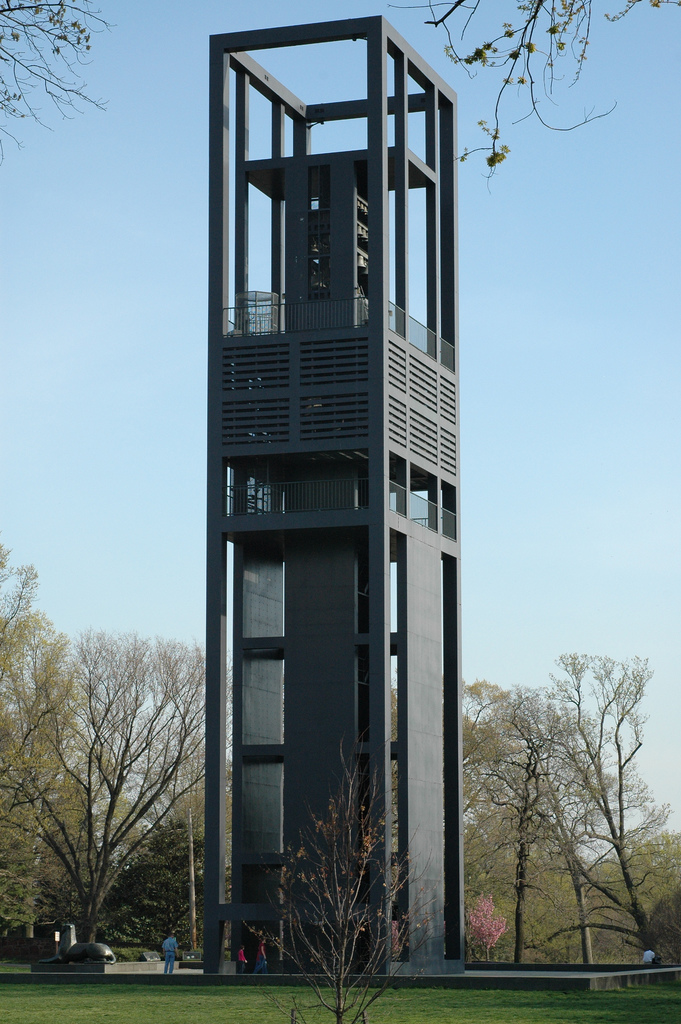
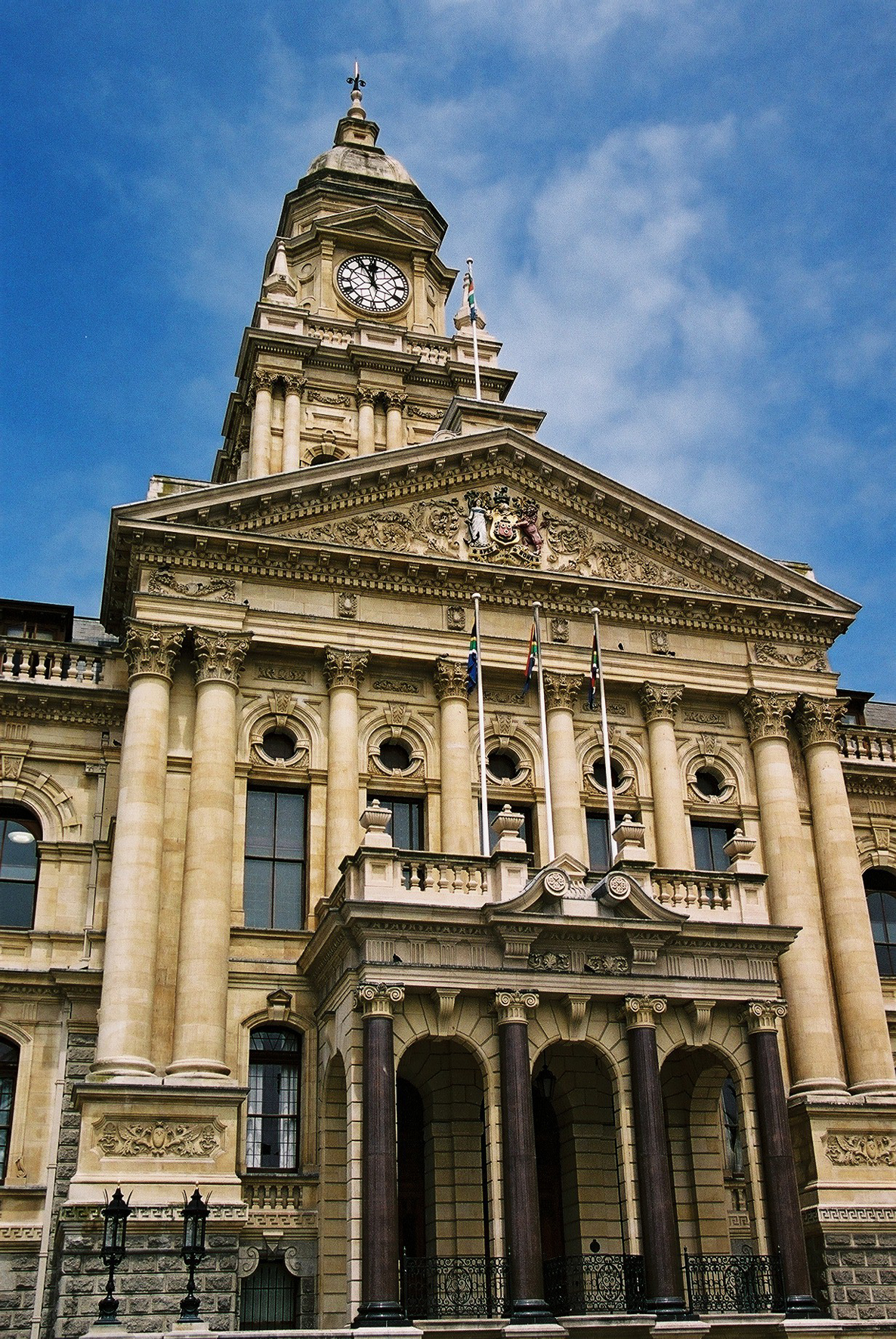
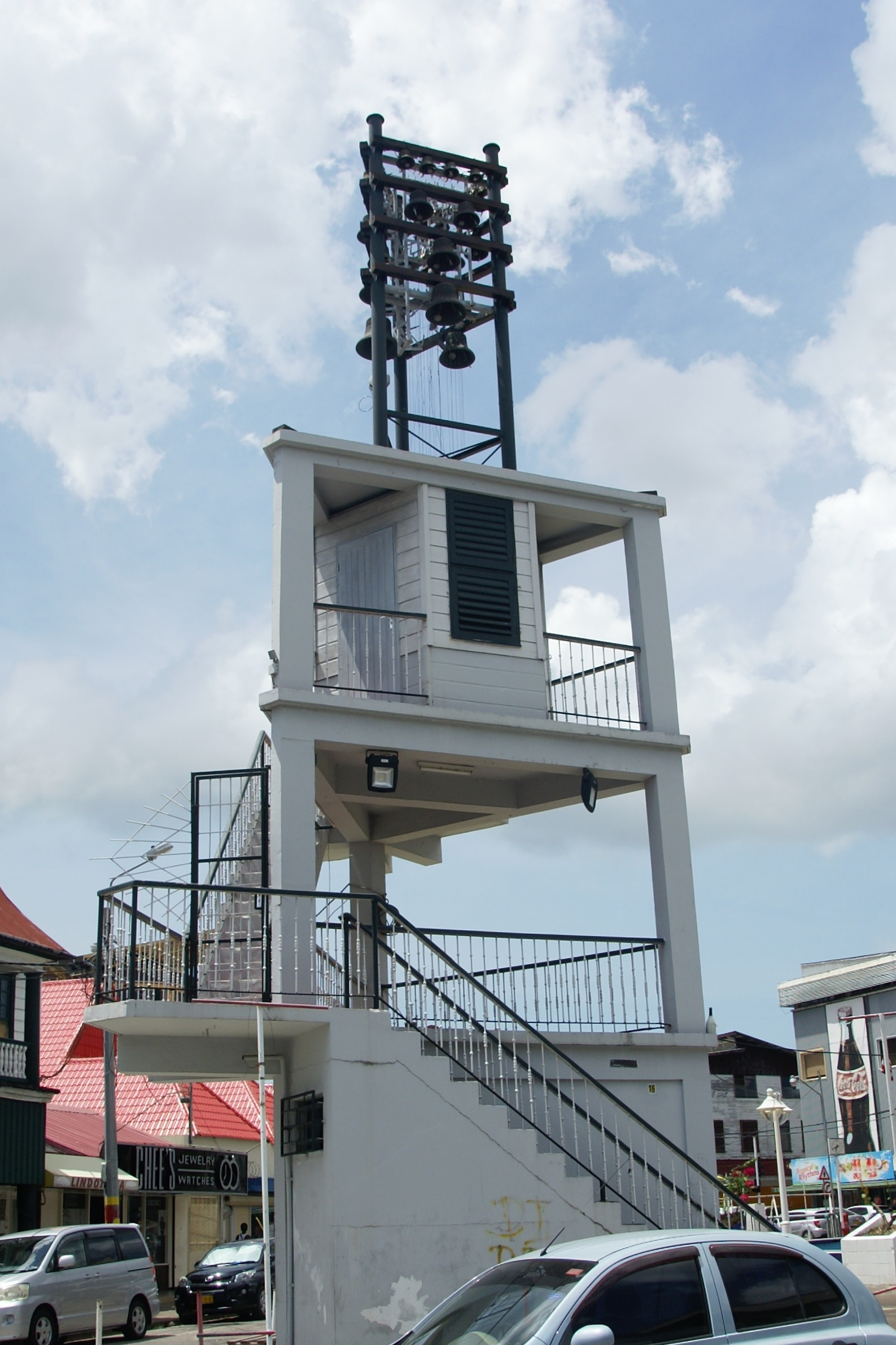
Carillons are found on all six inhabited continents. Clockwise from the top left: The Belfry of Mons, Belgium; the National Carillon in Canberra, Australia; the Netherlands Carillon in Arlington, Virginia, US; the carillon at Vaillantsplein in Paramaribo, Suriname; the City Hall of Cape Town, South Africa; and the International YMCA in Jerusalem, Israel.

Carillons, musical instruments of bells in the percussion family, are found on every inhabited continent. The Netherlands, Belgium, and the United States contain more than two thirds of the world's total, and over 90 percent can be found in either Western Europe (mainly the Low Countries) or North America.

== Criteria for inclusion ==
The World Carillon Federation (WCF) defines a carillon as an instrument of at least 23 cast bronze bells hung in fixed suspension, played with a traditional keyboard of batons, and tuned in chromatic order so that they can be sounded harmoniously together. It may designate instruments of 15 to 22 bells built before 1940 as "historical carillons". Its member organizations – including for example The Guild of Carillonneurs in North America, the German Carillon Association, and the Flemish Carillon Association – also define a carillon with those restrictions. Conversely, TowerBells.org – a database of tower bells of all types – defines a "non-traditional" carillon, which is an instrument that has had some component electrified or computerized. These instruments fail to meet the definitions of a carillon defined by the associations of carillonneurs mentioned above. This list contains only those carillons that meet the definition outlined by an association of carillonneurs, such as the WCF and its member organizations.

== Africa ==
=== Réunion ===
- Cilaos: Church of Our Lady of the Snows – 48 bells, 1996

=== South Africa ===
- Cape Town: City Hall – 40 bells, heaviest 2,409 kg (5,311 lb), John Taylor & Co at various dates between 1905 and 1953

== Asia ==
=== Israel ===
Israel has one carillon, located at the Jerusalem International YMCA. It was installed and dedicated along with the rest of the newly constructed building in 1933. Gillett & Johnston cast the original 35 bells, the heaviest of which weighs 1,500 kilograms (3,300 lb). In 2018, Royal Eijsbouts cast a 36th bell, weighing 800 kilograms (1,800 lb), for the instrument. It is one of the only carillons in the Middle East.

=== Japan ===
Japan has been exposed to carillons through its relations with Belgium. Since the 1980s, Belgium has used a targeted cultural diplomacy program to expose Japanese artists and students to the carillon, and to encourage them to construct instruments in their country. The city and province of Antwerp and the city of Mechelen provided Osaka with a mobile carillon in 1984. Hasselt donated a carillon to Itami, its sister city, in 1990. Members of the Shinji Shumeikai religious movement, inspired by their trip to St. Rumbold's Cathedral in Mechelen, purchased a carillon for Shigaraki in 1990. The Japanese School of Brussels and the Royal Carillon School "Jef Denyn" established educational relations on playing and composing for the carillon.

- Itami: The Bells of Flanders – 43 bells, heaviest 375 kg (827 lb), Royal Eijsbouts 1990
- Sasebo, Nagasaki: Carillon Symphonica in the 'Huis ten Bosch' – 37 bells
- Shigaraki: 'The Joy of Angels' at Misono, the international headquarters and spiritual centre of the Shinji Shumeikai organisation – 50 bells, heaviest unlisted, Royal Eijsbouts 1990

=== Philippines ===
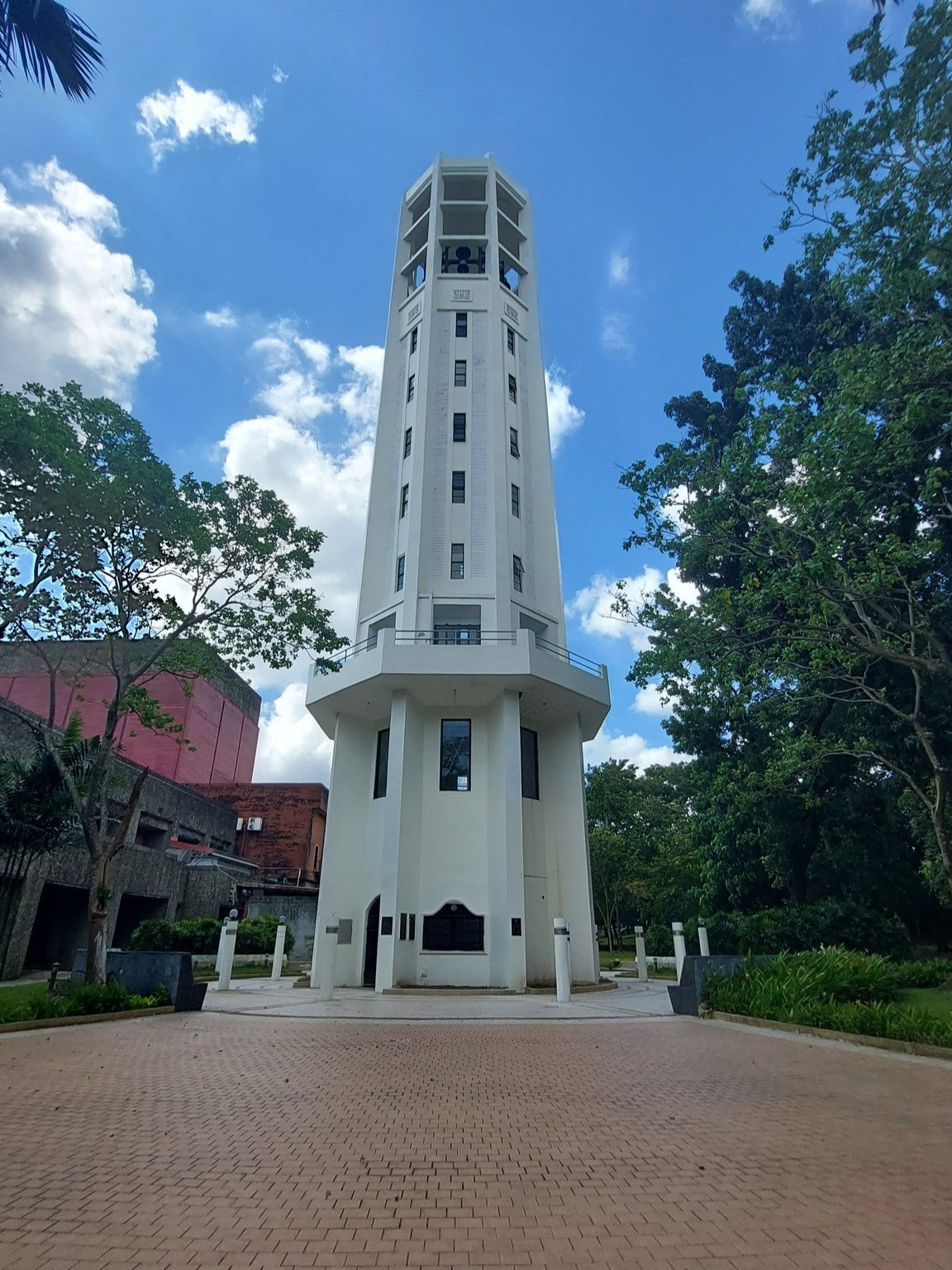
The Centennial Carillon Tower, located at the University of the Philippines Diliman.

- Los Baños, Laguna, Luzon: Within the University of the Philippines Los Baños campus, the Rizal Memorial Centenary Carillon, built in 1996, is named after Philippine National Hero José Rizal. It has 37 bells ranging from F three octaves below middle C up to G above middle C, making it the second largest non-traditional carillon in the Asia-Pacific region in terms of number of bells.
- Malolos, Bulacan, Luzon: In front of the Malolos Cathedral, a carillon tower of 23 bells was constructed in celebration of the Golden Jubilee of the Diocese of Malolos in 2012.
- Manila, Metro Manila, Luzon: The Lina Group of Companies donated 23 bells to the Manila Cathedral in 2014 to replace the 14 existing chime bells in preparation for the apostolic visit of Pope Francis to the country in 2015.
- Parañaque, Metro Manila, Luzon: In front of the Baclaran Church or National Shrine of Our Mother of Perpetual Help. The Carillon belfry was built as part of the Shrine's redevelopment plan and on September 8 of the same year, Cardinal Luis Antonio Tagle, Archbishop of Manila, blessed the newly built belfry. This is the first time the Shrine has had a bell tower in 60 years.
- Quezon City (Diliman), Luzon: 'The Bells of Diliman' in the Andrés Bonifacio Centennial Carillon Tower at the University of the Philippines Diliman. 1952, 36 bells by Petit & Fritsen. (Originally 46 bells by Van Bergen, until 2007.)

=== South Korea ===
- Daejeon: Daejeon Institute of Science and Technology – 77 bells, Petit & Fritsen 2001, additional 78th bell weighing c. 11,000 kg (24,000 lb) is not part of the carillon and only strikes the hour

== Europe ==
=== Belgium ===
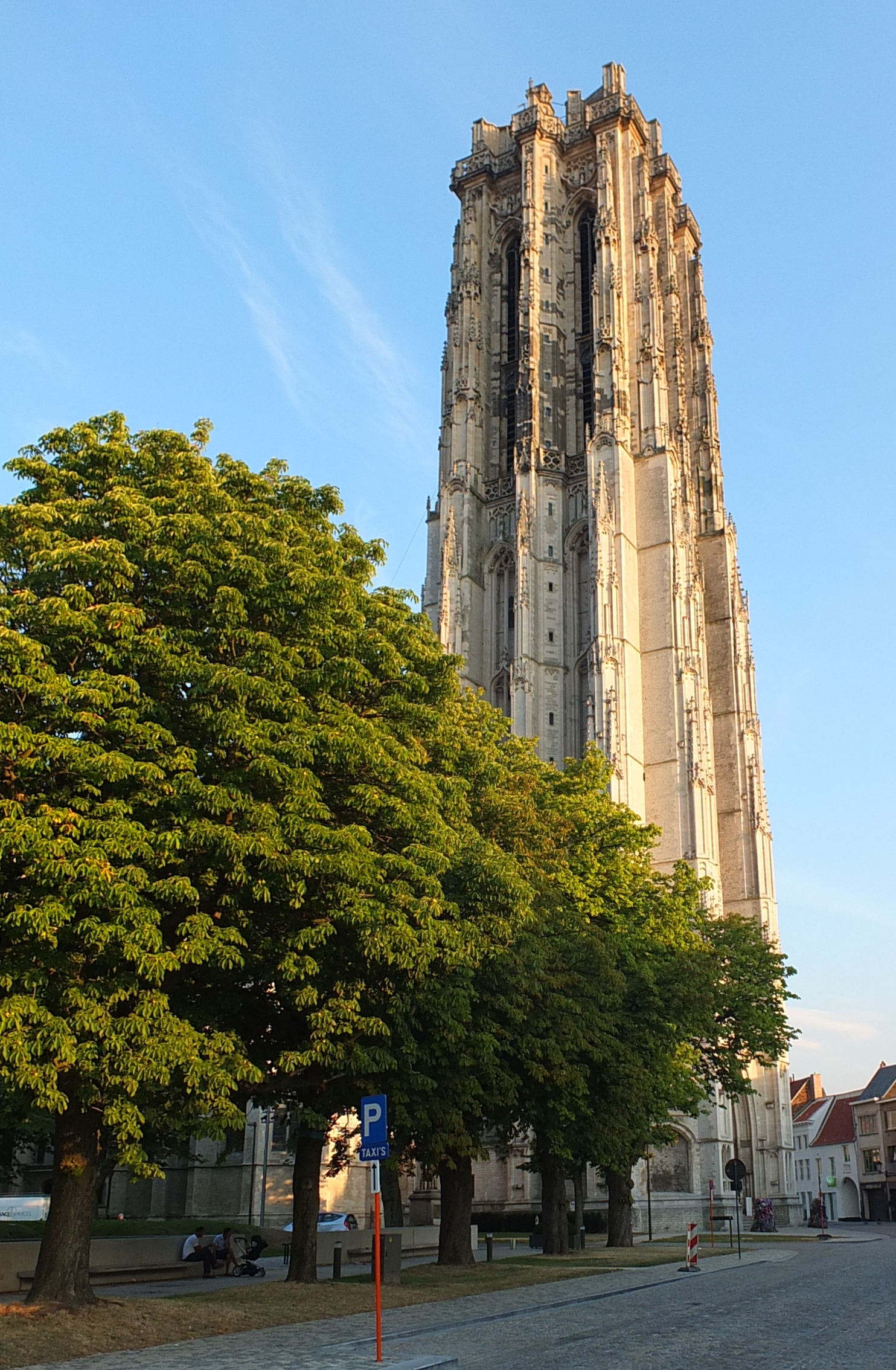
The tower of St. Rumbold's Cathedral in Mechelen contains two large, 49-bell carillons

Two Belgian carillon associations – the Flemish Carillon Association and the Walloon Carillon Association – count carillons in their respective regions. According to their registries, there are 94 carillons in Belgium: 70 in the Flemish Region, 22 in the Walloon Region, and 2 in the Brussels Capital Region. They are distributed across 77 different cities; several are located within the same city, and two are even within the same building – at St. Rumbold's Cathedral in Mechelen. The population has a wide range in total weights, with bourdons spanning between 30 and 8,180 kilograms (66 and 18,034 lb). They also span a wide range of notes, from 21 (which the Flemish association considers a carillon despite failing its definition that requires at least 23) up to 64. Many carillons were constructed over several centuries by several bellfounders; a minority are constructed entirely by a single bellfounder. The majority of carillons are transposing instruments, and often transpose such that the lowest note on the keyboard is B♭ or C.

According to the World Carillon Federation, the carillons in Belgium account for 14 percent of the world's total and is consequently considered one of the "great carillon countries" along with the Netherlands and the United States.

=== British Isles ===
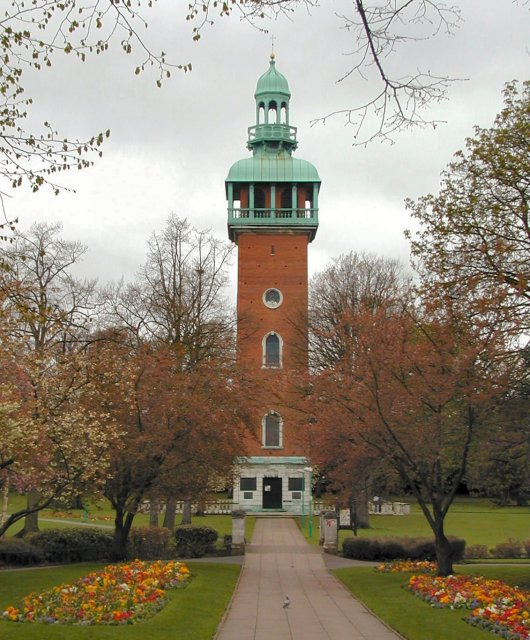
The Loughborough Carillon in Loughborough, England, memorialises fallen soldiers of the First World War

Carillons are found throughout the British Isles as a result of the First World War. During the German occupation of Belgium, many of the country's carillons were silenced or destroyed. This news circulated among the Allied Powers, who saw it as "the brutal annihilation of a unique democratic music instrument". The destruction was romanticized in poetry and music, particularly in England. Poets – often exaggerating reality – wrote that the Belgian carillons were in mourning and awaited to ring out on the day of the country's liberation. Edward Elgar composed a work for orchestra which includes motifs of bells and a spoken text anticipating the victory of the Belgian people. He later even composed a work specifically for the carillon. Following the war, countries in the Anglosphere built their own carillons to memorialise the lives lost and to promote world peace, including two in England.

The Carillon Society of Britain and Ireland (CSBI) counts carillons throughout the British Isles. Dove's Guide for Church Bell Ringers, a publication that historically concerns itself with bell sets outfitted for full circle ringing, also counts carillons in the region. According to the two sources, there are fifteen carillons: eight in England, one in the Republic of Ireland, one in Northern Ireland, and five in Scotland. There are no carillons in Guernsey, the Isle of Man, Jersey or Wales.

The heaviest carillon is at the Kirk of St Nicholas in Aberdeen, Scotland, weighing 25,846 kilograms (56,981 lb); the lightest is at the Atkinsons Building in London, weighing 3,194 kilograms (7,041 lb). The carillon of St Colman's Cathedral in Cobh has the most bells – 49. The region has several two- and three-octave carillons. The heaviest two-octave carillon in the world – weighing 22,669 kg (49,976 lb) – is located in Newcastle upon Tyne. The carillons were primarily constructed in the interwar period by the English bellfounders Gillett & Johnston and John Taylor & Co. Almost all of the carillons are transposing instruments, all of which transpose such that the lowest note on the keyboard is C.

According to the World Carillon Federation, the carillons of the British Isles account for two percent of the world's total.

=== France ===
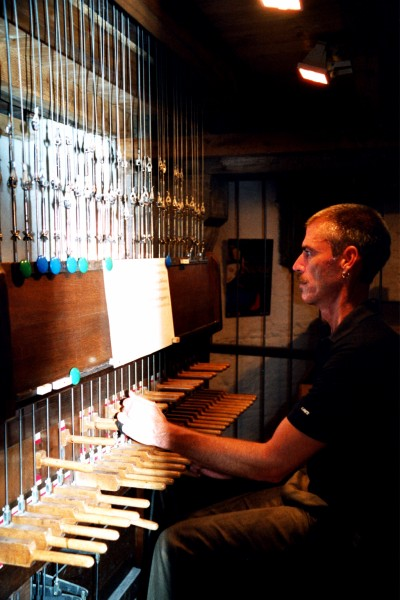
Carillonneur Brian Swager plays the carillon at the Cathedral Saint-Jean-Baptiste (John the Baptist) in Perpignan, France.

- Albi: Notre-Dame de la Drêche's church – 31 bells
- Annecy: Couvent de la Visitation – 37 bells, Fonderie Paccard.
- Arbois: Church of Saint-Just – 20 bells, heaviest unlisted, Goussel 1738, Fonderie Paccard 1913/1922, Bollée 1970
- Avranches: Basilica of St. Gervais and St. Protais – 30 bells, total weight 18,000 kg (40,000 lb), unknown 1762, Bollée 1899, Cornille-Havard 1982
- Bergues: Belfry of Bergues – 50 bells, total weight 6,400 kg (14,100 lb), J. Blampain 1628, Fonderie Hildebrand 1880, and Fonderie Paccard 1961/1973
- Blois: Notre-Dame-de-la-Trinité's Basilica – 48 bells, Fonderie Paccard
- Bourbourg: Église Saint-Jean-Baptiste de Bourbourg – 50 bells, total weight 3,000 kg (6,600 lb), Fonderie Paccard 2009
- Cappelle-la-Grande: Belfry of Cappelle-la-Grande – 48 bells, total weight 4,368 kg (9,630 lb), Fonderie Paccard 1985
- Carcassonne:
  - Basilique Saint-Nazaire – 38 bells
  - Église Saint-Vincent – 54 bells
- Castelnaudary: St Michel's Collegiate Church – 35 bells, Fonderie Paccard
- Castres: Church of Our Lady of Platé – 34 bells, total weight 3,630 kg (8,000 lb), unknown 1650, Louison 1847, and Fonderie Paccard 1976/2016
- Châlons-en-Champagne: Notre-Dame-en-Vaux – 56 bells, heaviest unlisted, bellfounders unlisted
- Chambéry: Château des Ducs de Savoie, 70 bells, Paccard.
- Châtellerault: Church of Saint-Jacques – 52 bells, heaviest unlisted, Bollée 1867 and Fonderie Paccard 1952
- Cholet: Sacré-Coeur's Church – 49 bells, Fonderie Paccard and Royal Eijsbouts
- Dijon: Carillon St Bénigne – 63 bells, Paccard
- Douai: Belfry of Douai – 62 bells, heaviest 5,500 kg (12,100 lb), Wauthy 1924 and Fonderie Paccard 1954/1974.
- Dunkirk: Belfry of Dunkirk – 50 bells, total weight 16,500 kg (36,400 lb), Fonderie Paccard 1962 and 2009
- Gourdon, Lot: Church of Saint Peter – 24 bells, total weight 6,103 kg (13,455 lb), Fonderie Paccard 1986
- Grézieu-la-Varenne: Saint-Roch Church – 30 bells, total weight c. 3,000 kg (6,600 lb), Chevalier 1825 and Fonderie Paccard 1939/2020
- Hombleux: Church of Saint-Médard – 16 bells (historical carillon), total weight 2,497 kg (5,505 lb), Fonderie Paccard 1931
- Hondschoote: St. Vaast Church – 61 bells, total weight 7,850 kg (17,310 lb), Fonderie Paccard 1999
- Lyon: 65 bells, Bell Tower of the City Hall.
- Lisieux: Ste Therese' basilica – 51 bells, Fonderie Paccard
- Magalas: Vins et Campanes's Museum – 40 bells, Michiels
- Maubeuge: St. Peter and St. Paul's Church – 28 bells, total weight 5,090 kg (11,220 lb), Causard 1965 and Fonderie Paccard 1975
- Montpellier: St François's church – 26 bells, Fonderie Paccard
- Miribel, Ain: Mas Rillier Carillon – 50 bells, total weight c. 7,800 kg (17,200 lb), Fonderie Paccard 1938–41
- Narbonne: St Just's Cathedral – 36 bells, Fonderie Paccard
- Orchies: Orchies Cathedral – 47 bells, total weight 3,745 kg (8,256 lb), Metz 1994–95
- Pamiers: Pamiers Cathedral – 49 bells, total weight 4,150 kg (9,150 lb), Fonderie Paccard 1988 and 1994
- Perpignan: Cathédrale Saint-Jean-Baptiste, 46 bells
- Poligny, Jura: Saint-Hippolyte Collegiate Church – 17 bells (historical carillon), heaviest unlisted, Farnier 1878–93 and Fonderie Paccard 1954
- Rouen: Rouen Cathedral – 64 bells, total weight c. 33 t (32 long tons; 36 short tons), Fonderie Paccard at various dates between 1920 and 2016
- Saint-Amand-Les-Eaux: Municipal museum of the abbey tower – 48 bells, total weight 7,500 kg (16,500 lb), Barbieux 1784, Michiels 1931, Fonderie Paccard 1950, and Cornille-Havard 1984
- Saint-Gaudens, Haute-Garonne: Collegiate Church of Saint Peter and Saint Paul – 36 bells, heaviest unlisted, Arnoldus Senherri 1356, Pourcel 1879, and Fonderie Paccard 1980/1981
- Saint-Quentin, Aisne: Hôtel de Ville – 37 bells, total weight c. 2,500 kg (5,500 lb), Cylindre Van Rie 1924
- Saint-Vincent-de-Paul, Landes: Basilique Notre-Dame de Buglose – 60 bells, Fonderie Paccard
- Seurre: St. Martin's Church – 47 bells, total weight, 3,490 kg (7,690 lb), Fonderie Paccard 1991–94
- Taninges: The parish church's 1939 15-bell chime became in 1998 a 26-bell carillon. 40 bells since 2000, Fonderie Paccard and Royal Eijsbouts.
- Tourcoing: Cathedral – 60 bells, plus a carillon museum located in the tower.
- Villefranche-de-Rouergue: Collegiate Church of Notre-Dame – 48 bells, total weight 11,200 kg (24,700 lb), Fonderie Paccard at various dates between 1636 and 1971, Dubois Frères 1819, and Cornille-Havard-Bergamo 2014

=== Germany ===
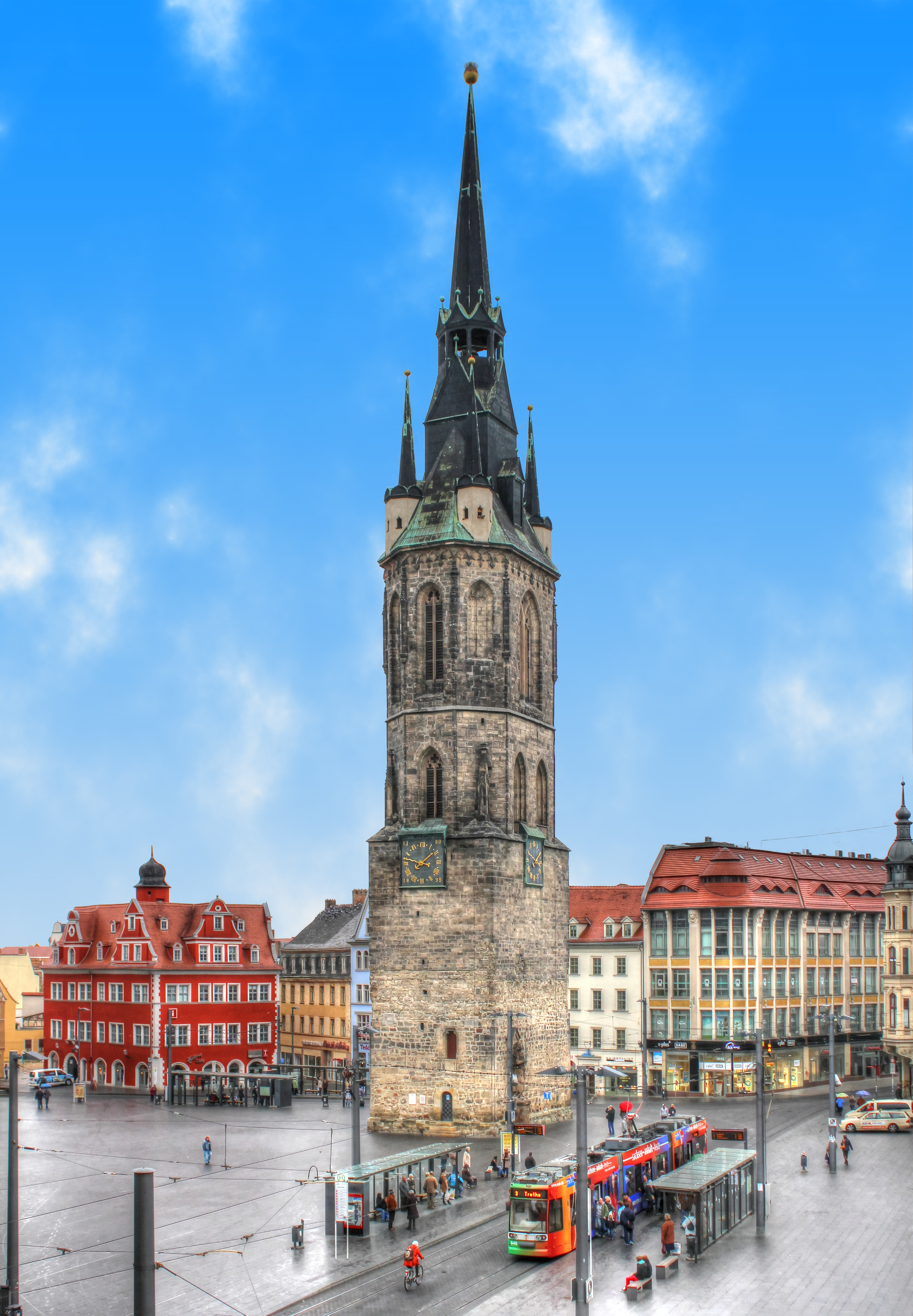
Germany's heaviest carillon is in Halle (Saale) with bells weighing more than 45,000 kg (99,000 lb) in total

The German Carillon Association counts carillons throughout Germany, and according to the organization, there are 49 in total. They are distributed across 41 cities; in four of them – Berlin, Bonn, Cologne, and Hamburg – there are more than one. The population has a wide range in total weights, with bourdons spanning from 20 kilograms (44 lb) in Altenburg and Schwerin to 8,056 kilograms (17,760 lb) in Halle (Saale). They also span a wide range of notes, from 23 in Bonn and Lößnitz up to 76 in Halle (Saale). The carillons were all exclusively constructed after 1900 by a mix of bellfounders, many of them German. The majority of carillons are transposing instruments, and often transpose such that the lowest note on the keyboard is B♭ or C. There are also two mobile carillons, which were constructed and are owned by two German bellfounders: Perner and Sandkuhl.

According to the World Carillon Federation, the carillons of Germany account for seven percent of the world's total.

=== Netherlands ===
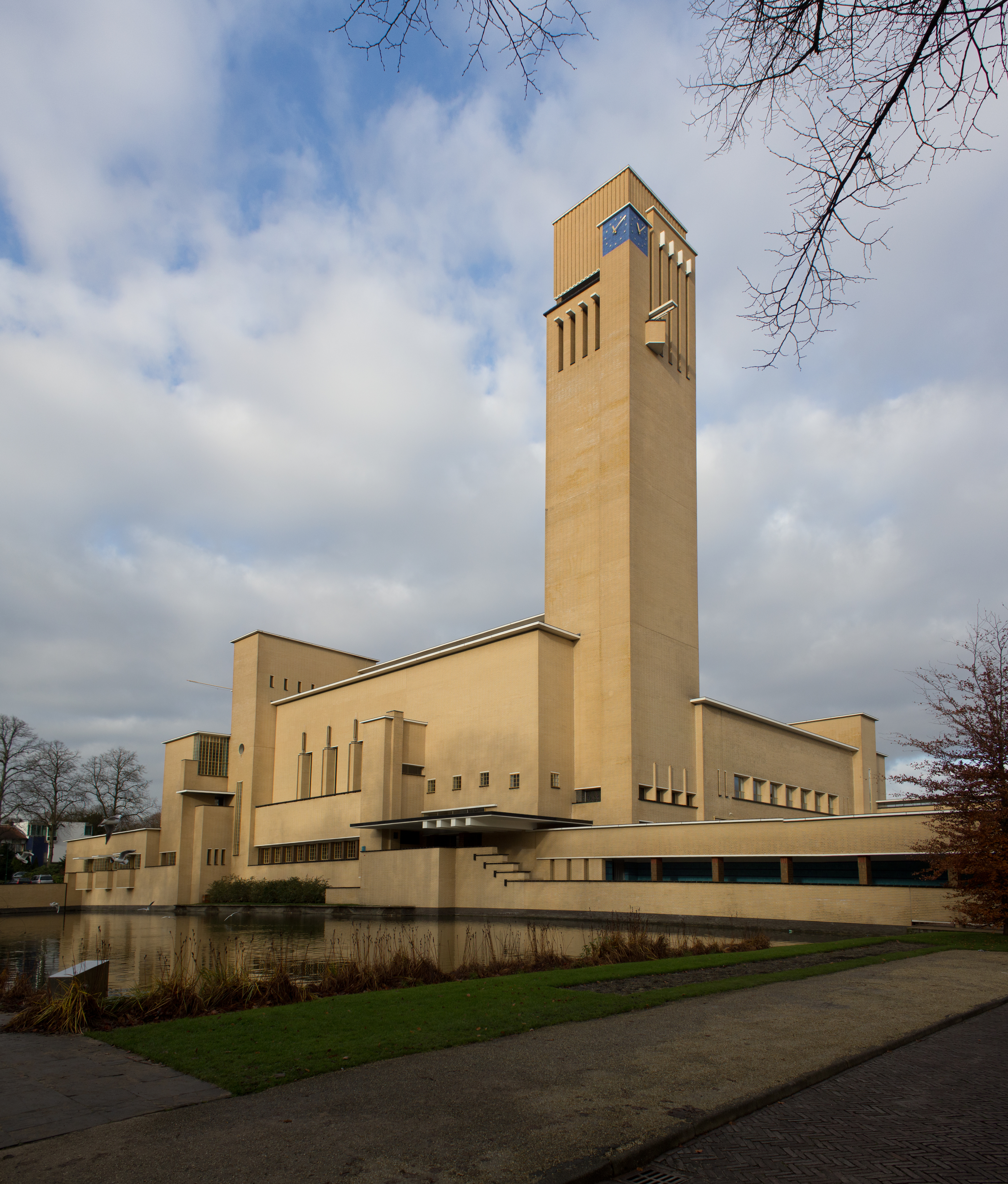
Hilversum town hall

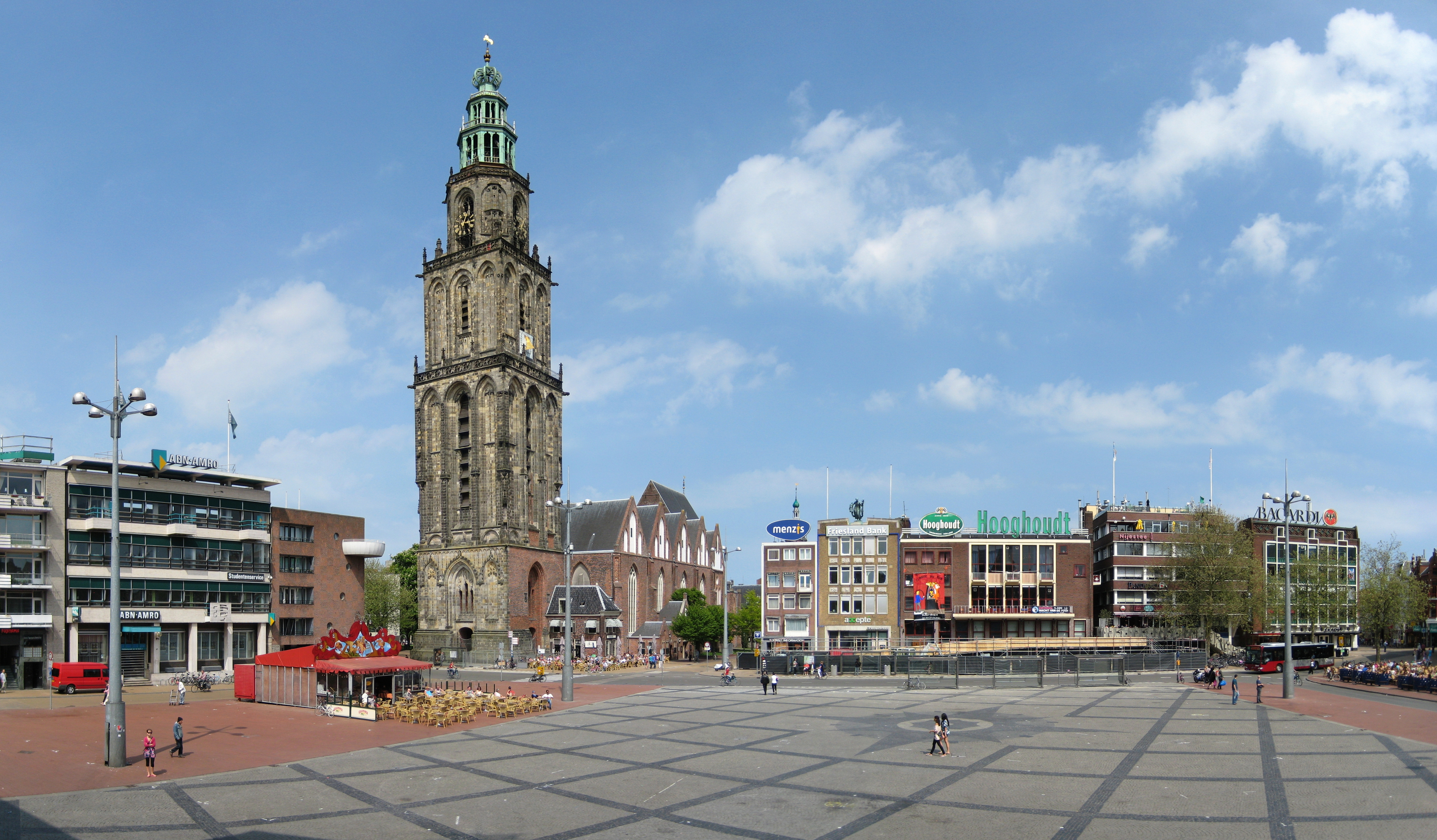
Martinikerk in Groningen

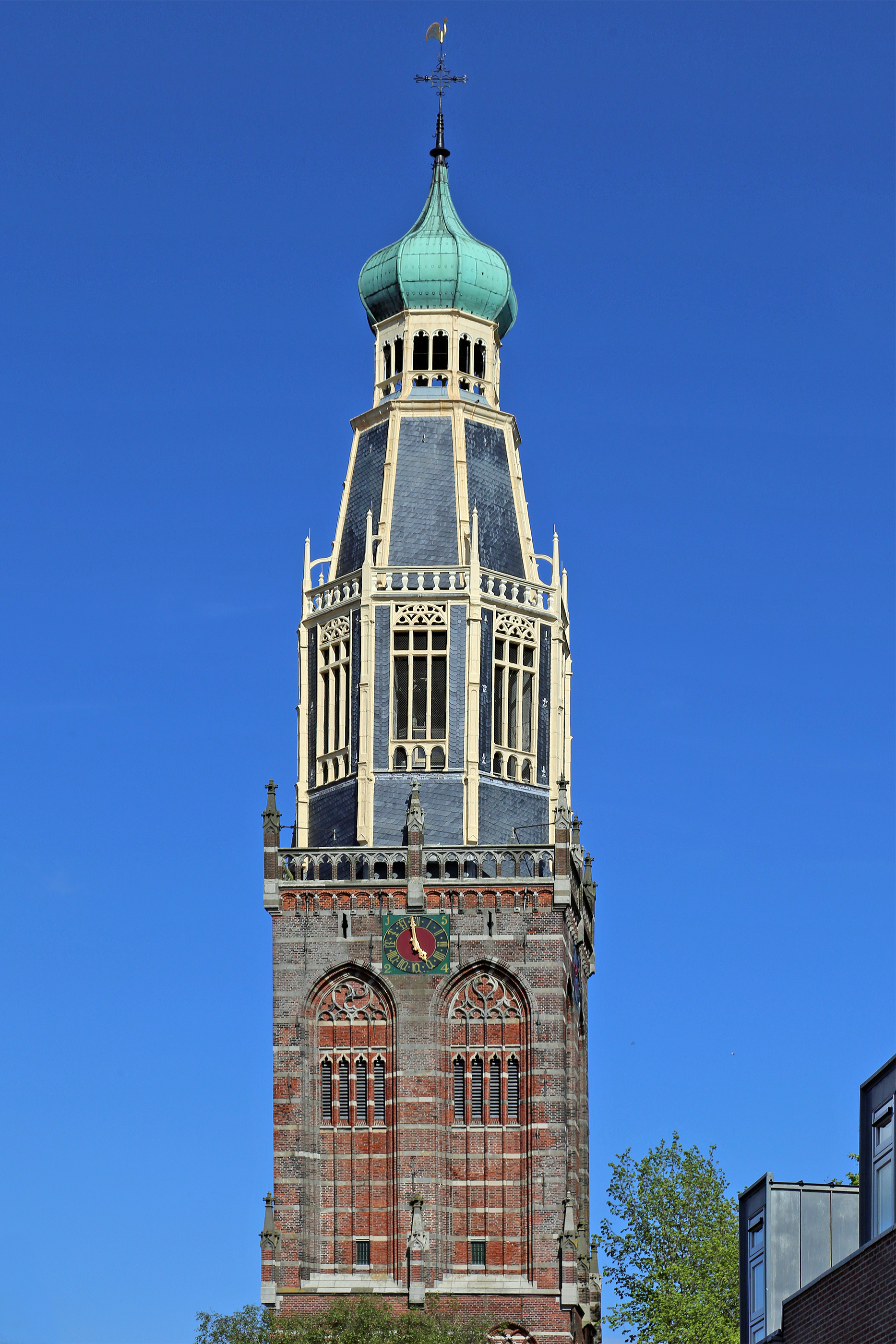
Zuiderkerk in Enkhuizen

- Alkmaar:
  - Waag, 47 bells by Melchior de Haze and Royal Eijsbouts
  - Grote or St. Laurenskerk, 37 bells by Melchior de Haze and Royal Eijsbouts
- Almere
  - Haven: 47 bells by Royal Eijsbouts
  - Stad: 47 bells by Royal Eijsbouts
- Amersfoort:
  - Belgian Monument housing carillon frequently used for practice by students of the Netherlands Carillon School. 48 bells.
  - Onze Lieve Vrouwe Toren. Two functional carillons, the older with 35 bells, the newer with 58. Old carillon: Hemony (1659–1664), plus 3 bells by Melchior de Haze and Pieter Hemony (1674), by Jan Albert de Grave (1725), and by Royal Eijsbouts (1953). New carillon: Royal Eijsbouts 1997.
- Amsterdam:
  - Carillons in the Westertoren, Munttoren, cupola of the Royal Palace, Zuidertoren, Rijksmuseum, Plein '40-'45, Jewelry Siebel in the Kalverstraat, the Vrije Universiteit and Oude Kerkstoren.
  - Slotermeer: Freedom Carillon – 31 bells, heaviest 257 kg (567 lb), Van Bergen 1952 and Petit & Fritsen 1995
- Arnhem: St Eusebius' Church – 53 bells, heaviest 9,100 kg (20,100 lb), Petit & Fritsen of various dates between 1958 and 1994
- Barneveld : Jan van Schaffelaar Toren. 51 bells
- Bergen: Ruïnekerk – 26 bells, heaviest 132 kg (291 lb), Petit & Fritsen 1970
- Bergen op Zoom: Stadstoren de Peperbus. 48 bells by Eijsbouts
- Brunssum:
  - Gemeentehuis. 38 bells.
  - Bakkerij vanEeghem. 23
- Cuijk
- Den Helder: Nationaal Monument voor het Reddingswezen, 30 bells by Van Bergen and 19 bells from a later date.
- Doesburg: Martinikerk – 48 bells, heaviest 1,786 kg (3,937 lb), Hemony brothers 1654 and Royal Eijsbouts 1964/2015
- Dordrecht: Grote-Kerkstoren. 67 bells, 52 t: heaviest carillon in Europe and eighth heaviest in the world.
- Eindhoven:
  - City Hall
  - St. Catharinakerk
  - Demer
- Emmeloord: Poldertoren. 48 bells.
- Enkhuizen:
  - The Zuider- St Pancrastoren. 52 bells. François and Pierre Hemony
  - The Drommedaris. 39 bells. Pieter Hemony
- Enschede: Carillon at the University of Twente.
- Garderen: Oude Kerkstoren. 44 bells. Carillon designed and built by Het Molenpad Expertise. Bells tuned to 'Bach Temperament'.
- Gouda: Sint Janstoren. 50 bells
- Groningen:
  - Academy Building, University of Groningen
  - Martinitoren, 52 bells.
- The Hague: Peace Palace – 48 bells, heaviest 1,190 kg (2,620 lb), Royal Eijsbouts of various dates between 1994 and 2013
- Heerlen: Sint Pancratiustoren. 49 bells
- Heiligerlee: National Monument for Mobilisation Victims of the First World War – 49 bells, heaviest c. 1,475 kg (3,252 lb), Van Bergen 1965 and 1967–68
- Hilvarenbeek: Sint Petrustoren. 50 bells by Van Bergen (1949) and Rudolf Perner (2010).
- Hilversum: Raadhuis Hilversum Town Hall 48 bells by Klokkengieterij Eysbouts, Asten NL (1958).
- Hoorn: Grote Kerk. 52 bells by Van Bergen and Eijsbouts
- Kampen: Nieuwe Toren (new tower) - 48 bells by François Hemony (2011)
- Maastricht:
  - Sint Servaastoren. 59 bells
  - Stadhuistoren. 43 bells. by François and Pierre Hemony 1663/1664
- Nieuwegein: Pakrbeiaard, 47 klokken Eijsbouts 1985
- Roermond: Roermond City Hall. 49 bells, 4 octaves to be played automatic or manual.
- Meppel: Meppeler Carillon – 47 bells, heaviest c. 650 kg (1,430 lb), Van Bergen 1948–49 and Eijsbouts 1973
- Moordrecht: Dorpstoren. 43 bells by Eijsbouts (1960) and Rudolf Perner (2011)
- Nijmegen: St. Stevenschurch. 47 bells by A.J vd Gheyn and Eijsbouts
- Oosterbeek: Oosterbeek Town Hall – 37 bells, heaviest 268 kg (591 lb), Royal Eijsbouts 1966 and 1974
- Roosendaal
- Schoonhoven: Stadhuis. 50 bells, largest set of bells by Andreas Joseph van den Gheyn (1767 - 1777)
- Utrecht: Dom Tower. 50 bells.
- Venlo: Sint Martinustoren. 54 bells.
- Venray: Sint Petrus' Banden-toren. 50bells.
- Waalre: Provincial Memorial Monument – 37 bells, heaviest c. 700 kg (1,500 lb), Petit & Fritsen 1950 and 2007
- Weert: Sint Martinustoren. 49 bells
- Zierikzee:
  - City Hall. 38 bells by Taylor/Eijsbouts
  - Zuidhavenpoort. 12 bells 1550-1554 by Peter I van den Ghein,
- Zutphen: Wijnhuistoren, 47 bells mostly by Eijsbouts, but including the low octave E1 bell by Pieter and François Hemony, created in Zutphen (1644) for the first ever made well tuned carillon.

=== Nordic countries ===
According to the Nordic Society for Campanology and Carillons, there are 56 carillons in the Nordic countries: 29 in Denmark, 1 in Finland, 12 in Norway, and 14 in Sweden.

==== Denmark ====
- Aalborg: Budolfi Church – 48 bells, heaviest 1,275 kg (2,811 lb), Petit & Fritsen 1970 and 2008
- Aarhus: Aarhus City Hall – 48 bells, heaviest unlisted, Sørensen 1948, Rincker 1964, 2017 Thubalka
- Allingåbro: Vejlby Church – 27 bells, heaviest 400 kg (880 lb), Royal Eijsbouts 2011
- Brøndby Strand: Brøndby Strand Church – 48 bells, heaviest 1,270 kg (2,800 lb), Petit & Fritsen 1986
- Copenhagen:
  - Church of Our Saviour – 48 bells, heaviest 2,250 kg (4,960 lb), Sørensen/Smithske 1928 and Petit & Fritsen 1981
  - Church of the Holy Ghost – 49 bells, heaviest 2,200 kg (4,900 lb), Thubalka 1947 and Royal Eijsbouts 2003
  - Margrethekirken – 38 bells, heaviest 225 kg (496 lb), Petit & Fritsen 1970
- Faaborg: Faaborg Clock Tower – 38 bells, heaviest 315 kg (694 lb), Petit & Fritsen 1960
- Frederiksberg: Frederiksberg Town Hall – 48 bells, heaviest 1,250 kg (2,760 lb), Sørensen 1953 and Thubalka 2012
- Frederikshavn: Frederikshavn Church – 24 bells, heaviest 75 kg (165 lb), Petit & Fritsen 1985
- Grenaa: Grenaa Church – 48 bells, heaviest 665 kg (1,466 lb), Fonderie Paccard 1995 and Thubalka 2012
- Herning: Herning Church – 48 bells, heaviest 1,250 kg (2,760 lb), Fonderie Paccard/Thubalka 1989
- Hillerød: Frederiksborg Castle – 28 bells, heaviest 650 kg (1,430 lb), Van Aerschodt 1887 and Thubalka 2003
- Holbæk: Saint Nicolai Church – 48 bells, heaviest 375 kg (827 lb), Royal Eijsbouts 1979 and Thubalka 2009
- Holstebro:
  - Nørrelandskirken – 48 bells, heaviest 450 kg (990 lb), Royal Eijsbouts 1969 and Thubalka 1999
  - Saint George's Church – 48 bells, heaviest 1,535 kg (3,384 lb), Royal Eijsbouts/Thubalka 1974
- Holte: Søllerød Castle – 27 bells, heaviest 140 kg (310 lb), Michiels 1929 and Thubalka 2014
- Kalundborg: Church of Our Lady – 48 bells, heaviest 640 kg (1,410 lb), Fonderie Paccard 2013
- Kolding: Saint Nicolai Church – 48 bells, heaviest 1,275 kg (2,811 lb), Petit & Fritsen 1973
- Løgumkloster: Carillon Park – 49 bells, heaviest 1,275 kg (2,811 lb), Petit & Fritsen 1973
- Marstal: Marstal Church – 48 bells, heaviest 640 kg (1,410 lb), Royal Eijsbouts 1988 and Thubalka 2012
- Odense: St. Canute's Cathedral – 48 bells, heaviest 635 kg (1,400 lb), Petit & Fritsen 1989
- Randers: St Martin's Church – 48 bells, heaviest 370 kg (820 lb), Petit & Fritsen 1994
- Silkeborg: Silkeborg Church – 48 bells, heaviest 320 kg (710 lb), Petit & Fritsen 1966 and Thubalka 2008
- Stouby: Rohden Gods – 48 bells, heaviest 375 kg (827 lb), Royal Eijsbouts 2010 and Thubalka 2012
- Svendborg: Vor Frue Kirke – 36 bells, heaviest 375 kg (827 lb), Søorensen 1946, Petit & Fritsen 1958, and Royal Eijsbouts 2009/2011
- Thisted: Thisted Church – 48 bells, heaviest 940 kg (2,070 lb), Fonderie Paccard 2003 and Thubalka 2012
- Varde: Saint Jacob's Church – 42 bells, heaviest 265 kg (584 lb), Petit & Fritsen 1963
- Vejle: St. Nicolai Church – 48 bells, heaviest 1,285 kg (2,833 lb), Royal Eijsbouts 1976 and Thubalka 1980

==== Finland ====
- Vantaa: Tikkurila Church – 31 bells, heaviest 445 kg (981 lb), Royal Eijsbouts 2020, Finland's first-ever carillon

==== Norway ====
- Bærum: Bærum City Hall – 39 bells, heaviest unlisted, Olsen Nauen 2009
- Bergen: St John's Church – 48 bells, heaviest 2,200 kg (4,900 lb), Royal Eijsbouts 2014
- Bodø: Bodø Cathedral – 49 bells, heaviest unlisted, Royal Eijsbouts 2011
- Drammen: Bragernes Church – 35 bells, heaviest unlisted, Bergholtz 1961
- Haugesund: Vår Frelsers Church – 38 bells, heaviest unlisted, Olsen Nauen 2013
- Molde: Molde Cathedral – 26 bells, heaviest unlisted, Olsen Nauen 1983
- Oslo:
  - Oslo City Hall – 49 bells, heaviest unlisted, Olsen Nauen 1999
  - Oslo Cathedral – 48 bells, heaviest unlisted, Olsen Nauen 2003
  - Uranienborg Church – 37 bells, heaviest unlisted, Olsen Nauen 2004
- Sandefjord: Sandefjord Church – 49 bells, heaviest unlisted, Sergeys 1931 and Royal Eijsbouts 2016
- Stavanger: Stavanger Cathedral – 49 bells, heaviest unlisted, Warner 1922 and Olsen Nauen 1998/2000
- Trondheim: Nidaros Cathedral – 37 bells, heaviest unlisted, Olsen Nauen 1976

==== Sweden ====
- Gävle: Gävle Town Hall – 36 bells, heaviest 285 kg (628 lb), Bergholtz 1972
- Gothenburg: German Church, Gothenburg – 42 bells, heaviest 285 kg (628 lb), Bergholtz 1961
- Härnösand: Härnösand Cathedral – 37 bells, heaviest 285 kg (628 lb), Bergholtz 1981
- Karlskrona: Fredrik Church – 35 bells, heaviest 640 kg (1,410 lb), Bergholtz 1967
- Landskrona: Sofia Albertina Church – 43 bells, 640 kg (1,410 lb), Bergholtz 1967
- Linköping: Saint Lars Church – 36 bells, heaviest 285 kg (628 lb), Bergholtz 1972
- Malmö: Malmö City Hall – 48 bells, heaviest 640 kg (1,410 lb), Petit & Fritsen 1970
- Norrköping: Norrköping Town Hall – 48 bells, heaviest 680 kg (1,500 lb), Bergholtz 1963 and 1983
- Stockholm:
  - St. Gertrude's Church – 37 bells, heaviest 750 kg (1,650 lb), Hemony brothers 1665, Petit & Fritsen 1875, M & O Ohlsson 1888, and Royal Eijsbouts 2008
  - Hedvig Eleonora Church – 24 bells, heaviest 285 kg (628 lb), Bergholtz 1968
  - Klara Church – 35 bells, heaviest 1,560 kg (3,440 lb), Bergholtz 1965
- Västerås: Västerås City Hall – 47 bells, heaviest 2,200 kg (4,900 lb), Royal Eijsbouts 1960
- Växjö: Växjö Cathedral – 25 bells, heaviest 580 kg (1,280 lb), Bergholtz 1962
- Visby: Visby Cathedral – 45 bells, heaviest 680 kg (1,500 lb), Bergholtz 1960

=== Other regions ===
==== Austria ====
Heiligenkreuz Abbey, which claims to be the only Cistercian institution that owns a carillon, acknowledges that the tradition of playing carillons is not popular in Austria.

- Heiligenkreuz: Heiligenkreuz Abbey – 43 bells, heaviest unlisted, Royal Eijsbouts 1982–2004
- Innsbruck: Innsbruck Cathedral – 48 bells, heaviest c. 650 kg (1,430 lb), Royal Eijsbouts 1979 and at some point before

==== Bosnia and Herzegovina ====
- Medjugorje: St. James Church – 47 bells, Royal Eijsbouts 1990

==== Czech Republic ====
- Prague:
  - Loretánské náměstí – 30 bells, Fremy 1683–91, Lisiak 1747, Manousek 1994
  - (mobile carillon) "The Traveling Carillon of Prague" – 57 bells, 4,950 kg (10,910 lb) total weight, Royal Eijsbouts 2001

==== Lithuania ====
- Gelgaudiškis: Gelgaudiškis Manor. 36 bells by Royal Eijsbouts (2015)
- Kaunas: Vytautas the Great War Museum. 49 bells (1937/2006)
- Klaipėda: Tower of Central Post Office. 48 bells by Royal Eijsbouts (1987/2006)
- Šakiai: 24 bells by Royal Eijsbouts (2015)
- Telšiai: Cathedral Square. 23 bells by Royal Eijsbouts (2017)
- Vilnius: Church of Sts Apostles Philip and James. 61 bells by Royal Eijsbouts (2015)

==== Luxembourg ====
- Echternach: Echternach Basilica – 50 bells, Reuter 2008

==== Poland ====
Annual concerts since 1999 during the Gdańsk Carillon Festival. See also Traveling carillons below.

- Gdańsk: St Catherine's Church - 50 bells, 17 t, 1998 (1989-2006), Royal Eijsbouts. Previous instruments: 1738–1905, 1910-1942
- Gdańsk: Main Town Hall - 37 bells, 3.3 t, 2000, Royal Eijsbouts. Previous instrument: 1561-1945
- Częstochowa: Jasna Góra Monastery - 36 bells, 1906 (Note: This carillon or its keyboard might not be in fully working order.)

==== Portugal ====
- Alverca: Church of the Little Shepherds – 69 bells, heaviest unlisted, Royal Eijsbouts 2005
- Constância (mobile carillon): "Lvsitanvs Carillon" – 63 bells, total weight 6,857 kg (15,117 lb), Royal Eijsbouts 2010s
- Leiria: Igreja de São Pedro – 47 bells, heaviest unlisted, Petit & Fritsen 2004, unknown bellfounder after 2004
- Mafra:
  - Palace of Mafra:
    - South tower – 53 bells, heaviest unlisted, Witlockx/Van Aerschodt 1730, Royal Eijsbouts 1986
    - North tower – 45 bells, heaviest unlisted, Levache et al. 1730, Van Aerschodt 1928
- Porto: Clérigos Church – 49 bells, heaviest unlisted, Royal Eijsbouts 1996

==== Russia ====
- Saint Petersburg:
  - Saints Peter and Paul Cathedral – 51 bells, heaviest unlisted, Petit & Fritsen 2001
  - Peterhof Palace – 51 bells, heaviest unlisted, Petit & Fritsen 2005

==== Serbia ====
- Belgrade: Church of Saint Sava – 45 bells, heaviest 6,128 kg (13,510 lb), Grassmayr 2001

==== Spain ====
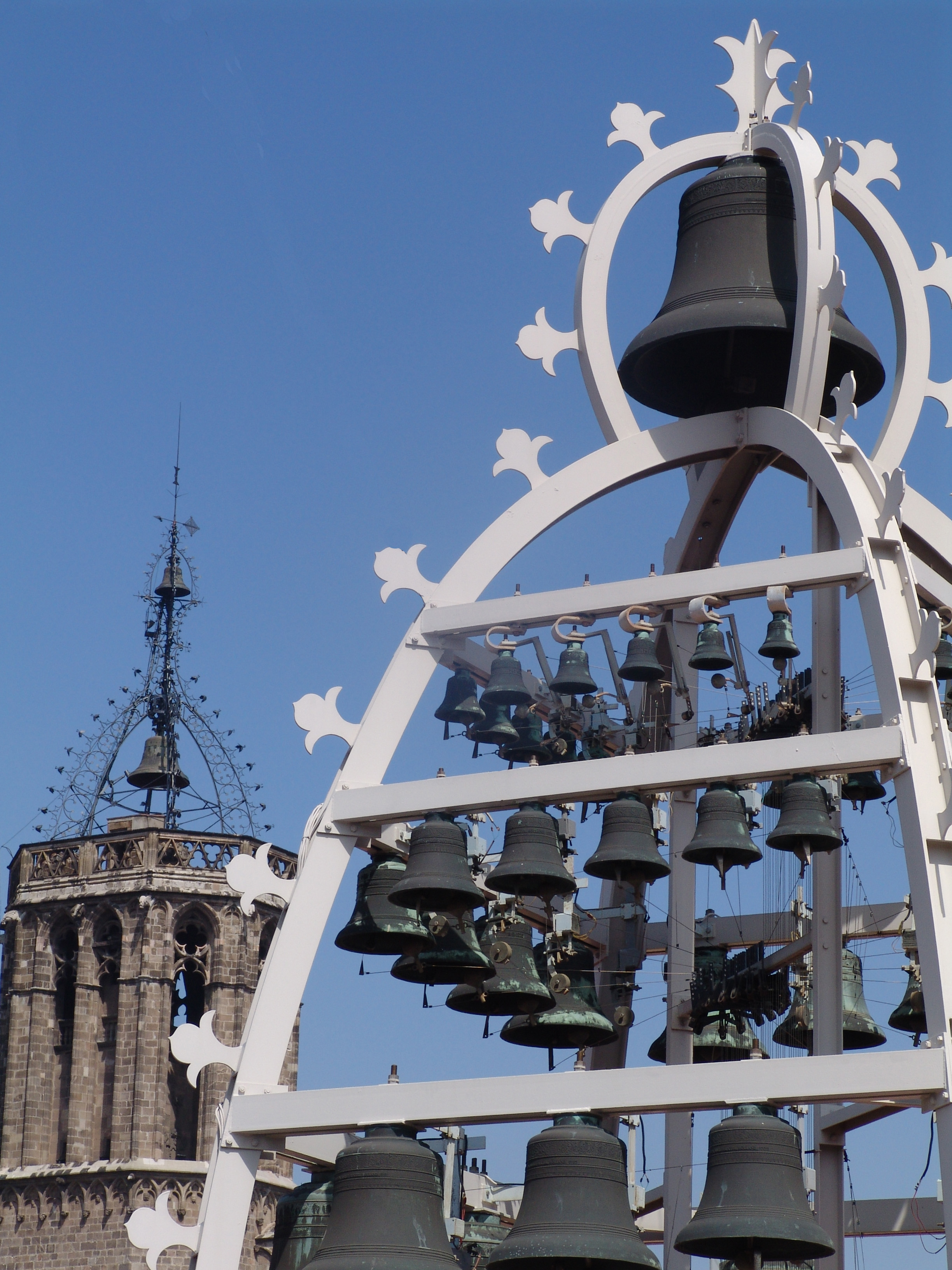
Carillon at Palau de la Generalitat, in Barcelona

- Barcelona: Palau de la Generalitat de Catalunya – 49 bells, Petit & Fritsen 1977
- Bilbao: Basilica of Begoña – 24 bells, Rüetschi
- Córdoba: San Pablo – 36 bells, Fonderie Paccard 1900, unknown bellfounder 1998
- San Lorenzo de El Escorial: El Escorial – 47 bells, de Haze 1676 and Royal Eijsbouts 1988
- Villarreal: Basilica of San Pasqual Baylón – 72 bells, Royal Eijsbouts 1997

==== Switzerland ====
- Carouge: Église Sainte-Croix – 36 bells, heaviest unlisted, Aubry 17th century, Pitton 1787, Kervand 1839, and Rüetschi 2001
- Geneva: St. Pierre Cathedral – 37 bells, heaviest unlisted, Fribor 1460, Paccard-Rüetschi 1931, Rüetschi 1986/1991, and Fonderie Paccard 2011
- Lens: Eglise Saint-Pierre-aux-Liens – 24 bells, heaviest unlisted, Rüetschi at various dates between 1958 and 1995
- Pully: Église de Rosiaz – 48 bells, heaviest unlisted, by Royal Eijsbouts 1953, Rudolf Perner 2011, and Laudy 2014.
- Saint-Maurice: Abbaye – 49 bells, heaviest unlisted, Rüetschi 1947, Royal Eijsbouts 2004, and Fonderie Paccard 2010

==== Ukraine ====
Anthem of Ukraine. Carillon of St. Michael's Golden-Domed Monastery. Kyiv, Ukraine

- Hoshiv: Basilian Monastery – 52 bells, heaviest unlisted, Petit & Fritsen 2014–15
- Kyiv:
  - St. Michael's Golden-Domed Monastery – 50 bells, heaviest unlisted, [Ukrainian bellfounders] 1998–99
  - St. Nicholas Military Cathedral – 51 bells, heaviest unlisted, Royal Eijsbouts 2018
  - St.Theodosius Pechersky Monastery – 51 bells, heaviest unlisted, [Ukrainian bellfounders] 2019
- Kolomyia: Saint Josaphat Kuntsevych – 51 bells, heaviest unlisted, Royal Eijsbouts 2019

== North America ==
=== Bermuda ===
- Pembroke: St John the Evangelist Anglican Church – 25 bells, John Taylor & Co 1970

=== Canada ===
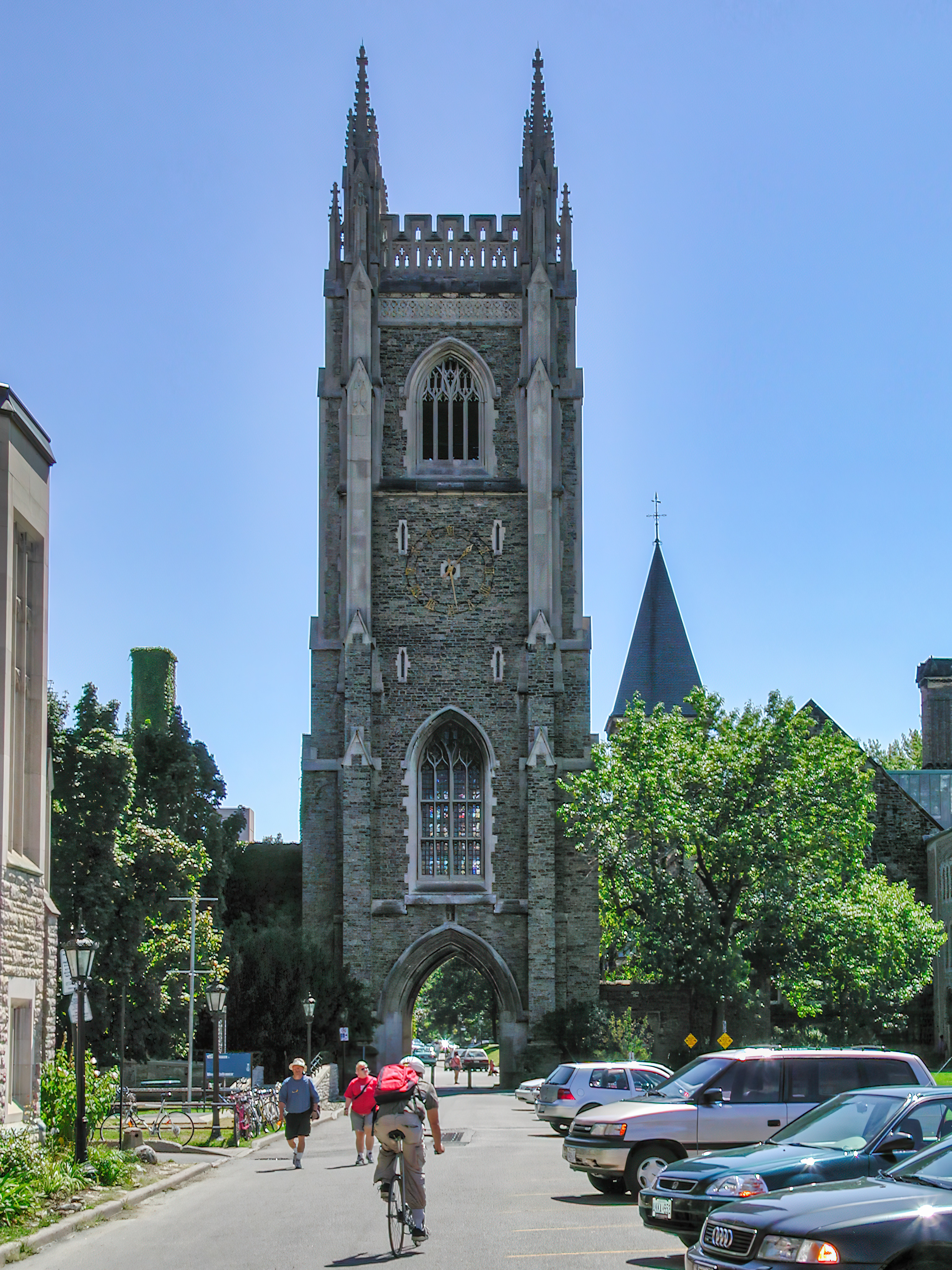
Soldiers' Tower, University of Toronto

- Guelph: St. George's Anglican Church – 36 bells, 1926
- Hamilton, Ontario: Cathedral of Christ the King – 23 bells, 1933
- Montreal: Saint Joseph's Oratory – 56 bells, 1956
- Niagara Falls: Rainbow Tower – 55 bells, 1947
- Ottawa:
  - Peace Tower – 53 bells, heaviest 10,090 kg (22,240 lb), Gillett & Johnston 1927
  - St-Jean-Baptiste Church – 47 bells, 1940
- Simcoe: Norfolk War Memorial – 23 bells, 1925
- Toronto:
  - Soldiers' Tower (University of Toronto) – 51 bells, heaviest 2,494 kg (5,498 lb), Gillett & Johnston 1927 and Petit & Fritsen 1975
  - Exhibition Place Carillon – 50 bells, 1974
  - Massey/Drury Memorial Carillon at Metropolitan United Church. 54 bells, increased from 23 bells in 1922.
- Victoria: Netherlands Centennial Carillon – 62 bells, heaviest c. 1,500 kg (3,300 lb), Petit & Fritsen 1967 and 1971

=== Cuba ===
- Havana: Our Lady of Lourdes Church – 49 bells, Petit & Fritsen 1958

=== Curaçao ===
- Willemstad: Curaçao Museum – 47 bells, heaviest 655 kg (1,444 lb), Royal Eijsbouts 1951

=== El Salvador ===
- San Salvador: Don Rua Church – 35 bells, Petit & Fritsen 1963

=== Honduras ===
- Tegucigalpa: Basilica of Suyapa – 42 bells, Petit & Fritsen 1960

=== Mexico ===
- Mexico City, D.F.: The Banobras Carillon. 47 bells, in the world's tallest carillon tower (125m), which is part of the old headquarters of the Banco Nacional de Obras y Servicios Publicos in the Tlatelolco neighbourhood.
- San Luis Potosí, San Luis Potosí, The San Luis Potosí Cathedral has a carillon installed in 2010 with 32 bells. In addition, it has an electronic device that rings the bells when the cathedral clock strikes the hour.

=== Nicaragua ===
- León: Cathedral of St. Peter – 25 bells, Petit & Fritsen 1959

=== United States ===
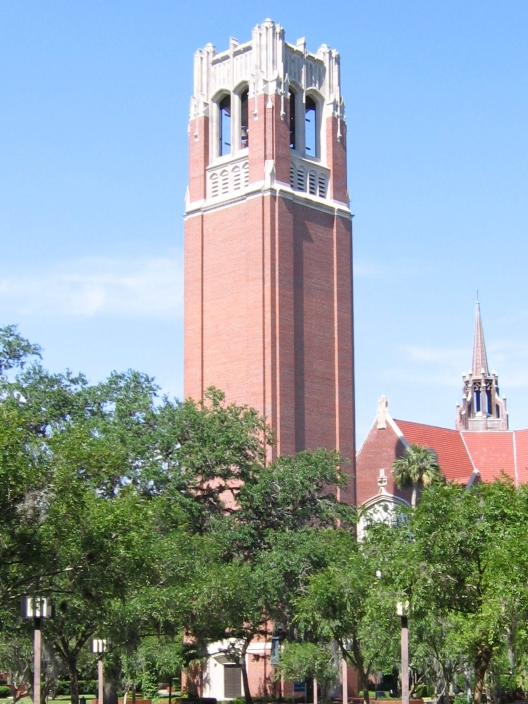
Century Tower. Gainesville, Florida

Selections of notable carillons in the United States:

- Albany, New York: Albany City Hall – 49 bells c. 5,080 kg (11,200 lb), John Taylor & Co 1986 and 1989
- Allendale, Michigan: Cook Carillon Tower (Grand Valley State University), 48 bells, heaviest c. 3,000 lb (1,400 kg), Royal Eijsbouts 1994
- Ann Arbor, Michigan:
  - Burton Memorial Tower (University of Michigan) – 55 bells, heaviest c. 24,000 lb (11,000 kg), John Taylor & Co 1936 and 2011
  - Lurie Tower (University of Michigan) – 60 bells, heaviest c. 12,000 lb (5,400 kg), Royal Eijsbouts 1996
- Arlington, Virginia: Netherlands Carillon – 53 bells, heaviest 5,740 kg (12,650 lb), Van Bergen/Petit & Fritsen/Royal Eijsbouts 1954, Royal Eijsbouts 1995 and 2020
- Austin, Texas: Main Building (University of Texas at Austin) – 56 bells
- Berkeley, California: Sather Tower (University of California, Berkeley) – 61 bells, 1917, 1978, and 1983.
- Chicago, Illinois: Rockefeller Chapel (University of Chicago) – 72 bells, heaviest 36,990 pounds (16,780 kg), Gillett & Johnston 1932
- Dayton, Ohio: Deeds Carillon, Carillon Historical Park, 1942. 57 bells by Petit & Fritsen. Refurbished in 1988 from an electronic to a traditional carillon.
- East Lansing, Michigan: Beaumont Tower (Michigan State University) – 49 bells, 1928, 1935, and 19__, renovated by Royal Eijsbouts 1996
- Gainesville, Florida: Century Tower (University of Florida) – 61 bells, heaviest 3,172 kg (6,993 lb), Royal Eijsbouts 1979 and 2003
- Grand Rapids, Michigan: The Beckering Family Carillon on the Pew Campus of Grand Valley State University.
- Lake Wales, Florida: Singing Tower (Bok Tower Gardens) – 60 bells, heaviest 23,000 pounds (10,000 kg) John Taylor & Co 1928
- Lawrence, Kansas: World War II Memorial Carillon (University of Kansas) – 53 bells, heaviest c. 6,100 kg (13,400 lb), John Taylor & Co 1949–51
- Mercersburg, Pennsylvania: Mercersburg Academy – 50 bells, heaviest 3,175 kg (7,000 lb), Gillett & Johnston 1926, Meeks & Watson 1996, and Whitechapel 2008
- Nashville, Tennessee: Belmont Tower and Carillon (Belmont University) – 43 bells, heaviest 610 kg (1,340 lb), Gillett & Johnston 1928
- New Haven, Connecticut: The Yale Memorial Carillon in Harkness Tower at Yale University, 1922. 54 bells, by Taylor (originally a chime of 10 bells; additional 44 bells installed 1966).
- New York City: Riverside Church – 74 bells, heaviest 40,000 lb (18,000 kg), Gillett & Johnston 1925 and 1931, Van Bergen 1976, and Whitechapel 2003, moved from Park Avenue in 1929
- Norwood, Massachusetts: Norwood Memorial Municipal Building – 50 bells, heaviest 3,556 kg (7,840 lb), Gillett & Johnston 1928/1935 and John Taylor & Co 1983
- Provo, Utah: Brigham Young University Centennial Carillon Tower – 52 bells, heaviest 4,730 lb (2,150 kg), Petit & Fritsen 1975
- Raleigh, North Carolina: North Carolina State University Memorial Belltower – 55 bells, heaviest c. 1,800 lb (820 kg) B.A. Sunderlin Bellfoundry 2021
- Rochester, Minnesota: Plummer Building (Mayo Clinic) – 56 bells, heaviest 3,556 kg (7,840 lb), Gillett & Johnston 1927–28, Petit & Fritsen 1977, and John Taylor & Co 2006
- Salisbury, Maryland: Brown & Church Carillon, Guerrieri Academic Commons (Salisbury University) - 48 bells, Whitechapel Bell Foundry (London) & Meeks & Watson, 2017
- Santa Barbara, California: Storke Tower (University of California, Santa Barbara) – 61 bells, heaviest c. 5,000 lb (2,300 kg), Petit & Fritsen 1969
- Springfield, Illinois: Thomas Rees Memorial Carillon – 67 bells, heaviest c. 15,000 lb (6,800 kg) Petit & Fritsen 1962 and 2000

== Oceania ==
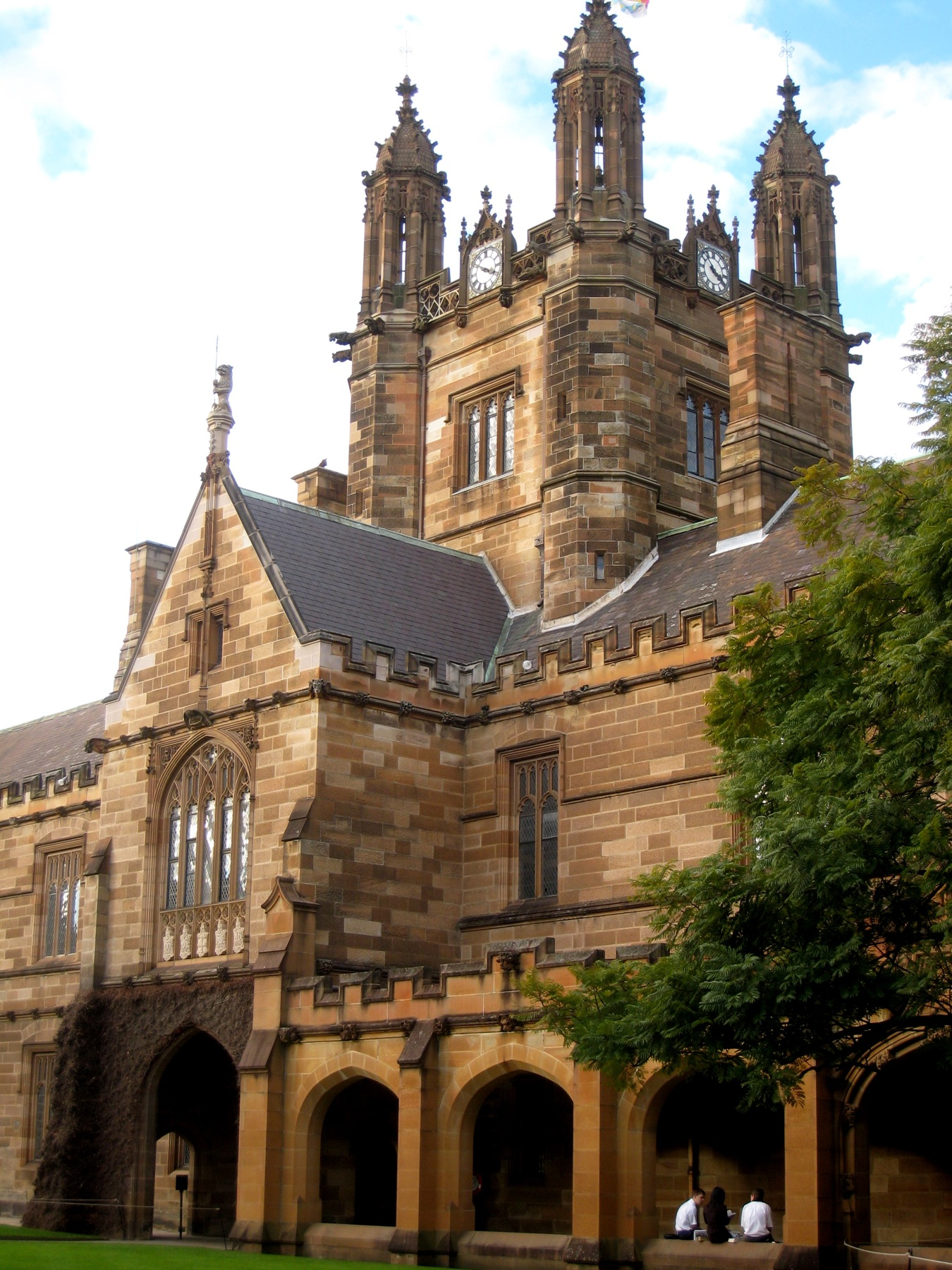
The carillon at the University of Sydney Quadrangle memorialises fallen soldiers of the First World War

Carillons are found in Australia and New Zealand as a result of the First World War. During the German occupation of Belgium, many of the country's carillons were silenced or destroyed. This news circulated among the Allied Powers, who saw it as "the brutal annihilation of a unique democratic music instrument". The destruction was romanticized in poetry and music, particularly in England. Poets – often exaggerating reality – wrote that the Belgian carillons were in mourning and awaited to ring out on the day of the country's liberation. Edward Elgar composed a work for orchestra which includes motifs of bells and a spoken text anticipating the victory of the Belgian people. He later even composed a work specifically for the carillon. Following the war, countries in the Anglosphere built their own carillons to memorialise the lives lost and to promote world peace, including two in Australia and one in New Zealand.

The World Carillon Federation and the Carillon Society of Australia counts carillons throughout Australia and New Zealand. According to the two sources, there are four carillons: three in Australia and one in New Zealand. The largest and heaviest carillon is the National War Memorial Carillon in Wellington, New Zealand, weighing 70,620 kilograms (155,690 lb). The carillons were primarily constructed in the interwar period by the English bellfounders John Taylor & Co, Gillett & Johnston, and Whitechapel. Almost all of the carillons are transposing instruments.

According to the World Carillon Federation, the carillons in Australia and New Zealand account for less than one per cent of the world's total.

== South America ==
=== Brazil ===
- Belo Horizonte: Exact location uncertain – 38 bells, Van Bergen 1959
- São Paulo:
  - São Paulo Cathedral – 61 bells, Petit & Fritsen 1959
  - Vila Formosa Catholic Church – 47 bells, Royal Eijsbouts 1951

=== Suriname ===
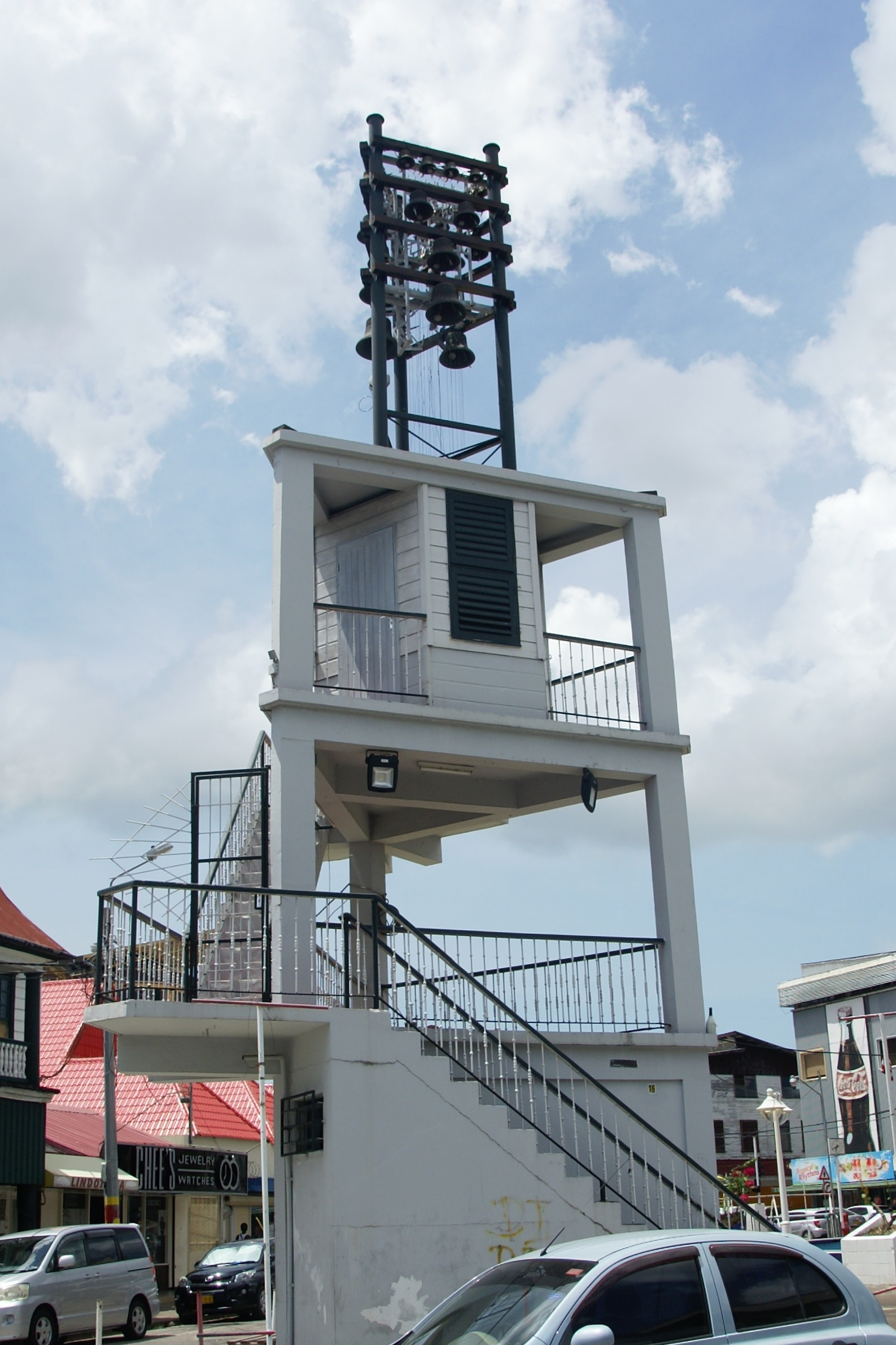
The Vaillantsplein Square Carillon, Paramaribo, Suriname

- Paramaribo: Vaillantsplein Square Carillon – 25 bells, Royal Eijsbouts 1978

=== Uruguay ===
- Alejandro Gallinal: 23 bells, Petit & Fritsen 1962

=== Venezuela ===
- San Cristóbal: Iglesia de Los Recolletos – 23 bells, Petit & Fritsen 1963

== Traveling carillons ==
Traveling or mobile carillons are those which are not housed in a tower. Instead, the bells and keyboard are installed on a frame that allow it to be transported. These carillons are often constructed by bellfounders for advertising purposes, though several exist solely to perform across the world. According to a count by the World Carillon Federation, there are 18 existing mobile carillons headquartered in 11 countries.

- Barcelona, Spain: "Bronzen Piano 'Reverté van Assche'" – 50 bells, 1,951 kg (4,301 lb) total weight, cast by Eijsbouts, completed in 2013, owned by Anna Maria Reverté & Koen van Assche
- Béthune, France: "Carillon Christophe" – 48 bells, unknown total weight, cast by Petit & Fritsen, constructed in 1938 (expanded in 1998), owned by Association Polyphonia
- Constância, Portugal: "Lvsitanvs Carillon" – 63 bells, 6,857 kg (15,117 lb) total weight, cast by Royal Eijsbouts owned by the International Center for the Carillon and the Organ
- Dordrecht, Netherlands: "Bell Moods" – 50 bells, c. 2,000 kg (4,400 lb) total weight, cast by Petit & Fritsen, completed in 2003, owned by Boudewijn Zwart
- Douai, France: "The Walking Carillon of Douai" – 53 bells, 4,045 kg (8,918 lb) total weight, cast by Petit & Fritsen, compleded in 2004, owned by the City of Douai
- Gdańsk, Poland: "Gdańsk" – 48 bells, 4,800 kg (10,600 lb) total weight, cast by Royal Eijsbouts, completed in 2009, fixed on a trailer pulled by MAN 11.168 firetruck
- Løgumkloster, Denmark: "The Transportable Chime" – 50 bells, c. 3,400 kg (7,500 lb) total weight (including the instrument's truck), cast by Petit & Fritsen, owned by the Løgumkloster Church Music School. Includes an additional 54 kg (119 lb) swinging bell
- Maastricht, Netherlands: "Traveling Carillon Frank Steijns" – 43 bells, 1,000 kg (2,200 lb) total weight, cast by Petit & Fritsen, completed in 2006 (replaced in 2011), owned by Frank Steijns
- Mechelen, Belgium: 30 bells, unknown total weight, cast by unknown bellfounder, owned by Our Lady of Hanswijk
- Mons, Belgium: "Carillon Queen Fabiola" – 49 bells, c. 2,800 kg (6,200 lb) total weight, cast by unknown bellfounder, owned by Catiau Montois and Carillons Association
- Nagasaki, Japan: 50 bells, unknown total weight, cast by unknown bellfounder
- Neerpelt, Belgium: The carillon of carillonneur Jan Verheyen from "Bells Lab"
- Osaka, Japan: 37 bells, unknown total weight, cast by unknown bellfounder
- Passau, Germany: "The Mobile Perner-Carillon" – 49 bells, 2,197 kg (4,844 lb) total weight, completed in 2009, cast and owned by Rudolf Perner GmbH & Co.
- Pottstown, Pennsylvania, US
  - "CariBelle" – 35 bells, 1,814 kg (3,999 lb) total weight, cast by Petit & Fritsen, completed in 1980, owned by Frank DellaPenna, originally called "America's Only Traveling Carillon," part of the "Cast in Bronze" band group
  - "DellaPenna Traveling Carillon" – 35 bells, 1,754 kg (3,867 lb) total weight, cast by Petit & Fritsen (originals) and Eijsbouts (enlargement), completed in 1951 (enlarged in 2010), owned by Frank DellaPenns, part of "Cast in Bronze" band group
- Prague, Czech Republic: "The Traveling Carillon of Prague" – 57 bells, 4,950 kg (10,910 lb) total weight, cast by Royal Eijsbouts, completed in 2001
- Ripalta Cremasca, Italy: "Fonderia Allanconi Carillon" – 25 bells
- Rostock, Germany: "Concert Carillon Olaf Sandkuhl" – 37 bells, unknown total weight, cast by Petit & Fritsen, owned by Olaf Sandkuhl

== See also ==
- List of musical instruments
