= Igreja de São Pedro =

Igreja de São Pedro may refer to:

- Igreja de São Pedro (Abragão), a church in Portugal
- Igreja de São Pedro (Leiria), a church in Portugal
