= Exhibition Place Carillon =

Bell instrument in Toronto, Canada

Coordinates: 43°37′55″N 79°25′22″W

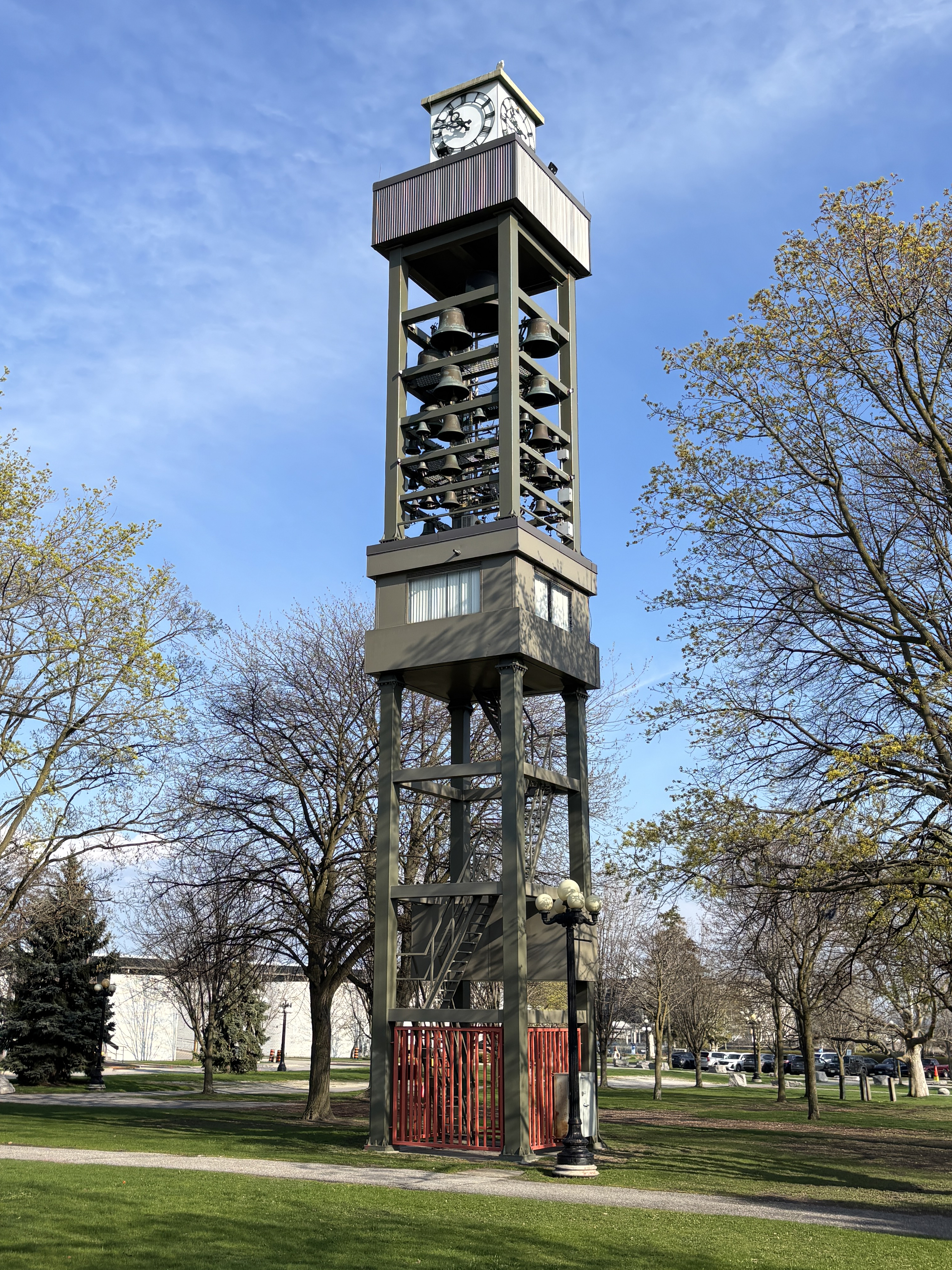
- The Exhibition Place Carillon in 2025
- Interactive map of the Exhibition Place Carillon area

General information
- Architectural style: Beaux-Arts
- Location: Lake Shore Boulevard West
- Year built: 1974
- Renovated: 2001

Height
- Height: 50 metres (160 ft)

The Exhibition Place Carillon (originally the Carlsberg Carillon) is a carillon located at Exhibition Place in Toronto, Ontario, Canada.

== History ==
In 1974, Carling-O'Keefe Breweries provided funding for the construction of the 50-bell carillon. The bells were cast by the Royal Eijsbouts foundry of Asten in the Netherlands. The largest bell (the bourdon) weighs 4800 pounds. The instrument transposes up a perfect fourth from concert pitch. Four of the large bells including the bourdon are equipped with outside hammers to sound the Cambridge Quarters while the bourdon strikes the hour. Part way up the tower is a compartment with figures of the Hans Christian Andersen fairy tale "The Swineherd"; upon activation, these figures could be moved from one side of the tower to the other, but the mechanism is no longer functional. When the carillon was built, it was played most days of the week during the Exhibition summer season. The current carillonist is Gerald Martindale.

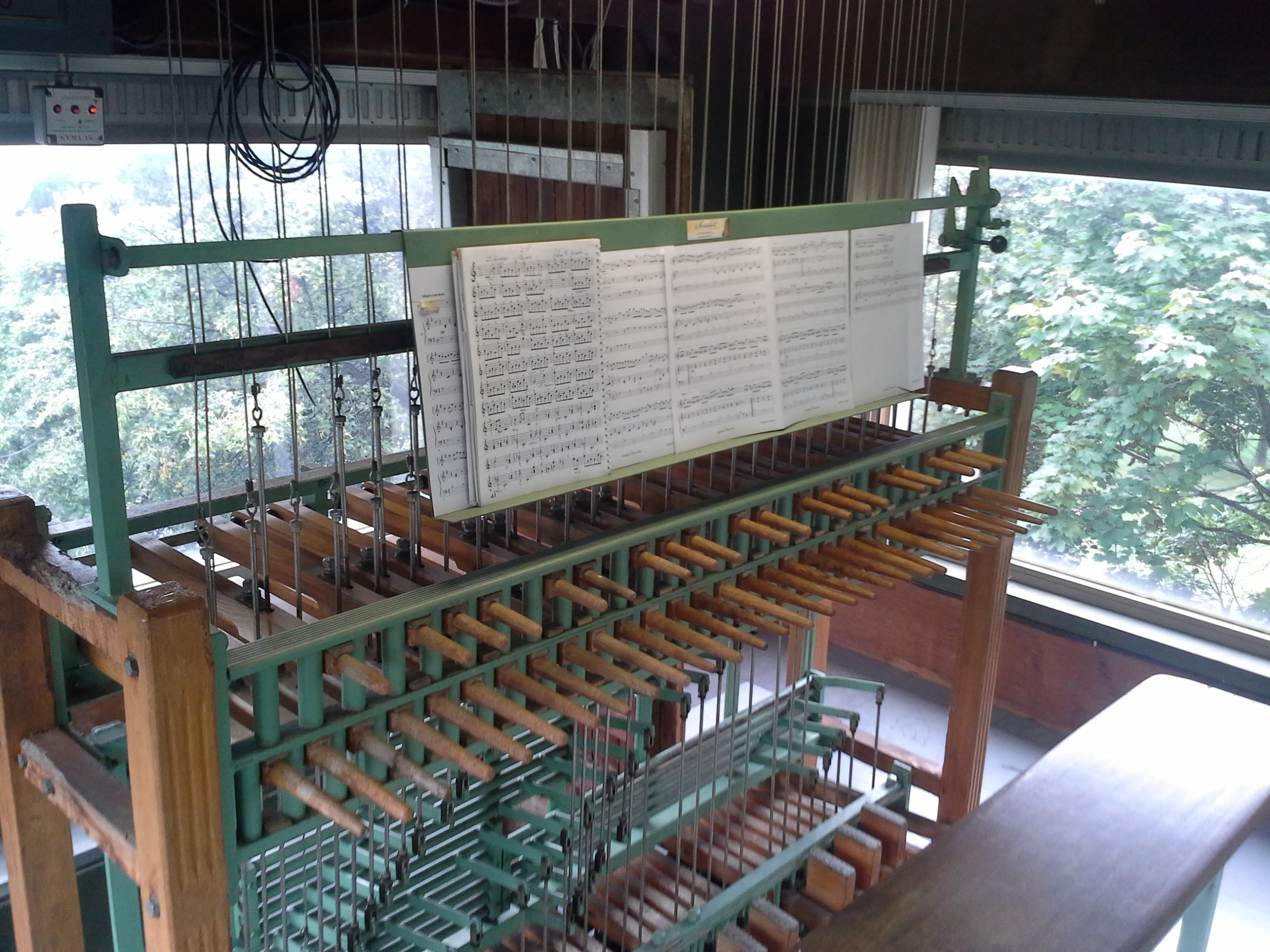
The Exhibition Place Carillon console (manual and pedals) in the playing chamber in 2015

The original plaque reads:

"Carlsberg Carillon presented to the Canadian National Exhibition by Carling O'Keefe Breweries August 1974
Made by Royal Eijsbouts - Holland"

== See also ==
- List of carillons
