= Cook Carillon Tower =

Bell instrument in Allendale, Michigan, US

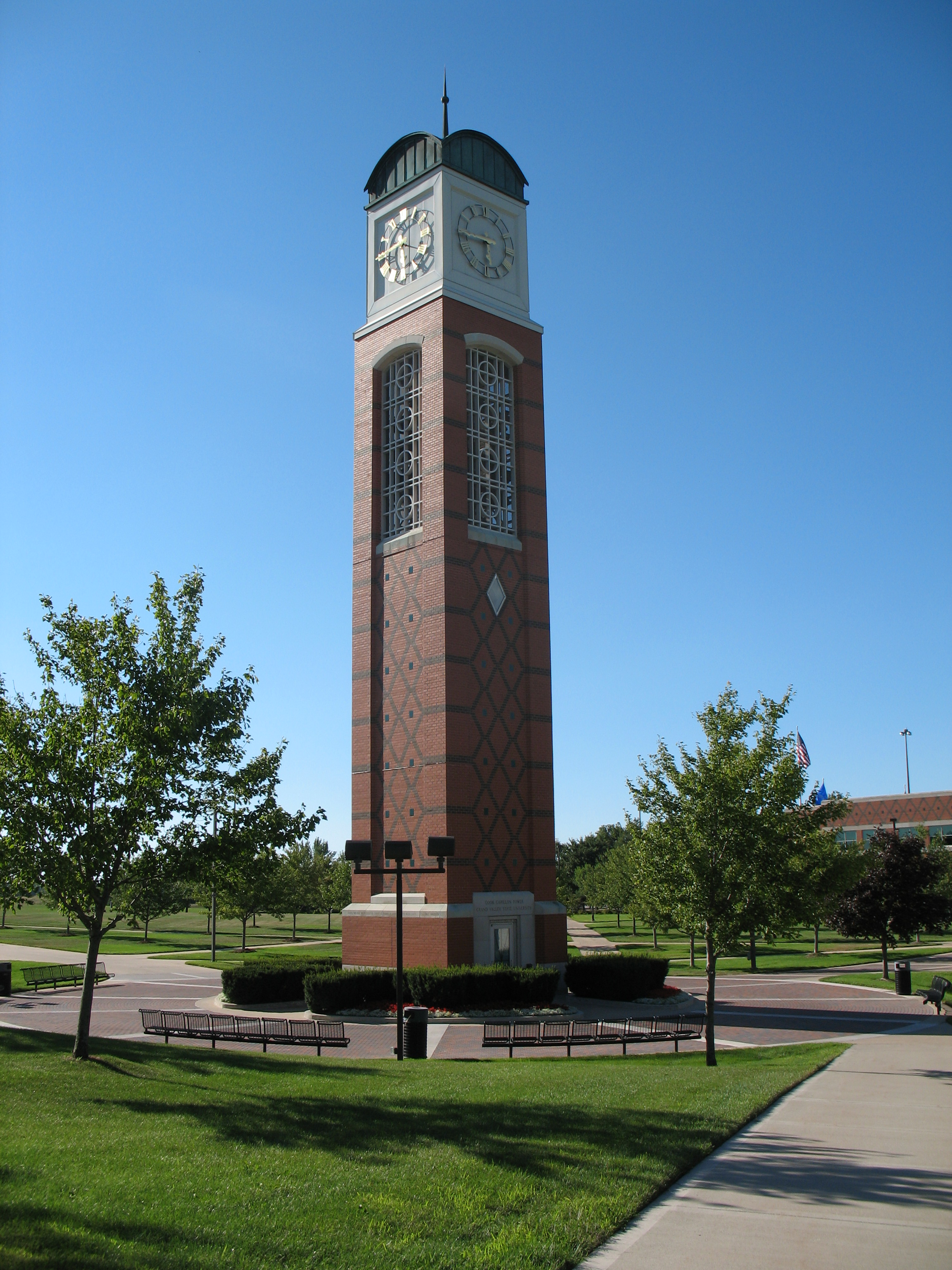
- Cook Carillon Tower at Grand Valley State University-Allendale campus

General information
- Type: Carillon
- Location: Center of Allendale campus Grand Valley State University
- Coordinates: 42.963425°N 85.888595°W
- Named for: Peter C. and Pat Cook
- Completed: 1994

Dimensions
- Other dimensions: 48 bells in carillon

The Cook Carillon Tower is a 10-story-tall carillon-clock tower located in the center of the Grand Valley State University-Allendale campus in Allendale, Michigan. The tower and carillon were built in 1994 with help from generous donations by Peter C. and Pat Cook for which it is named. The tower is considered to be a major icon of both the university and its campus and creates a notable central focal point on the Allendale campus.

The 48 carillon bells are cast of bronze by the Royal Eijsbouts bell foundry and Tower-clock Makers of the Netherlands. The largest bell weighs around 3,000 pounds and the smallest at just 14 pounds with sizes ranging from 51.7 to 7.5 inches. The tower itself is made of brick and stone.

The carillon chimes at every quarter-hour throughout the day on a set computerized play system playing the Whittington chimes. The carillon also automatically plays the university's alma mater, "Hail to Thee, Grand Valley" after the noon chimes. However, the bells are also connected to a keyboard and playing chamber located in the middle of the tower, from which a carillonneur can play.

GVSU also has another carillon, the Beckering Family Carillon Tower, located on the Pew campus in Grand Rapids, Michigan.

== See also ==
- List of carillons in the United States
