= Netherlands Centennial Carillon =

Coordinates: 48.42043°N 123.36848°W

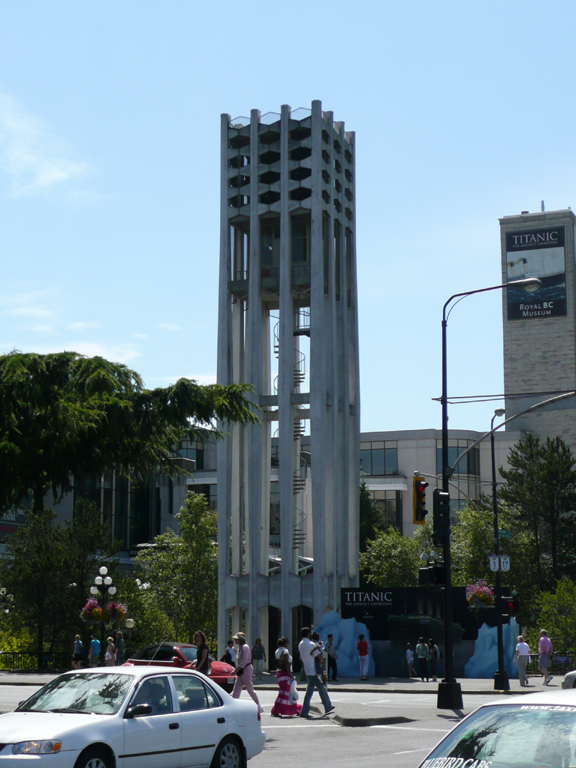
Netherlands Centennial Carillon, Victoria.

The Netherlands Centennial Carillon is a 62-bell carillon located in Victoria, British Columbia, Canada. Its tower is located at the intersection of Government Street and Belleville Street, in front of the Royal British Columbia Museum and across the street from the Parliament Building.

It was given by the Dutch community of British Columbia in thanks for Canada's role in the liberation of the Netherlands during World War II. Queen Juliana of the Netherlands unveiled its cornerstone in 1967, Canada's centennial year. The carillon officially opened in May 1968.

Its first 49 bells were cast at the Royal Bell Foundry by Petit & Fritsen at Aarle-Rixtel, in the Netherlands. Another thirteen were added in 1971.

== See also ==
- List of carillons
