= Petit & Fritsen =

Defunct bell foundry in Aarle-Rixtel, Netherlands

- Industry: Foundry
- Defunct: 2014
- Fate: Acquired by Royal Eijsbouts
- Headquarters: Aarle-Rixtel, Netherlands
- Website: Official website

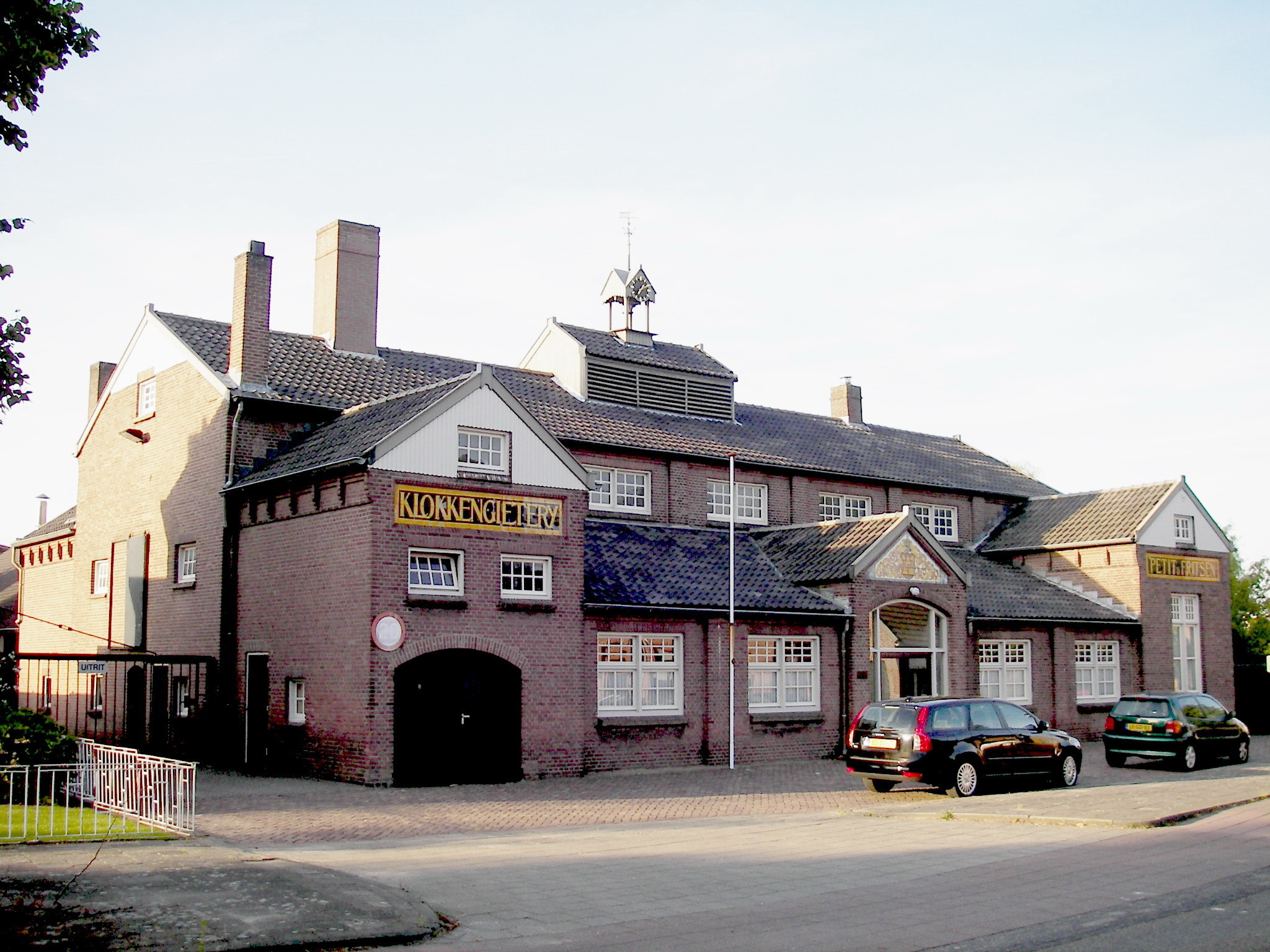
Koninklijke Klokkengieterij Petit & Fritsen b.v. at Aarle-Rixtel

Royal Bellfounders Petit & Fritsen, located in Aarle-Rixtel, the Netherlands, is a former foundry, one of the oldest family-owned businesses in the Netherlands, with the foundry dating back to 1660.

Petit & Fritsen was a foundry that cast bells from tintinnabulous bell metal. The bells could be mounted as individual striking instruments, as for example in a clock tower; could be combined into striking chimes; or could be mounted in complex carillons.

In 2014 Royal Eijsbouts, in Asten, acquired bell foundry Petit & Fritsen, their last Dutch competitor. Foundry activities in Aarle-Rixtel were terminated and re-allocated to Asten.

== See also ==
- Rees Memorial Carillon
- St. Joseph's Church, Semarang
- Freedom Bell, American Legion
- List of oldest companies
