= Igreja de São Pedro (Abragão) =

Church in Abragão, Penafiel, Portugal

Coordinates: 41.1571569°N 8.2221795°W

Igreja de São Pedro is a church in Portugal. It is classified as a National Monument.
