= Igreja de São Pedro (Leiria) =

Chapel in Leiria, Portugal

Coordinates: 39.7472613°N 8.8095805°W

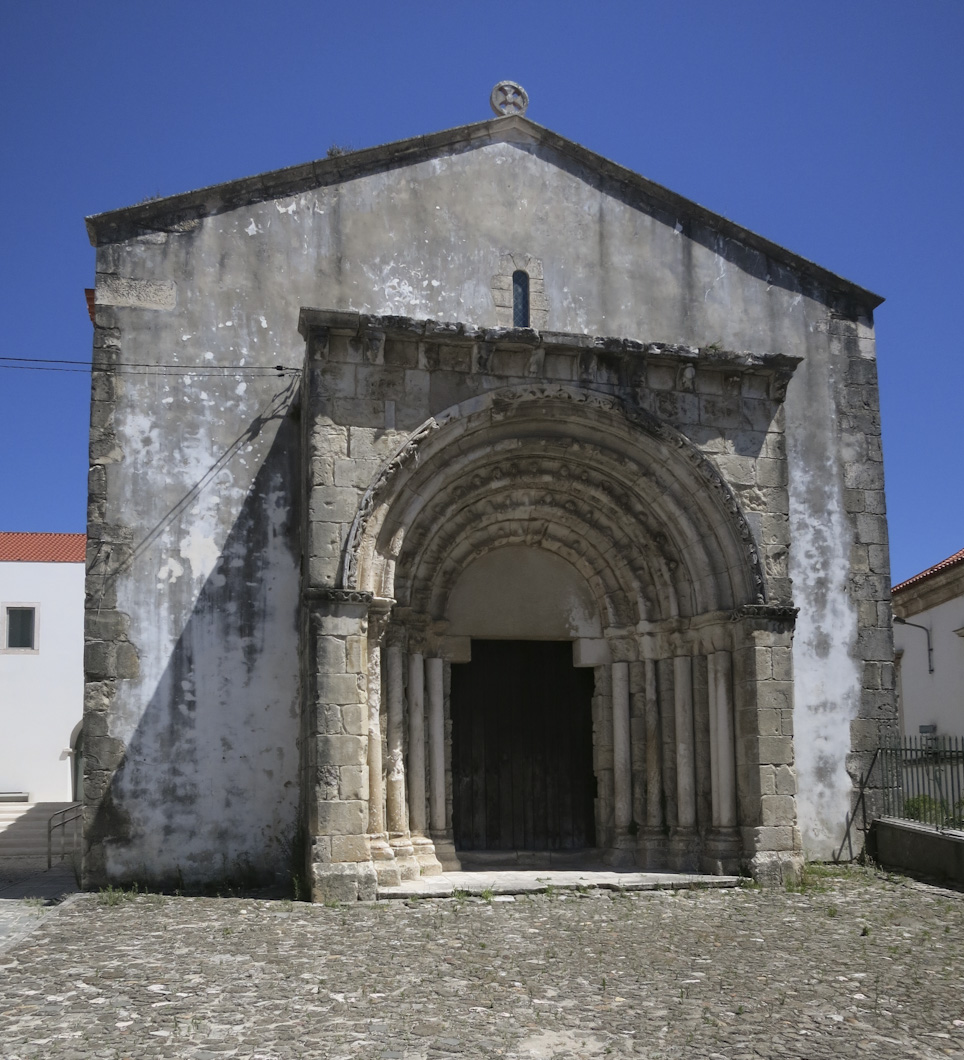
S. Pedro Church, Leiria

Igreja de São Pedro is a church in Portugal. It is classified as a National Monument.

== See also ==
- List of carillons
