= Beckering Family Carillon Tower =

Bell instrument in Grand Rapids, Michigan, US

Beckering Family Carillon Tower (48 bells in the carillon)
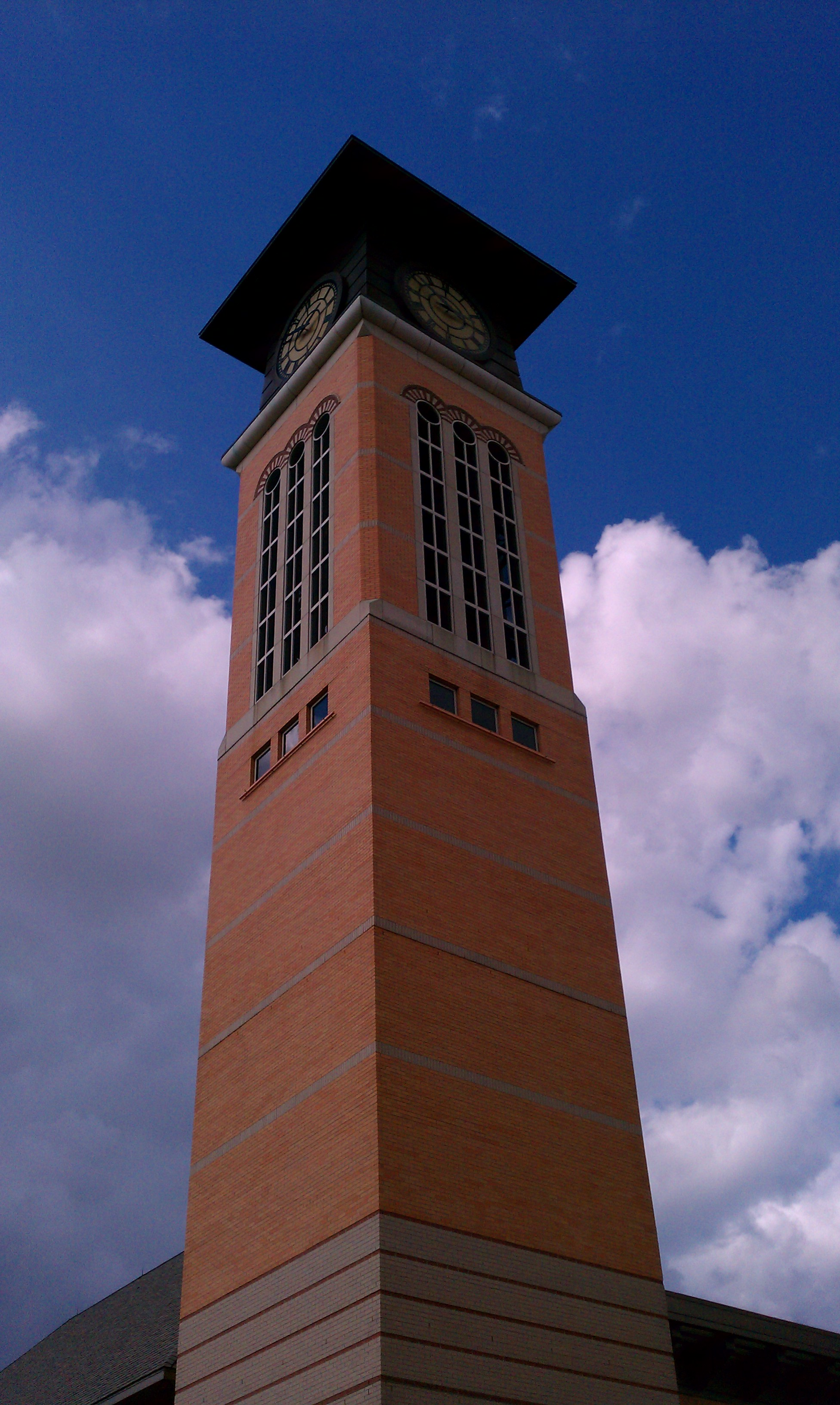
- Beckering Family Carillon Tower at Grand Valley State University-Pew Grand Rapids campus

- Location within Michigan

General information
- Type: Carillon
- Location: Lacks International Plaza at Richard M. DeVos Center, Pew Grand Rapids Campus, Grand Valley State University
- Coordinates: 42.9638°N 85.6804°W
- Completed: 2000

The Beckering Family Carillon Tower is a 151-foot-tall (46 m) carillon-clock tower located in Grand Rapids, Michigan, United States on the Pew Campus of Grand Valley State University. The tower and carillon was funded and built by Pioneer Construction in 2000. The Beckering family, for which the tower is named, established Pioneer Construction in 1933.

The 48 carillon bells are cast of bronze by the Fonderie Paccard in France, who also installed them within the tower.

GVSU also has another carillon, the Cook Carillon Tower, located on the main Allendale campus in Allendale, Michigan.

== See also ==
- List of carillons in the United States
