= Bergholtz Bell Foundry =

Bell foundry in Sigtuna, Sweden

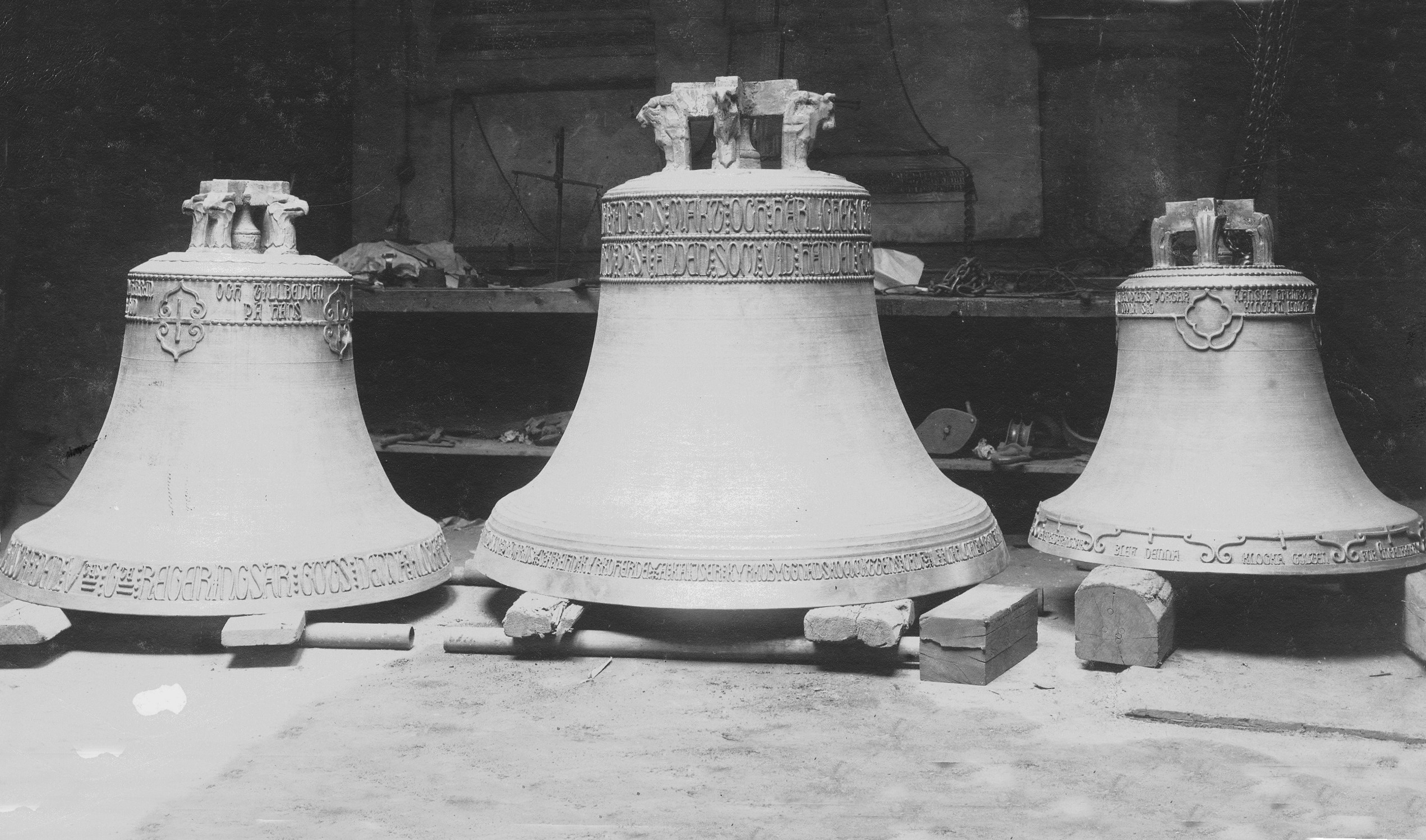
Bells for the Engelbrekt Church, 1913

Bergholtz Klockgjuteri AB is a bell foundry based in Sigtuna, four remaining in Sweden. The other three are Skånska Klock & Konstgjuteriet AB in Hammenhög, M & O Ohlsson in Ystad, and Morells Metallgjuteri in Mora.

== History ==
The foundry was started by the Bergholtz family in 1852, and has been run by several generations of the family: Kristian Bergholtz (1839–1918), Magnus Bergholtz (1882–1974), Gösta Bergholtz (1913–2008), and Bo Bergholtz (born 1947).

== Notable bells ==
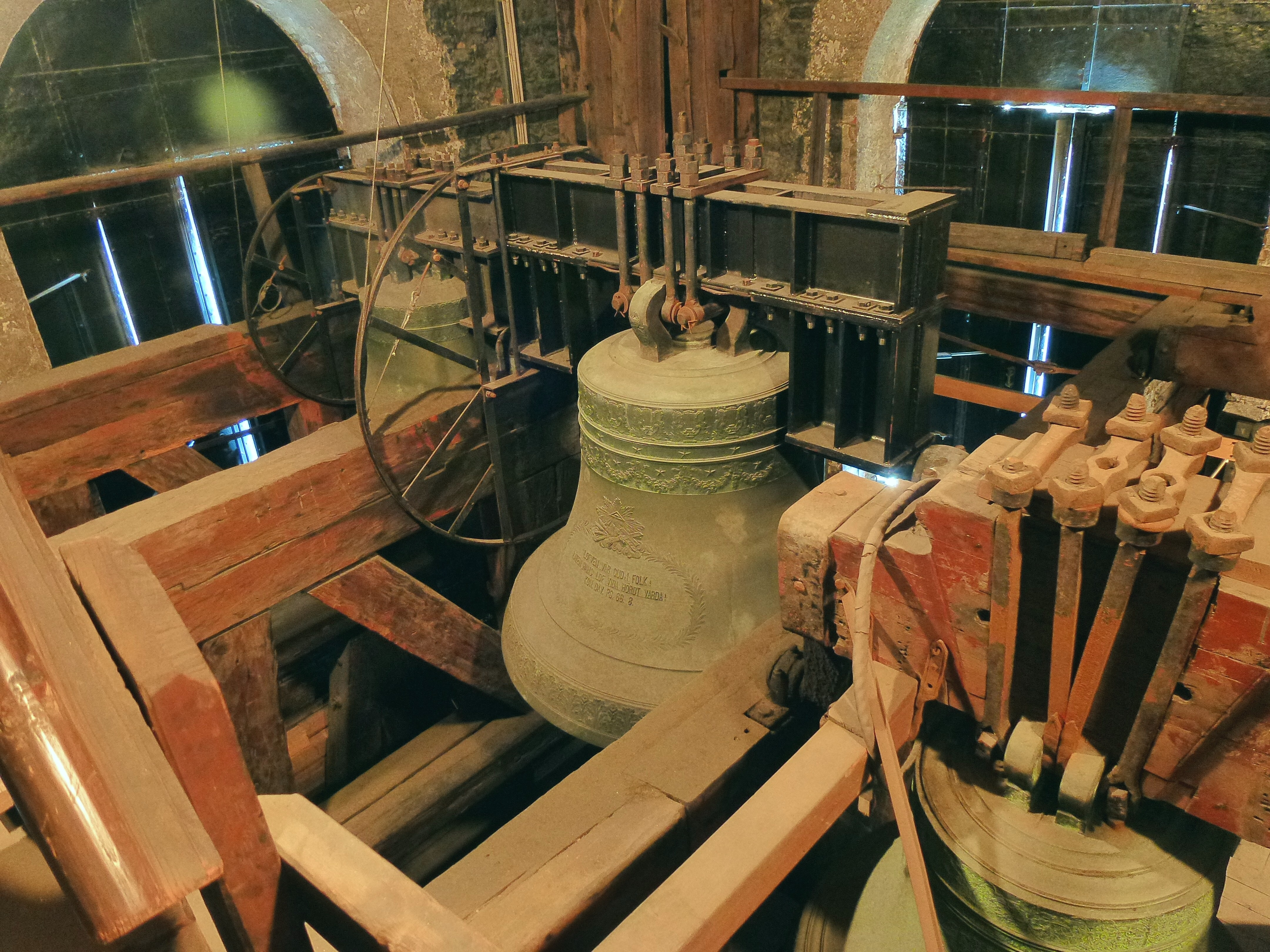
A bell from the Maria Magdalena Church in Stockholm, recast by the foundry

The foundry has specialized in church bells, producing for many churches, including the following:

- Engelbrekt Church (Stockholm)
- Gustaf Vasa Church (Stockholm)
- Hedvig Eleonora Church (Stockholm)
- Karlstad Cathedral (Karlstad)
- Maria Magdalena Church (Stockholm)
- Saint Nicholas Church (Örebro)
