= Royal Eijsbouts bell foundry =

Bell foundry in Asten, Netherlands

- Built: 1872
- Location: Driehoekstraat 3, 5721 AA; Asten, Netherlands
- Coordinates: 51°24′12″N 5°44′35″E
- Industry: Bellfounding
- Products: Bells; carillons; clocks
- Website: Official website

Royal Eijsbouts (Dutch: Koninklijke Eijsbouts) is a bell foundry located in Asten, Netherlands.

== Background ==
The workshop was founded in 1872 by Bonaventura Eijsbouts as a "factory for tower clocks." In 1893 Eijsbouts was joined by his 15-year-old son, Johan, and the workshop expanded to begin supplying striking and swinging bells, which were cast at other foundries, with their clocks.

As interest in carillons increased, Johan Eijsbouts purchased bells from two English foundries, John Taylor Bellfounders and Gillett & Johnston, and installed them in carillons.

In 1924, Johan's oldest son, Tuur Eijsbouts, joined the company. Tuur was technical-minded and inventive. He took the initiative to learn how to cast bells himself. After years of experimentation, an in-house bell foundry was installed in 1947.

The company is still recognized for their cast bells, which are used in carillons and church bells. In 2006 Eijsbouts cast the largest swinging bell in the world.

Royal Eijsbouts has been involved in extensive research programs in campanology (the scientific and musical study of bells) for decades. Those efforts have resulted in computer applications with which all aspects of bell sound and shape can be accurately calculated.

Some applications of this extensive research have resulted in the production of a major tierce bell. This bell shares the identical harmonic structure of a traditional bell, except with an adjusted major third above the fundamental as opposed to a minor third.

Besides bell casting, Royal Eijsbouts also manufactures custom-made tower clocks and astronomical clocks of any size. They also operate an art foundry, using several techniques to cast sculptures and statues.

In 2014 Notre Dame celebrated its 850th anniversary. On this occasion, it was decided to restore the bells of the cathedral to its former glory with a new set of bells. The order was given to the French foundry Cornille-Havard and Royal Eijsbouts in Asten, where the largest bell (Marie) was produced. The casting of Marie took place in Asten on 14 September 2012 in the presence of the bishops of 's-Hertogenbosch, Hasselt and the archbishop of Paris. After inspection, the 6-ton bell was put in a special truck to Paris. Cardinal André Vingt-Trois, archbishop of Paris, dedicated on 2 February 2013, all newly cast bells that were exhibited until 25 February in the cathedral. The day after, the new bells were hung in the belfries. On 23 March, thirty thousand listeners followed the first loud creations the renewed sound of Notre Dame.

Also in 2014 Royal Eijsbouts acquired bell foundry Petit & Fritsen in Aarle-Rixtel, their last Dutch competitor. Foundry activities in Aarle-Rixtel were terminated and re-allocated to Asten.

== Gallery ==
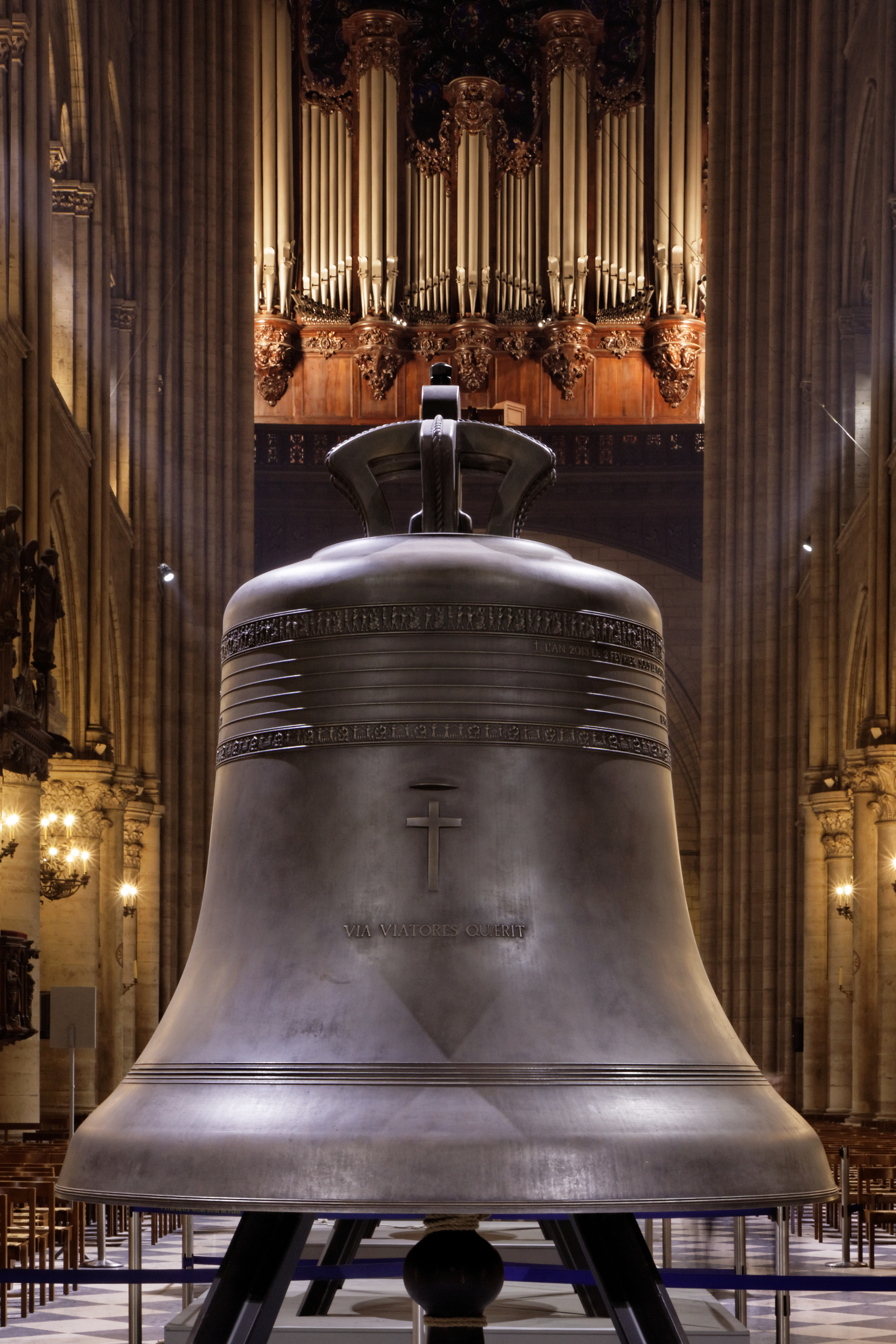
Marie in Notre Dame de Paris in 2013, made by Eijsbouts
