= List of carillons in the United States =

Carillons, musical instruments of bells in the percussion family, are found throughout the United States. Several institutions register and count them. Some registries specialize in counting specific types of carillons. For example, the War Memorial and Peace Carillons registry counts instruments that serve as war memorials or were built in the name of promoting world peace. TowerBells counts carillons played via a baton keyboard as "traditional carillons" and those with computerized or electronic mechanisms as "non-traditional carillons", among other bell instruments. It also publishes maps, technical specifications, and summary statistics. As the World Carillon Federation does not consider non-traditional carillons to be carillons, it counts only those played via a baton keyboard and without computerized or electronic mechanisms. According to TowerBells and the World Carillon Federation, there are about 170 existing traditional carillons in the United States.

According to the World Carillon Federation, the carillons in the United States account for 25 percent of the world's total and is consequently considered one of the "great carillon countries" along with the Netherlands and Belgium.

== Criteria for inclusion ==
The World Carillon Federation defines a carillon as an instrument of at least 23 cast bronze bells hung in fixed suspension, played with a traditional keyboard of batons, and tuned in chromatic order so that they can be sounded harmoniously together. It may designate instruments of 15 to 22 bells built before 1940 as "historical carillons". Its member organizations – including for example The Guild of Carillonneurs in North America – also define a carillon with those restrictions. This list contains only carillons that meet the definition outlined by these organizations.

== Alabama ==
- Birmingham:
  - Rushton Memorial Carillon at Samford University in the Harwell Goodwin Davis Library. 60 bells. Each inscribed with a quote from the Bible or meaningful literary inscription.
  - First Presbyterian, 1924. 37 bells. Originally 25 from the John Taylor Bell Foundry in Loughborough, England. 12 added in 1967 from the van Bergen Bell Foundry.
- Huntsville: First Baptist Church, 1990. 48 bells by The Verdin Company. Carillon housed in the world's tallest prefabricated steeple: 229 ft (70 m). Traditional keyboard + 2 non-traditional electronic consoles.
- Tuscaloosa: Denny Chimes, a well-known landmark of the University of Alabama's campus. Houses 25 bells, which are played both manually and electronically.

== Arizona ==
List of carillons in Arizona
Location	City	Bells	Bourdon weight		Total weight		Range and transposition	Bellfounder(s)	Ref.
Location	City	Bells	lb	kg	lb	kg	Range and transposition	Bellfounder(s)	Ref.
Saint Barnabas on the Desert	Paradise Valley	25	—N/a		—N/a		Up 8 semitones	Royal Eijsbouts 2006	

== California ==
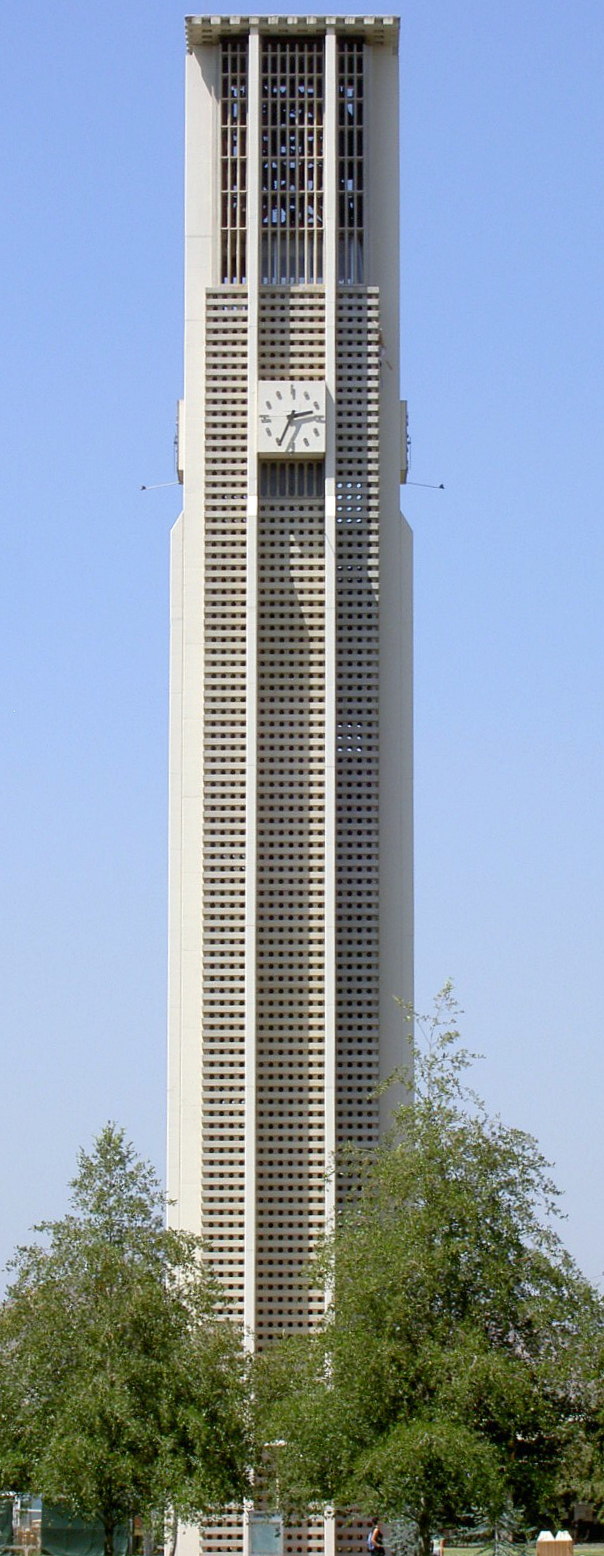
The Carillon Bell tower dominates the University of California, Riverside's main campus.

- Berkeley: The Berkeley Carillon in Sather Tower at University of California, Berkeley, 1917. 61 bells, originally 12 bells (a chime), with an additional 49 bells installed in 1978 and 1983.
- Garden Grove: Christ Cathedral, 50 major-third bells. Royal Eijsbouts, Netherlands.
- Los Angeles: Von Kleinsmid Center Carillon at the University of Southern California, 167-foot tall tower. Completed in 1966 and designed by Edward Durell Stone.
- Riverside:
  - The Mission Inn Hotel & Spa, 1944, designed by G. Stanley Wilson.
  - University of California, Riverside, The carillon and tower were a gift from former University of California regent Philip L. Boyd and his wife Dorothy. The bells range in weight from 5,091 pounds to 28 pounds and are housed in the bell chamber at the top of the 161-foot (49 m) high tower. The dedication of the carillon and tower took place on October 2, 1966.
- San Diego:
  - Hardy Memorial Tower at San Diego State University, built in 1931. Contains the Fletcher Symphonic Carillon (also known as the Fletcher Chimes) (installed 1946), consisting of 204 bells over 6 octaves.
  - Installed in 1946, a carillon was added to Balboa Park's California Building.
- San Jose: Trinity Episcopal Cathedral: Existing 18-bell chime expanded to a 24-bells carillon in a donor-funded project completed in 2017.
- Santa Barbara: Storke Tower (University of California, Santa Barbara) – 61 bells, heaviest c. 5,000 lb (2,300 kg), Petit & Fritsen 1969
- Stanford: Hoover Tower at Stanford University, California. 48 bells, originally 35 bells, with 13 more added in 2002, although only 13 of the original bells remain.

== Colorado ==
- Denver:
  - The Charles S. Hill Memorial Carillon at Johnson & Wales University, 1962. 30 bells. This is also the oldest Carillon in the State of Colorado.
  - The Carl M. Williams Carillon at the University of Denver Ritchie Center, 1999. 65 bells. Made by Royal Eijsbouts, Netherlands
- Westminster: The Bell Tower at Westminster City Hall, 1988. 24 bells, originally 14 bells (a chime), with an additional 10 bells added in 1997.

== Connecticut ==
- Danbury: The Bulkley Memorial Carillon, 1928. 25 bells, Meneely Bell Foundry, 15 bells 1928, 8 added 1928, 2 added 1936, at Saint James' Episcopal Church. Oldest carillon in Connecticut, and the first carillon made in America.
- Hartford: The Plumb Memorial Carillon at the chapel of Trinity College, 1932. 49 bells, expanded from 30 bells in 1974.
- Middletown: in the South College Building at Wesleyan University, 24 bells, mostly from the Netherlands, with the only rosewood console in the world, played by Wesleyan's Bell and Scroll Society.
- New Britain: The Philip B. Stanley Carillon in Robert S. Buol Tower at First Church of Christ, Congregational
- New Canaan: The Dana-Barton Carillon at Saint Mark's Episcopal Church
- New Haven: The Yale Memorial Carillon in Harkness Tower at Yale University, 1922. 54 bells, by Taylor (originally a chime of 10 bells; additional 44 bells installed 1966).
- New Milford: Jose M. Ferrer Memorial Carillon in the Chapel of Our Lady at Canterbury School. Built in 1931 with 23 Gillett & Johnston bells.
- Simsbury: The Foreman Memorial Carillon in Simsbury United Methodist Church, 1986. 55 bells, by Petit & Fritsen.
- Stamford: The Walter N. Maguire Memorial Carillon in Maguire Memorial Tower at First Presbyterian Church
- Storrs: The Austin Cornelius Dunham Memorial Carillon at Storrs Congregational Church
- Wallingford; Seymour St. John Chapel, at Choate Rosemary Hall 10 bell Carillon. Erected 1923, restored in 2005.
- West Hartford: The Gordon Stearns Memorial Carillon at First Church of Christ, Congregational.

== Florida ==
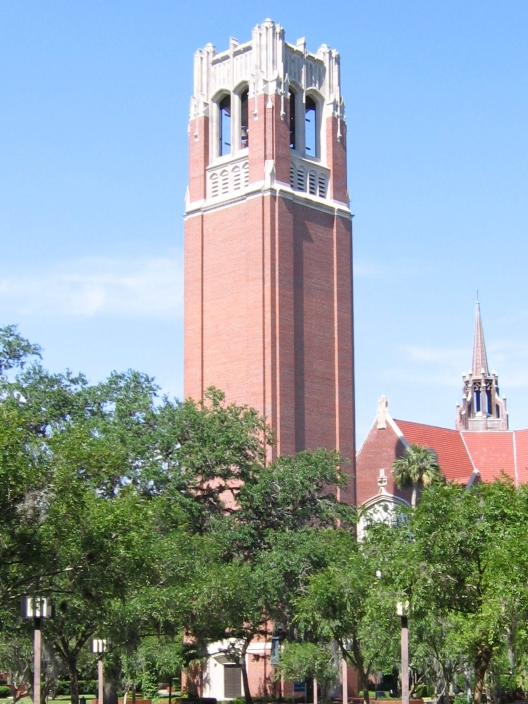
Century Tower. Gainesville, Florida

- Clearwater: The Betty Jane Dimmit Memorial Carillon in the Episcopal Church of the Ascension, 1982. 49 bells by Eijsbouts.
- Gainesville: Century Tower (University of Florida) – 61 bells, heaviest 3,172 kg (6,993 lb), Royal Eijsbouts 1979 and 2003
- Lake Wales: Bok Tower Gardens at Historic Bok Sanctuary, completed 1928. 60 bells, by Taylor, ranging from 16 pounds to 11.5 tons; total bell metal weight 62 tons. Built as the centerpiece to the gardens, which were designed by Frederick Law Olmsted Jr. and funded by editor and philanthropist Edward W. Bok.
- White Springs: The Stephen Foster Memorial Carillon at Stephen Foster Folk Culture Center State Park includes 97 tubular bells from J.C. Deagan Company in 1958. It features the songs of Stephen Foster.

== Illinois ==
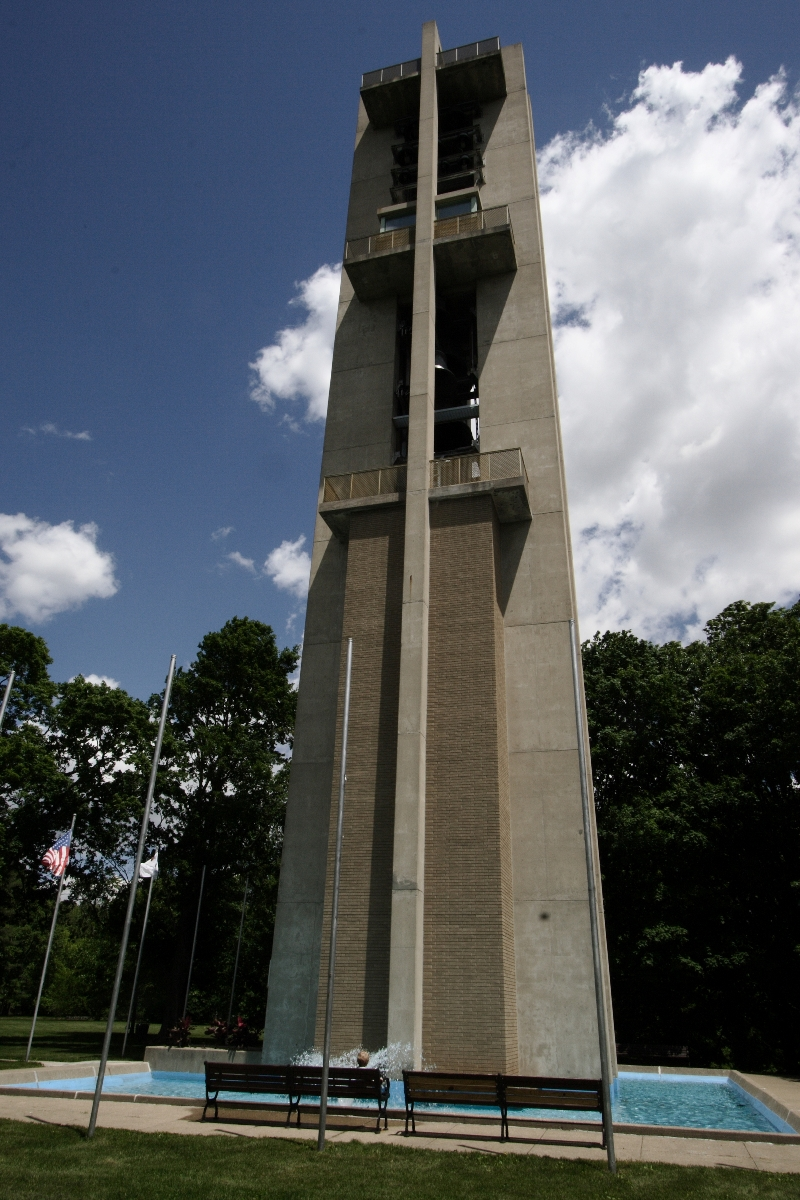
Rees Memorial Carillon Springfield, Illinois

- Centralia: The Centralia Carillon, 1983. 65 bells, ~61,300 lb [27.8 t] (20 / 11,000 lb [9 / 5,000 kg]) by Fonderie Paccard. Currently 8th largest in the world.
- Champaign-Urbana: McFarland Carillon (University of Illinois Urbana-Champaign) – 48 bells.
- Chicago: Rockefeller Chapel (University of Chicago) – 72 bells, heaviest 36,990 pounds (16,780 kg), Gillett & Johnston 1932
- Glencoe: Theodore C. Butz Memorial Carillon on Evening Island, Chicago Botanic Garden, 1986. 48 bells made in the Netherlands.
- Naperville: Moser Tower and Millennium Carillon – 72 bells, heaviest 11,600 lb (5,300 kg), Royal Eijsbouts 2000
- Plainfield: The Plainfield United Methodist Church had a partial carillon until the full 23 bells were finished in 2014.
- Springfield: Thomas Rees Memorial Carillon – 67 bells, heaviest c. 15,000 lb (6,800 kg) Petit & Fritsen 1962 and 2000

== Indiana ==
- Bloomington: The Arthur R. Metz Memorial Carillon of Indiana University. Built in 1970 with 61 bells, tower rebuilt and 4 bells added in 2019. Rededicated as the Metz Bicentennial Grand Carillon in 2020, 65 bells.
- Culver: Memorial Chapel at Culver Military Academy, 51 bells. The Culver Military Academy was the final Gillett & Johnston carillon installation in North America, done in 1951.
- Indianapolis:
  - Arsenal Technical High School. Bell tower of Stuart Hall.
  - The James Irving Holcomb Memorial Carillon Tower on the campus of Butler University.
  - Scottish Rite Cathedral
- Muncie: Shafer Tower on the campus of Ball State University, 2002. 48 bells.
- Notre Dame: Basilica of the Sacred Heart at University of Notre Dame. 23 bells. Oldest Carillon in North America, built in 1865.

== Iowa ==
- Ames: Stanton Memorial Carillon in the Campanile at Iowa State University, 1899. 50 bells by Taylor, originally built with 10 bells in 1899, with 26 more added in 1920, another 13 in 1954, and one final bell in 1967. Renovated in 1994.
- Cedar Falls: University of Northern Iowa Carillon in the Campanile at the University of Northern Iowa, 1926. 56 bells. The carillon originally consisted of 15 bells in 1926 cast by the Meneely Bell Foundry, with 32 bells added in 1968 cast by Petit & Fritsen, and 9 additional bells in 2023 cast by The Verdin Company. The bell tower was renovated in 1984 and 2007.
- Des Moines: The Cathedral Church of St. Paul, Episcopal Cathedral Church of St. Paul | Des Moines, Windsor Memorial Carillon. 25 bells in the Mary Belle Windsor Tower in downtown Des Moines. The 12 original bells were cast in 1896 by the McShane Foundry, Baltimore. Three additional bells were installed in 1989 and 10 more in 1991. These last 13 bells and the rebuild of the bell tower were a gift from the Windsor family, hence, the Windsor Memorial Carillon.

== Kansas ==
List of carillons in Kansas
Location	City	Bells	Bourdon weight		Total weight		Range and transposition	Bellfounder(s)	Ref.
Location	City	Bells	lb	kg	lb	kg	Range and transposition	Bellfounder(s)	Ref.
University of Kansas	Lawrence	53	13,400	6,100	79,000	36,000	Down 1 semitone	John Taylor & Co 1951	

== Kentucky ==
- Berea: Berea College's Phelps-Stokes Chapel Carillon, 1970s 56 bells. It is the largest in the state of Kentucky.
- Covington: Carroll Chimes Bell Tower, 1978, 43 bells, by The Verdin Company.
- Richmond: Eastern Kentucky University's Keen Johnson bell carillon, 1971, 37 bells, by The Verdin Company.

== Louisiana ==
- Morgan City: Carillon Tower at Brownell Memorial Park, dedicated 1971. 106 feet tall with 61 bells.

== Maryland ==
List of carillons in Maryland
Location		City	Bells	Bourdon weight		Total weight		Range and transposition	Bellfounder(s)	Ref.
Location		City	Bells	lb	kg	lb	kg	Range and transposition	Bellfounder(s)	Ref.
	Joseph Dill Baker Memorial Carillon, Baker Park	Frederick	49	—N/a		—N/a		Up 4 semitones	Meneeley 1941; Royal Eijsbouts 1967; Petit & Fritsen 1995	
—N/a	Tagart Memorial Chapel, McDonogh School	Owings Mills	48	—N/a		—N/a		Up 2 semitones	McShane 1898; Petit & Fritsen 1978	
—N/a	Brown & Church Carillon, Salisbury University	Salisbury	48	—N/a		—N/a		None (concert pitch)	Meeks & Watson 2017	

== Massachusetts ==
- Amherst: The Henry Vincent Couper Memorial Carillon at the University of Massachusetts Amherst. It has 42 bells and spans 3 1/2 octaves. Bells cast by the Royal Eijsbouts Bell Foundry of Asten in the Netherlands.
- Cohasset: Erected in 1924 with 23 bells, known as The Bancroft Memorial Carillon. Located in a gothic stone tower in St. Stephen's Episcopal Church. Expanded in 1925, 1928 and then renovated and enlarged to 57 bells between 1989 and 1990 by the John Taylor Bell Foundry. Lowest bell, note G, weighs 11,280 pounds while the smallest bell, note E, weighs 29 pounds.
- Fall River: The Durfee Carillon Bell Tower at BMC Durfee High School, 23 bells, including 9 historic Meneely bells from the first Durfee High School 1880's
- Gloucester: Our Lady of Good Voyage Church.
- Medford: Goddard Chapel Carillon, Tufts University Chaplaincy.
- Northampton: Dorothea Carlile Memorial Carillon, College Hall at Smith College, 47 bells ranging in weight from 24 to 2,800 pounds.
- Northfield: McRoberts Memorial Carillon, Russell Sage Chapel at Northfield Campus, Northfield Mount Hermon School This 55-bell carillon has now been relocated to the Rhodes Arts Center on the Mount Hermon campus in Mount Hermon, MA.
- Norwood: Norwood Memorial Municipal Building – 50 bells, heaviest 3,556 kg (7,840 lb), Gillett & Johnston 1928/1935 and John Taylor & Co 1983
- Wellesley: Wellesley College Carillon at Wellesley College installed in 1931, renovated in 1984, last enlarged in 1990. 32 bells by Taylor.

== Michigan ==
- Allendale: Cook Carillon Tower (Grand Valley State University), 48 bells, heaviest c. 3,000 lb (1,400 kg), Royal Eijsbouts 1994
- Ann Arbor:
  - Burton Memorial Tower (University of Michigan) – 55 bells, heaviest c. 24,000 lb (11,000 kg), John Taylor & Co 1936 and 2011
  - Lurie Tower (University of Michigan) – 60 bells, heaviest c. 12,000 lb (5,400 kg), Royal Eijsbouts 1996
- Big Rapids: Carillon Tower at Ferris State University, 1968.
- Bloomfield Hills:
  - Kirk in the Hills. 77 bells. Second largest carillon in the world in terms of number of bells, tying the one in Daejeon, South Korea.
  - Christ Church Cranbrook. 50 Bells w/ 6,700 lb B-Flat bourdon.
  - St. Hugo of the Hills, 48 bells
- Detroit:
  - Jefferson Avenue Presbyterian Church, 1926. The 23 bells cast by the Gillett & Johnston foundry, have a total weight of 12,096 pounds and are played from a keyboard perched on a wooden platform right below the bell platform. It is the oldest carillon in Michigan.
  - Nancy Brown Peace Carillon – 49-bells, 1940 and 2005
  - The St. Mary of Redford Carillon, 2002. 51 bells cast by Paccard of Annecy, France News: St. Mary's of Redford has a new carillon for a keyboard range of c to d# with the lowest semitone omitted. Additionally, three of the bells (d^{1}, f#^{1}, and a^{1}) are also swinging bells.
- East Lansing: The Beaumont Tower Carillon at Michigan State University, 1928. 49 bells, originally ten bells, thirteen added in 1935, more added in 19__. Renovated by Eijsbouts in 1996.
- Grand Rapids: The Beckering Family Carillon on the Pew Campus of Grand Valley State University.
- Grosse Pointe: Grosse Pointe Memorial Church. 8 bells originally installed in 1927, with 39 bells added in 1952, and 1 more in 2015.
- Houghton: The J. R. Van Pelt Library of Michigan Technological University houses a carillon on the roof, and carillon console in the library.
- Kalamazoo: Former Episcopal Cathedral of Christ the King, 47 bells by Eijbouts.
- Lansing: Christopher Hansen Memorial Carillon, bell tower of the Central Methodist Church. 36 bells.
- Rochester: The Elliott Tower at Oakland University. 49 bells designed and installed by The Verdin Company, cast by Petit & Fritsen.

== Minnesota ==
- Rochester: Plummer Building (Mayo Clinic) – 56 bells, heaviest 3,556 kg (7,840 lb), Gillett & Johnston 1927–28, Petit & Fritsen 1977, and John Taylor & Co 2006
- Saint Paul: House of Hope Presbyterian Church. Four-octave, fully chromatic instrument with 49 bells installed in 1923, 1951, 1959, 1985, and 1991.
- Saint Peter: Christ Chapel (Gustavus Adolphus College) Installed in 1961, destroyed by 1998 tornado. Reinstalled in 2004 by Schulmerich Bells
- Minneapolis, Minnesota: Central Lutheran Church. 47-bell instrument missing low C-sharp and D-sharp. Cast in 2004 and installed in 2005 by Paccard.

== Missouri ==
List of carillons in Missouri
Location		City	Bells	Range and transposition	Bourdon weight		Total weight		Bellfounder(s)	Notes	Ref.
Location		City	Bells	Range and transposition	lb	kg	lb	kg	Bellfounder(s)	Notes	Ref.
	Missouri State University Duane G. Meyer Library	Springfield	48	None (concert pitch)	5,894	2,673	32,000	15,000	Royal Eijsbouts 2002	Jane A. Meyer Carillon; At 140 feet is the tallest freestanding carillon in the Midwest.	
—N/a	Luther Tower; Campus of Concordia Seminary	Clayton	49	None (concert pitch)	5,000	2,300	—N/a		Van Bergen 1970	—N/a	

== Montana ==
List of carillons in Montana
Location	City	Bells	Bourdon weight		Total weight		Range and transposition	Bellfounder(s)	Ref.
Location	City	Bells	lb	kg	lb	kg	Range and transposition	Bellfounder(s)	Ref.
University of Montana	Missoula	47	—N/a		—N/a		Up 5 semitones	Van Bergen 1953	

Danforth Chapel, Montana State University, Bozeman MT. The carillon, a gift of Joseph Mares, class of 1924, plays every morning and evening and on special occasions such as commencement and presidential inaugurations.

== Nebraska ==
List of carillons in Nebraska
Location	City	Bells	Bourdon weight		Total weight		Range and transposition	Bellfounder(s)	Ref.
Location	City	Bells	lb	kg	lb	kg	Range and transposition	Bellfounder(s)	Ref.
First-Plymouth Congregational Church	Lincoln	57	4,592	2,083	—N/a		Up 2 semitones	John Taylor & Co 1931; Whitechapel 1990	
University of Nebraska Omaha	Omaha	47	—N/a		—N/a		None (concert pitch)	Paccard 1988	

== New Hampshire ==
List of carillons in New Hampshire
Location	City	Bells	Bourdon weight		Total weight		Range and transposition	Bellfounder(s)	Ref.
Location	City	Bells	lb	kg	lb	kg	Range and transposition	Bellfounder(s)	Ref.
St. Paul's School	Concord	23	—N/a		—N/a		Up 5 semitones	Gillett & Johnston 1933	

== New Jersey ==
- Morristown: St. Peter's Episcopal Church, 49 bells, heaviest unlisted, John Taylor & Co 1924 and Fonderie Paccard 1952
- Plainfield: Grace Episcopal Church – 47 bells, heaviest unlisted, Gillett & Johnston 1923
- Princeton: Cleveland Tower (Princeton University) – 67 bells, heaviest 12,880 lb (5,840 kg), Gillett & Johnston 1927, Arthur Bigelow 1943, Fonderie Paccard 1966, and Petit & Fritsen 1993
- Rumson: St. George's-by-the-River Episcopal Church – 26 bells, heaviest unlisted, John Taylor & Co 1934

== New York ==
- Albany: Albany City Hall – 49 bells c. 5,080 kg (11,200 lb), John Taylor & Co 1986 and 1989
- Alfred (village): The Davis Memorial Carillon. 47 bells. Erected in 1937.
- New York City: Riverside Church – 74 bells, heaviest 41,000 lb (19,000 kg), Gillett & Johnston 1925 and 1931, Van Bergen 1950s, and Whitechapel 2003, moved from Park Avenue Baptist Church in 1929
- Rochester: The Hopeman Memorial Carillon in Rush Rhees Library at the University of Rochester, 1973. 50 bells by Eijstbouts.
- Williamsville: The Niederlander Carillon at Calvary Episcopal Church, 44 bells. Installed 1959.

== North Carolina ==
- Belmont: The William James Pharr Carillon in the First Presbyterian Church is a traditional carillon of 48 bells. The carillon was installed in 1984 and the bells were cast by the Royal Eijsbouts bell foundry. The smallest bell weighs 31 pounds, and the largest bell weighs 4,850 pounds. The carillon was a gift from Mrs. William James Pharr and is dedicated to the memory of her husband.
- Boiling Springs: The Hollifield Bell Tower at Gardner-Webb University – 48 bells, 1997
- Durham: The Duke Chapel carillon at Duke University – 50 bells by Taylor, 1931–32.
- Gastonia: The Memorial Carillon in First Presbyterian Church – 49 bells, 1973.
- Raleigh: North Carolina State University Memorial Belltower – 55 bells, heaviest c. 1,800 lb (820 kg) B.A. Sunderlin Bellfoundry 2021
- Winston-Salem; Janet Jeffrey Carlile Harris Carillon in Wait Chapel at Wake Forest University, 1978 and 1981. The last carillon cast by Alfred Paccard.

== Ohio ==
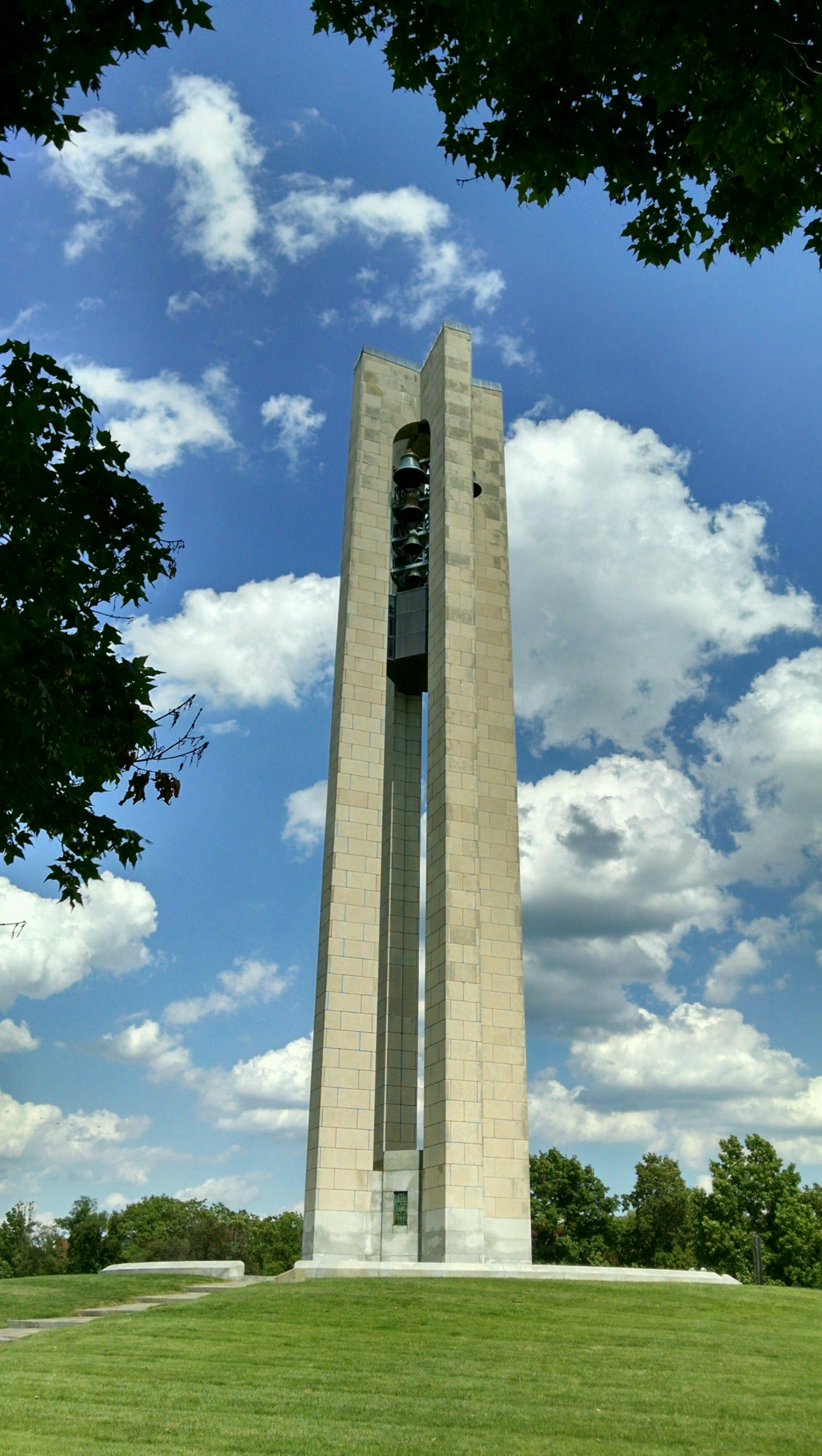
Deeds Carrilon, Ohio

- Cleveland: The Alexander McGaffin Carillon. Installed with 47 bells by Eijsbouts, June 1968. Expanded to 51 bells by Eijsbouts in June 2025.
- Cleveland Heights: St. Paul's Episcopal Church; Erected in 1928 with 8 bells by Gillett and Johnston, 15 bells by Van Bergen were added in 1952, making a carillon of 23 bells. Then, in 2023, an additional 24 bells by the B.A. Sunderlin bellfoundry were added, making a full concert carillon of 47 bells.
- Dayton: Deeds Carillon, Carillon Historical Park, 1942. 57 bells by Petit & Fritsen. Refurbished in 1988 from an electronic to a traditional carillon.
- Mariemont: In Dogwood Park just off of Route 50, in Cincinnati, Ohio. Begun with 23 bells by Gillett and Johnston in 1929, then expanded to 49 bells in 1969 with bells by Petit and Fritsen.
- Oxford: The Pulley Bell Tower at Miami University, constructed 2001. 50 bells designed and installed by The Verdin Company, cast by Petit & Fritsen.
- Wilmington: The Simon Goodman Memorial Carillon at Wilmington College (Ohio) is a 60 foot tower with 35 bells. The bells were cast by Petit and Fristen in Aarle-Rextel, Netherlands. The bells were originally cast for the Brussels World Fair, and were part of the Holy See's Exhibit.

== Oklahoma ==
- Oklahoma City:
  - V.V. Harris Carillon at St. Luke's UMC. 42 bells by Petit & Fritsen.
  - at Westminster Presbyterian Church. 42 bells by Petit & Fritsen.

== Pennsylvania ==
- Bryn Mawr: Bryn Mawr Presbyterian Church tower, 49 bells. Installed May 2006.
- Erie: Floyd and Juanita Smith Carillon at Pennsylvania State University Erie, The Behrend College, 2002. 48 bells, by Meeks, Watson, and Co., ranging from 15.25 pounds to 1,344 pounds.
- Fort Washington: St. Thomas Church, Whitemarsh, Catherine Colt Dickey Memorial Carillon, 1974. 48 bells weighing approximately 18 tons. Bells cast by Dutch foundry, Petit and Fritsen.
- Gettysburg: Gettysburg College has a carillon adjacent to its Quarry Lake.
- Hanover: Sister to the Gettysburg carillon, In the arboretum behind the historic Myers Wareheim Mansion
- Kennett Square: Longwood Gardens, Chimes Tower, 62 bells. The original was by J.C. Deagan Company of Chicago, but the current 62-bell instrument is by Royal Eijsbouts bell foundry. Built by Pierre S. du Pont.
- Kingston: Wyoming Seminary College Preparatory School, founded 1844. "The Bell Tower" was saved from part of Nelson hall, which was mostly destroyed in the Agnes Flood of 1972.
- Lock Haven: The Fredericks Family Carillon at Lock Haven University. 47 bells by van Bergen Bells, 2000
- Mercersburg: Mercersburg Academy – 50 bells, heaviest 3,175 kg (7,000 lb), Gillett & Johnson 1926, Meeks & Watson 1996, and Whitechapel 2008
- New Wilmington: Westminster College The Duff Arrington Memorial Carillon has 42 Bells. Residing in the college's Old Main Tower, it was originally a chime of 12 bells (Meneely). Was expanded in 1978 to 35 bells and again in 2006 to 42 bells (Petit and Fritsen).
- Philadelphia: Church of the Holy Trinity (Episcopal), on Rittenhouse Square, 1883. 25 bells, first with a traditional keyboard in the United States. Restored in 2000.
- Philadelphia: The Miraculous Medal Shrine Carillon, in Germantown, 1901. Built with 26 bells, after renovation in 1952, 47 bells. By Paccard Foundry.
- Philadelphia: Shelmerdine Memorial Carillon at the First United Methodist Church of Germantown, 1901. Built with 48 bells, by John Taylor and Sons Bellfoundry, after renovation in 1990, by Richard Watson and the Verdin Company, 50 bells.
- Pittsburgh: Bell tower of the Allegheny County Courthouse.
- Sharon: St. John's Episcopal Church, 28 bells Eijstbouts foundry Netherlands. Gift of the Mellon family.
- Valley Forge: National Patriots Bell Tower at the Washington Memorial Chapel, 1953. 58 bells, ~57,300 lb [26 t] (13.5 / approx. 8,800 lb [6 / 4,000 kg]), lower 28 by Meneely Bell Foundry and upper 30 by Paccard.

== South Carolina ==
- Charleston: The Carillon and Thomas Dry Howie Tower at The Citadel has 59 bells weighing from 25 to 4,400 pounds and a total of 25,000 pounds, and were originally cast in 1795 at the Bergen Bell foundry in the Netherlands. Installed in 1954, as of 2022 only 18 bells are playable.
- Clemson: The Clemson University Memorial Carillon. 48 handcrafted bells, located in the tower of Tillman Hall at Clemson University.
- Greenville: The Riverplace Bell Tower and Carillon. 25 bells were placed within 3 steel columns, the tallest at 54 feet. The open structure of the tower was designed to view the river and cityscape nearby, under the tower is a continuously flowing water feature. The tower was installed in 2012 and dedicated to C. Thomas Wyche "Tommy" on August 23, 2012. Wyche was chosen for his love of music and lifelong support of the city's arts, land preservation, and future development.
- Greenwood: The Callie Self Memorial Baptist Church Carillon. 37 bells in a 3-octave scale. Bells cast by the Van Bergen Bellfoundries, Heiligerlee, Netherlands. Restored in the 1990s over a one-year period by L. Eckert, a then employee of the foundry's US Office based in Charleston, SC.

== Tennessee ==
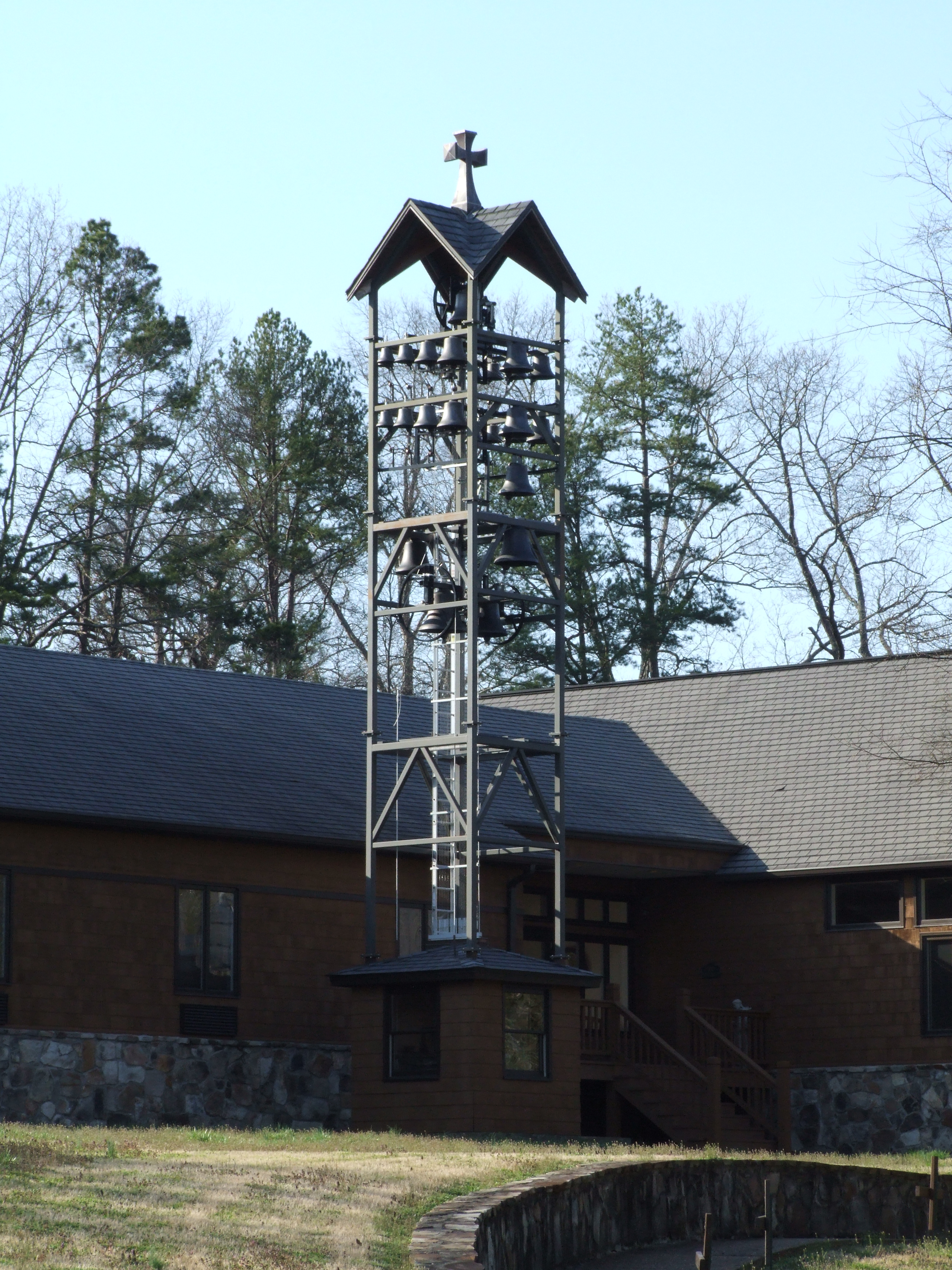
Linnie M. Barger Carillon on the campus of St. Francis of Assisi Episcopal Church, Ooltewah, Tennessee.

- Jackson: Jackson Memorial Carillon, First Presbyterian Church, 47 Paccard bells
- Memphis: The Idlewild Carillon in Idlewild Presbyterian Church. Completed in 1999 and has 48 bells.
- Nashville:
  - Bicentennial Capitol Mall State Park Carillon Pillars – 95 bells (representing the 95 counties in Tennessee)
  - Belmont Tower and Carillon (Belmont University) – 43 bells, heaviest 610 kg (1,340 lb), Gillet & Johnston 1928
  - Allen Bell Tower (Lipscomb University) – 35 bells
- Ooltewah, Tennessee: The Linnie M. Barger Memorial Carillon, designed and cast by Meeks & Watson. 19-bell chime in 2002; tower raised 20 feet, enlarged to 26 bells in 2005-6 and 27 bells in 2012. Unusual open steel framework tower.
- Sewanee: Leonidas Polk Memorial Carillon, All Saints' Chapel, University of the South. 56 bells installed in 1958 by Paccard.

== Texas ==
- Abilene, Texas: Radford Carillon at Radford Memorial Tower on the campus of McMurry University, 1953. 35 bells, made by Petit & Fritsen. A gift of the Radford Estate.
- Austin: Kniker Carillon in the Main Building Tower at the University of Texas. 56 bells.
- Dallas:
  - Porter Memorial Carillon at Highland Park United Methodist Church, 1984. 48 bells, 26 / 5,100 lb [~12 / 2,300 kg] by Paccard.
  - New Bell Tower Carillon, Cathedral Santuario de Guadalupe, 2005, 49 bells.
  - St. Mark's School of Texas, donated by the Roosevelt family.
- Houston: The Bell Tower Center Carillon, 1986. 53 bells, made by Eijsbouts. Based on 47 bells from the Eijsbouts 48-bell traveling carillon that appeared at the 1986 World Carillon Congress in Ann Arbor, Michigan. Upgraded to 53 bells in 1991 by Eijsbouts. Photographs
- Fort Worth: Robert Carr Chapel located on the campus of Texas Christian University is home to "Carillon Americana Bells." A gift from Mrs. and Mrs. Robert G Carr.
- Lubbock: The Baird Memorial Carillon, west bell tower of Administration Building at Texas Tech University, 1976. 43 bells, including bells from Whitechapel, Fonderie Paccard, and Meeks, Watson, and Co. Refurbished in 2004–2005 by Meeks and Watson.
- San Antonio: The Nordan Memorial Carillon at Central Christian Church, 1953. 48 bells (originally 47 and one in 1969), 19 / 3,850 lb [~9 / ~1,750 kg] by Petit & Fritsen.
- Tyler: Dub and B.J. Riter Millennium Carillon Tower, University of Texas at Tyler. 57 bells by Verdin. Completed in 2001.
- Waco:
  - The McLane Carillon in Pat Neff Hall located at Baylor University, dedicated in 1988. 48 bells by Paccard in Annecy, France.
  - The St. Alban's Carillon located at St. Alban's Episcopal Church, installed in 1953. 36 bells by Petit & Fritsen Bell foundry of Aarle-Rixtel in the Netherlands.

== Utah ==
- Provo: Brigham Young University Centennial Carillon Tower – 53 bells, heaviest 6,000 lb (2,700 kg), Petit & Fritsen 1975

== Vermont ==
List of carillons in Vermont
Location		City	Bells	Bourdon weight		Total weight		Range and transposition	Bellfounder(s)	Ref.
Location		City	Bells	lb	kg	lb	kg	Range and transposition	Bellfounder(s)	Ref.
	Middlebury Chapel, Middlebury College	Middlebury	48	—N/a		—N/a		Up 4 semitones	Meneely 1915; Van Bergen/Paccard 1986; Meeks & Watson 2001	
—N/a	Adams Tower, Norwich University	Northfield	47	1,200	540	—N/a		Up 3 semitones	Michiels 1956; Paccard 1959	
	Ira Allen Chapel, University of Vermont	Burlington		—N/a		—N/a		Nearly 4 octaves comprising 40 pitched tuning rods		

== Virginia ==
- Arlington: Netherlands Carillon – 53 bells, heaviest 5,740 kg (12,650 lb), Van Bergen/Petit & Fritsen/Royal Eijsbouts 1954, Royal Eijsbouts 1995 and 2020
- Charlottesville: Christ Episcopal Church, traditional carillon of 23 bells, installed in 1947 with bells made by Gillett & Johnston.
- Luray: The Luray Singing Tower. 47 bells by Taylor, 1937
- Richmond: World War I Memorial Carillon tower, 1932. Built with 66 bells (53 notes). After a 1970s renovation, 53 bells.
- Roanoke: Jessie Ball duPont Chapel, Hollins University, 1959. 47 bells, by Fonderie Paccard.

== Washington (state) ==
List of carillons in Washington (state)
Location		City	Bells	Bourdon weight		Total weight		Range and transposition	Bellfounder(s)	Ref.
Location		City	Bells	lb	kg	lb	kg	Range and transposition	Bellfounder(s)	Ref.
—N/a	Kane Hall, University of Washington	Seattle	47	—N/a		—N/a		Up 7 semitones	Royal Eijsbouts 2017	
	Cathedral of St. John the Evangelist	Spokane	49	—N/a		—N/a		None (concert pitch)	John Taylor & Co 1968	

== Washington, D.C. ==
- Robert A. Taft Memorial and Carillon near the Capitol building, 27 bells by Paccard.
- Campanile of the Knights of Columbus Tower at the Basilica of the National Shrine of the Immaculate Conception, completed 1963. 56 bells by Paccard, gift of the Knights of Columbus to the American Roman Catholic bishops.
- Pelzman Memorial Glockenspiel at the National Zoo, tower includes four moving figures of zoo animals. Traditional carillon of 35 bells by Petit & Fritsen, 1976. Has been relocated on the park grounds, and is presently inoperable.
- Kibbey Carillon at the National Cathedral installed in 1963, is the 3rd heaviest in the world. 53 bells by Taylor.

== West Virginia ==
List of carillons in West Virginia
Location	City	Bells	Bourdon weight		Total weight		Range and transposition	Bellfounder(s)	Ref.
Location	City	Bells	lb	kg	lb	kg	Range and transposition	Bellfounder(s)	Ref.
Concord University	Athens	48	—N/a		—N/a		None (concert pitch)	Paccard 1997	

== Wisconsin ==
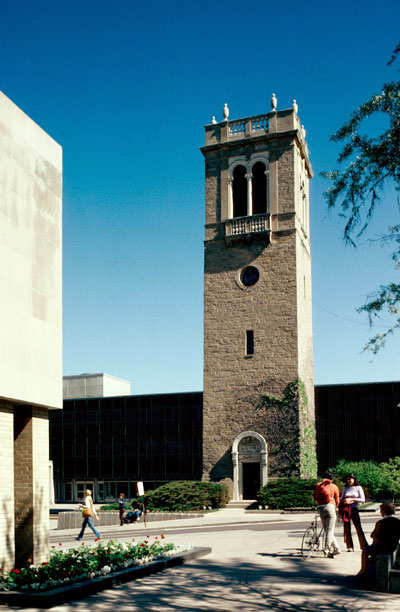
University of Wisconsin–Madison Carillon Tower

- Green Bay: First Ev. Lutheran Church. The gift of and supported by the Kaap Memorial Carillon Fund, and the carillon was dedicated in service on Sunday afternoon, December 22, 1957.
- Madison: Carillon Tower on campus of the University of Wisconsin–Madison, designed under direction of Arthur Peabody, (1934), 56 bells.
- Milwaukee: Marquette Hall at Marquette University
- Monona: Tower of Memories at Roselawn Memorial Park, built in 1936. Neogothic revival style. Deagan

== See also ==
- Index of campanology articles
