= Belmont Tower and Carillon =

Bell instrument in Nashville, Tennessee, US

Belmont Bell Tower
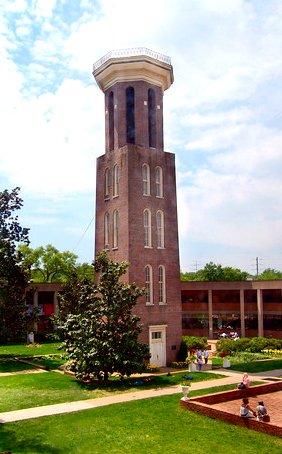
- The bell tower located on the campus of Belmont University Tower 2014 Nashville, Tennessee
- Interactive map of the Belmont Bell Tower area
- Former names: Water Tower, Singing Tower, Alumnae Chimes, Belmont Tower

General information
- Type: Renovated Tower
- Location: Nashville, Tennessee, USA
- Coordinates: 36.133389°N 86.795097°W
- Construction started: 1850
- Completed: 1853
- Owner: Belmont University

Height
- Height: 105 ft (32 m)

Technical details
- Structural system: Brick, Wood Frame
- Floor count: 5

Design and construction
- Architect: Adolphus Heiman

References
- Belmont
- U.S. National Register of Historic Places
- NRHP reference No.: 71000816
- Added to NRHP: May 6, 1971

The Belmont Tower and Carillon is an iconic structure on the campus of Belmont University in Nashville, Tennessee. The Tower is listed in the National Register of Historic Places as part of the Belmont Mansion registration and is prominently featured in the university logo. The current Belmont University Tower and Carillon chimes each hour from 9:00am–8:00pm.

== Description ==
The Belmont University Tower and Carillon is located approximately 528 ft (161 m) south of the Belmont Mansion on Belmont University's campus in Nashville, Tennessee.

Located on the former summer estate of Colonel Joseph and Adelicia Acklen, the tower was constructed circa 1850 to be used as a water tower for the Belmont Mansion and gardens. In 1864 during the Battle of Nashville union troops led by General T.J. Wood used the structure as a signal tower.

When a carillon of twenty-three bronze bells was installed at Ward-Belmont College in 1928, it became the first carillon in Tennessee and one of the first twenty-five carillons in North America. The original carillon bells were exchanged for an electronic carillon in 1951, shortly after the property became Belmont College.

In 1986, a second carillon of twenty-three bells was installed. A gift of nineteen more bells was given to Belmont University by The Massey Foundation and other beneficiaries and installed in November 2002 by Meeks, Watson and Company. The addition of a low D-sharp bell completed the carillon in 2005. The largest bell weighs 1,188 pounds, and the smallest bell weighs twenty-two pounds. The total combined weight of the forty-three bells amounts to 7,477 pounds. The bells were cast by royal bellfounders Petit and Fritsen, in Aarle-Rixtel, Netherlands and installed by the I.T. Verdin Company of Cincinnati, Ohio.

The Tower currently houses a total of forty-three bells and is one of only six carillons in the state of Tennessee. The present carillon is played by Dr. Richard Shadinger, Professor of Music in Belmont University's School of Music.

== Design ==
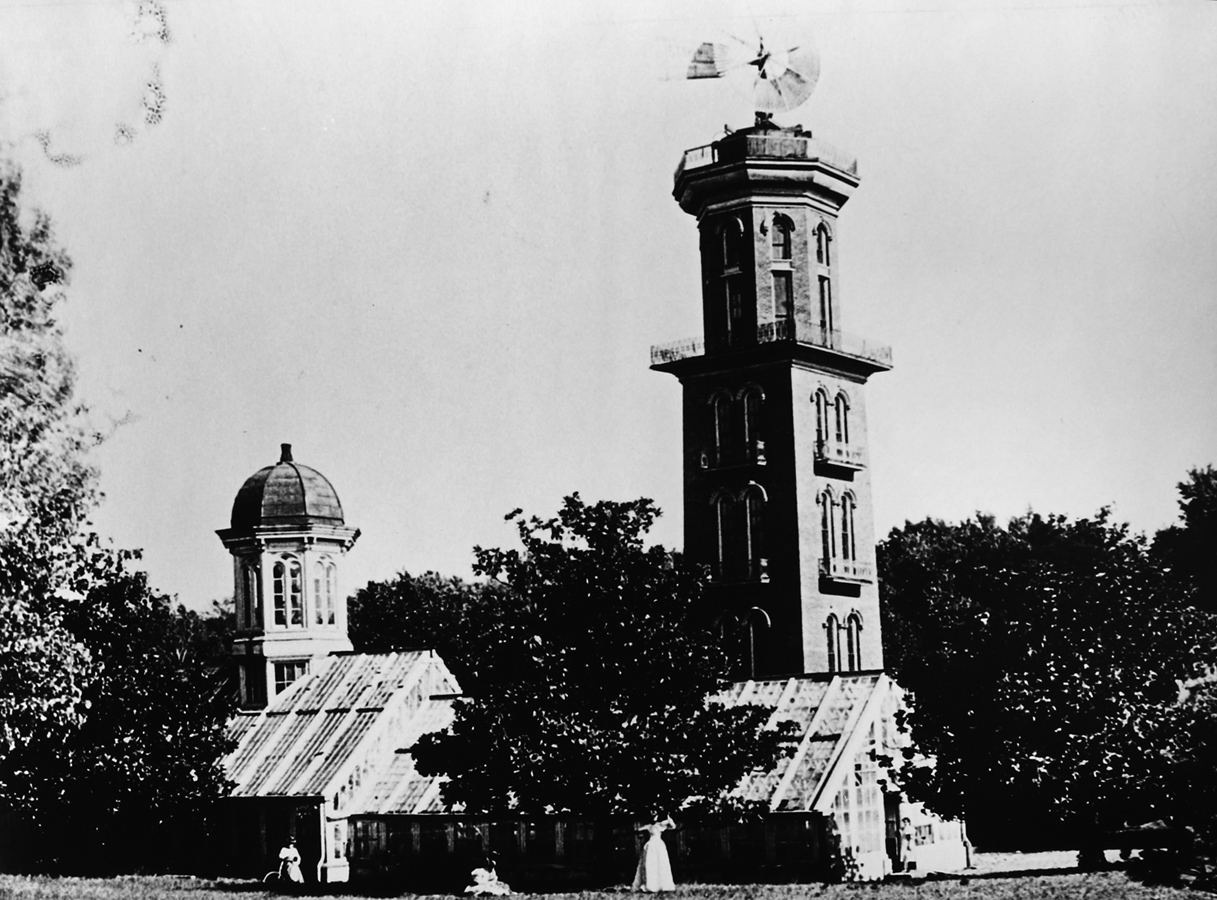
Belmont Water Tower circa 1900 with adjacent greenhouse.

Design of the tower is credited to famed architect Adolphus Heiman with lesser mention of William Strickland. The tower design is based on the Lighthouse at Alexandria, one of the seven wonders of the ancient world, and it is the largest surviving antebellum water tower constructed for private use in the United States. The brick water tower stands 105 feet tall and was originally surrounded by a moat and bridge at the entrance.

Inside the five-story tower lies an original cast-iron staircase leading to the second floor of the tower. The staircase is an exact replica of the staircase in the Green-Meldrim House in Savannah, Georgia. The first floor of the tower was renovated into a prayer chapel in 1974, which is currently open to visitors day and night. The second floor houses the music library. The third floor holds a practice carillon. The fourth floor houses the keyboard control mechanism for the carillon bells.

The bronze bells are located behind screens on the fifth level of the tower.

== History of the tower and carillon structure ==
- 1853 - The construction of the water tower was completed on the 650-acre estate of Colonel Joseph Acklen and his wife, Adelicia Acklen.
- 1856 - The tower served as the estate irrigation system and an observatory.
- 1928 - A twenty-three bell carillon, Alumnae Chimes was installed in the tower on the Ward-Belmont school campus. This year was the first year the tower served as a carillon.
- April 12, 1929 - The Alumnae Chimes were formally dedicated with a recital by Percival Price, carillonneur of Canada.
- May 1952 – Belmont College exchanged the original cast bells for an electronic instrument from Schulmerich Electronics, Inc. The bells were transported to Sellersville, PA. and installed on Carillon Hill.
- 1974 - The first floor of the tower was converted to a Prayer Chapel.
- December 20, 1985 - Belmont College signed a contract with the I.T. Verdin Company for twenty-three new cast bells, a forty-three noted playing keyboard, and an automatic play for fourteen bells: $115,464. New bells were cast by Petit and Fritsen from Aarle-Rixtel, Netherlands and installed by I.T. Verdin.
- 1986 - The twenty-three new bells were installed in the tower. Three of these bells have inscriptions honoring former Belmont College President, Herbert C. Gabhart and his wife.
- April 12, 1992 – A practice keyboard was installed on the third floor of the tower.
- November 2002 - Nineteen bells were added to the carillon, bringing the total collection to forty-two bells.
- November 2005 - The addition of a D-sharp bell completed the collection of forty-three bells.
- August 2010 - The university invested $400,000 to renovate the tower.
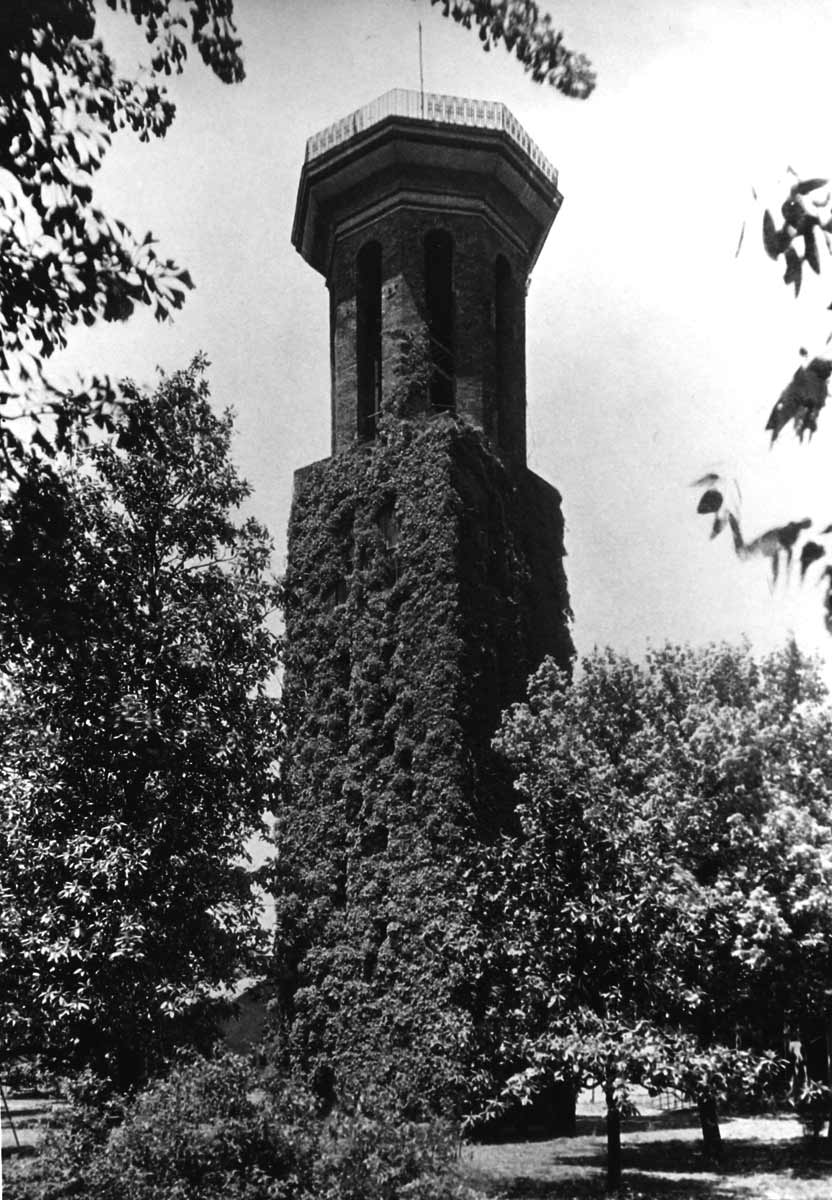
1

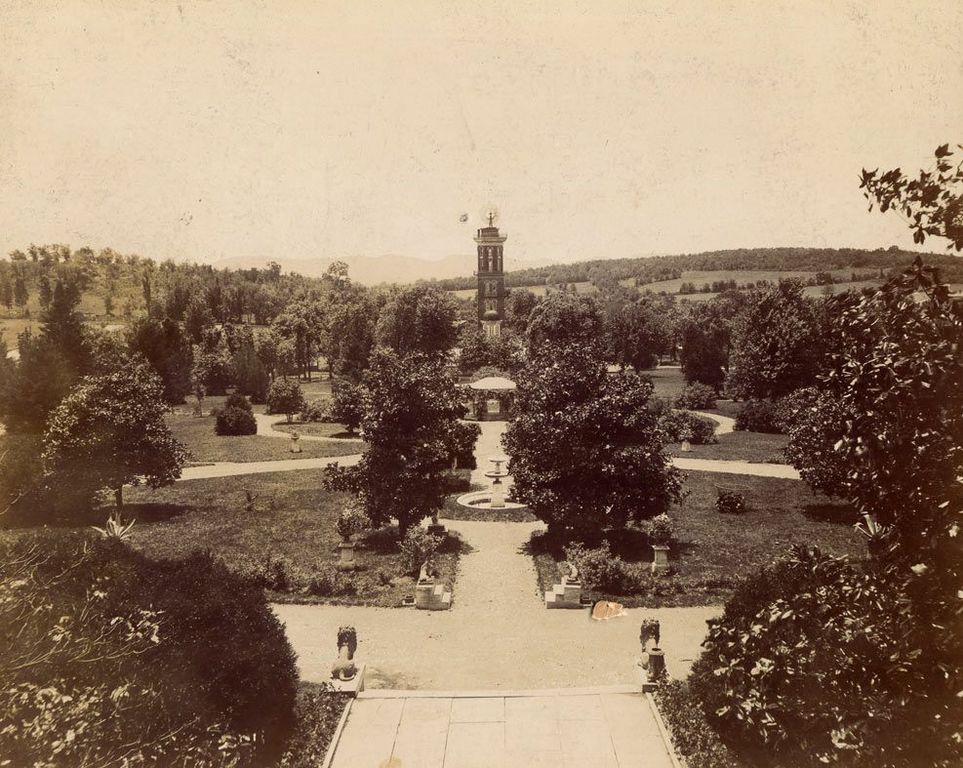
2

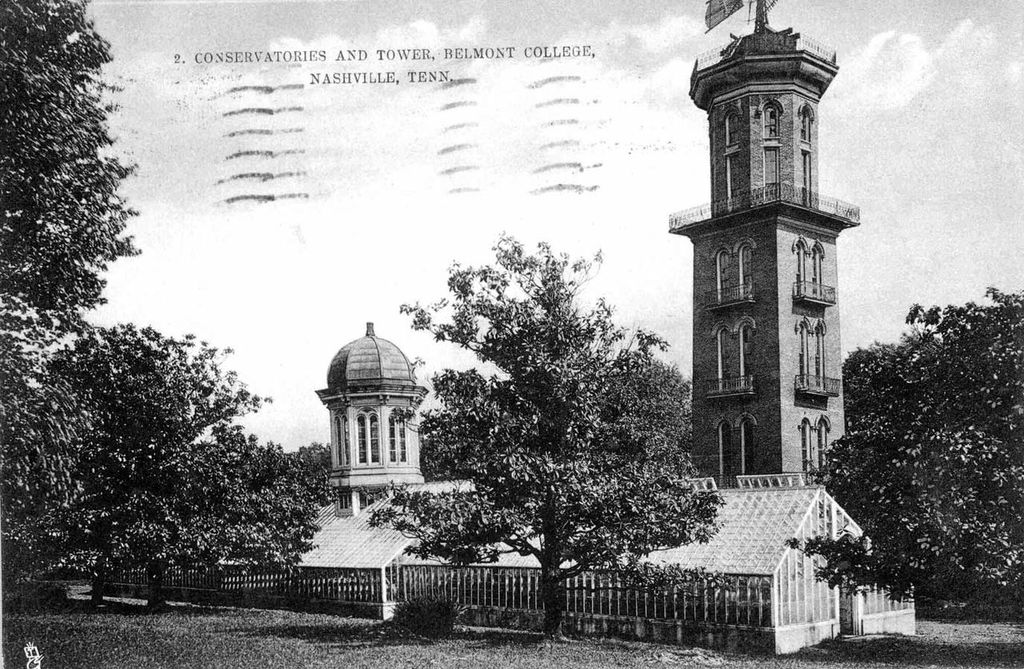
3

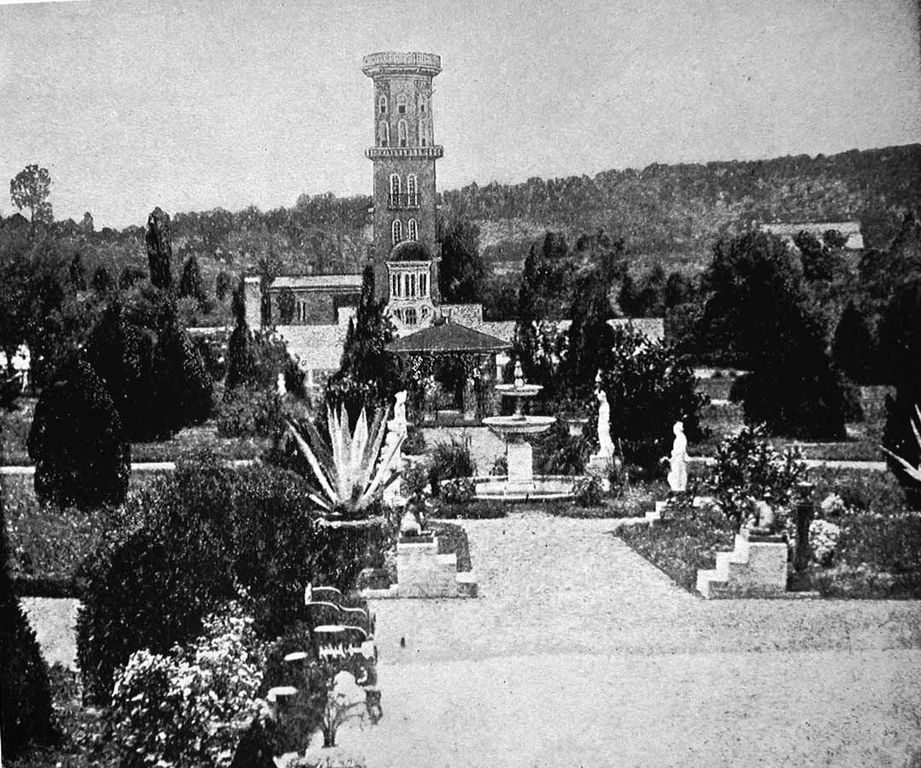
4

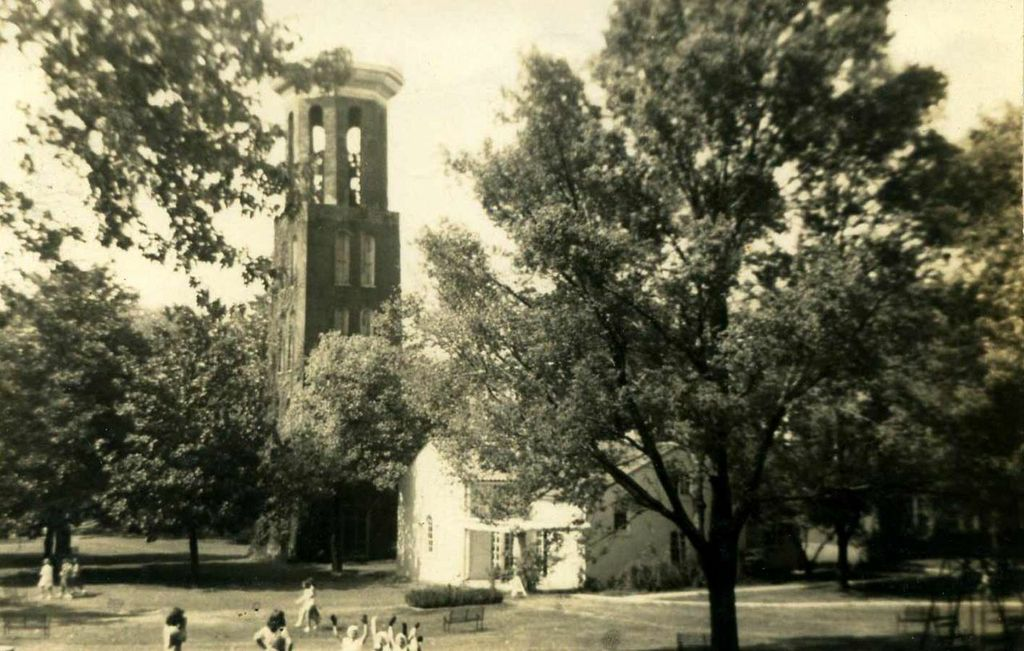
5

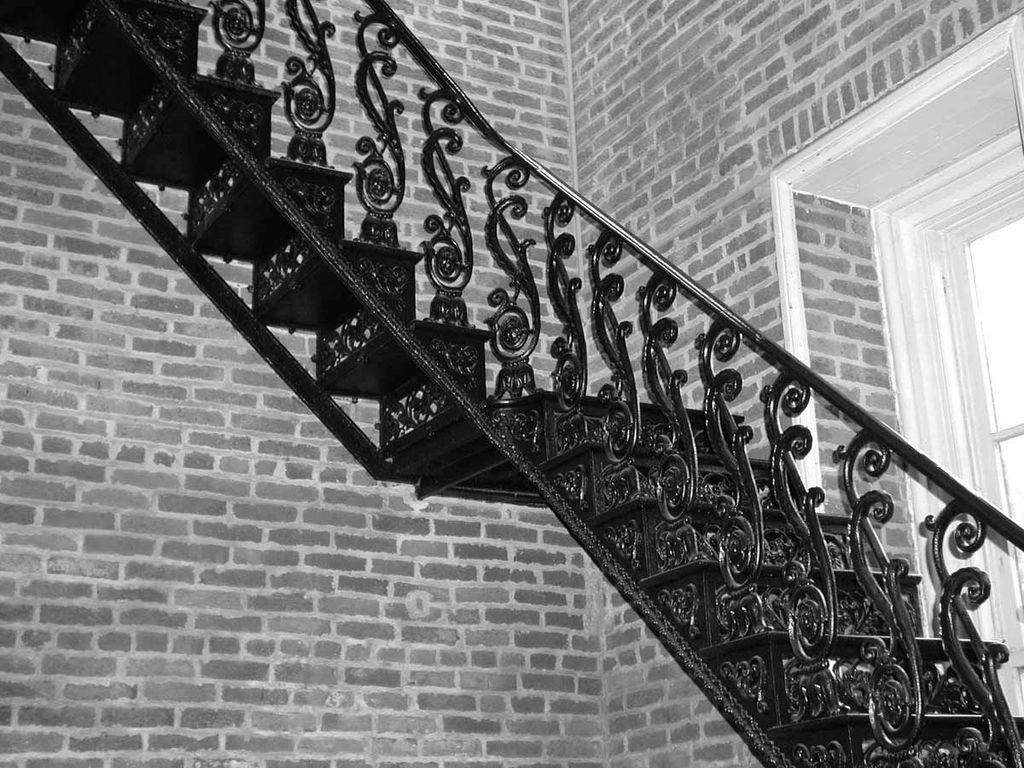
6

== Notable events ==
Belmont Tower 2008 - Belmont University, Presidential Town Hall Debate Site

- December 1864 - While Union 4th Corps troops of the U.S. Army of the Cumberland occupied the Belmont Mansion during the Battle of Nashville, the water tower served as a Federal signal station. At 2:30pm on December 1, 1864, Confederate troops were seen approaching within about a mile and a half of the line running south of the tower.
- November 21, 1928 – First performance of the original Ward-Belmont College bells ("Alumnae Chimes") – Henry S. Wesson, organist for Ward-Belmont College and Director of the Department of Theoretical Music.
- November 17, 1934 – Frederick Arthur Henkel played "Hail to the Chief” on the Carillon as president and Mrs. Franklin Delano Roosevelt and the presidential party approached the Ward-Belmont campus.
- November 1, 1974 – The Belmont College Tower was dedicated and converted to a Prayer Chapel with funds provided by Mr. and Mrs. Charles G. Hitner.
- September 5, 1986 – Following the installation of twenty-three new bells, the first public carillon performance at Belmont College was performed by Mr. Richard Watson.
- Fall 1992 – Carillon was offered as a course for credit at Belmont University. Laura Snyder was the first student to participate in the course offering.
- October 7, 2008 - Belmont hosted the 2008 Town Hall Presidential Debate between Senator Barack Obama and Senator John McCain. On Flag Day, the university draped a forty-five feet tall x sixteen feet wide banner to publicize the upcoming event. The Tower would prove to be a symbolic backdrop for the debate since it stood through thirty-one presidencies.
- Christmas Eve Carillon Concert - This tradition features traditional music played on the tower's forty-three bell carillon every Christmas Eve. The tradition originated during the Ward-Belmont days.

== See also ==
- List of carillons in the United States
