= Olinger Tower =

Colorado Women's College

Coordinates: 39°44′44″N 104°54′25″W

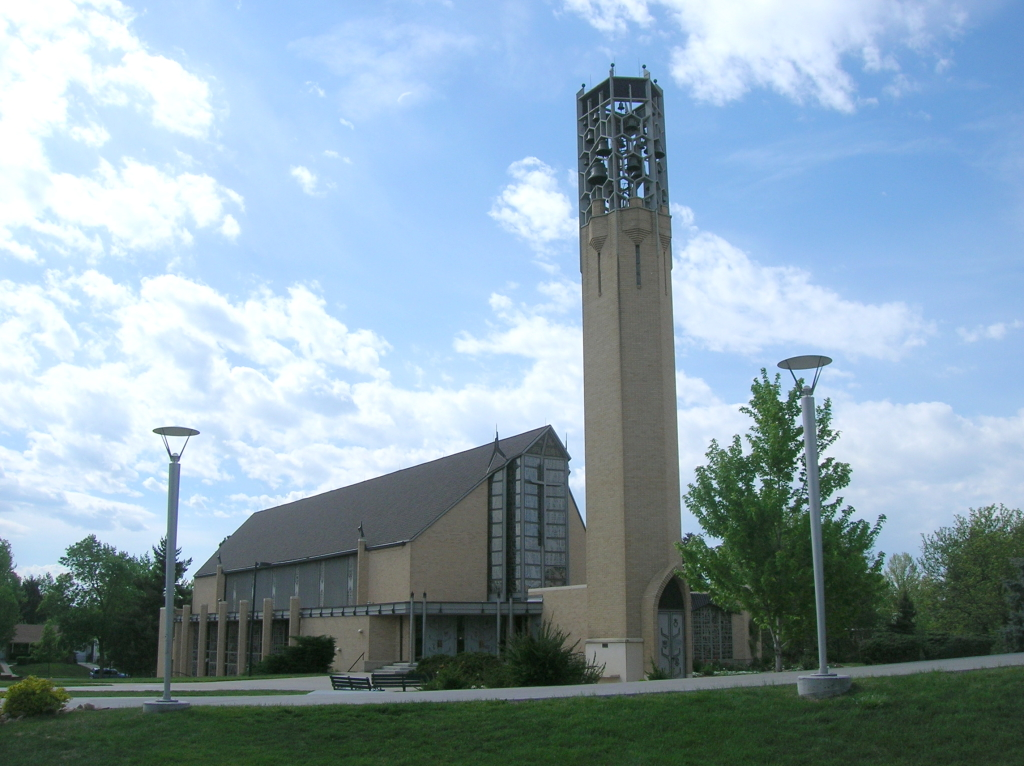
Olinger Tower

The 72-foot Olinger Tower contains the Charles S. Hill Memorial Carillon, the oldest authentic carillon in Colorado. From 1961 through 1999, the Hill Carillon was the only manually played carillon in Colorado.

== Overview ==
The George W. Olinger Memorial Tower is a pentagon-shaped, blond brick campanile adjacent to the Whatley Chapel on the former Colorado Women's College campus in the Park Hill neighborhood of Denver. The bells are visible from the ground in the tower's crown-like stone lattice lantern, which was designed by Denver architect Stanley Morse and made by William G. Zimmerman. The carillon was donated by Colorado Women's College trustee Mrs. Virginia S. Hill to the school in memory of her husband and erected on the tower in August 1961.

Pieces arranged for the chapel and tower's Public Service of Dedication include Prayer for Peace, composed by Jean Miller, and an arrangement of Georg Philipp Telemann's Fantasia in G minor by University of Chicago carillonneur Daniel Robins.

Every school day from 1962 through 1980, Colorado Women's College music professor Phyllis Tremmel or her students played the Hill carillon at noon and at 5 pm, as well as prior to special events at the college.

== Carillon ==
The 30-bell Charles S. Hill Memorial Carillon was cast by the Royal van Bergen Bellfoundries, Heiligerlee, Netherlands. The thirty bells weigh 4,754 pounds. The largest bell is three feet in diameter and weighs 924 pounds. The smallest bell is eight inches in diameter, weighing 18 pounds. Delicate in tone, the instrument is played manually with fists and feet from the clavier which is located at the top of the tower.

The installation of the bells was unique in that the bells were placed in the lantern while it was on the ground and then the entire crown was lifted into place at the top of the tower.

== See also ==
- List of carillons in the United States
