= The Verdin Company =

American bell foundry and clock maker

Coordinates: 39°06′35″N 84°30′24″W

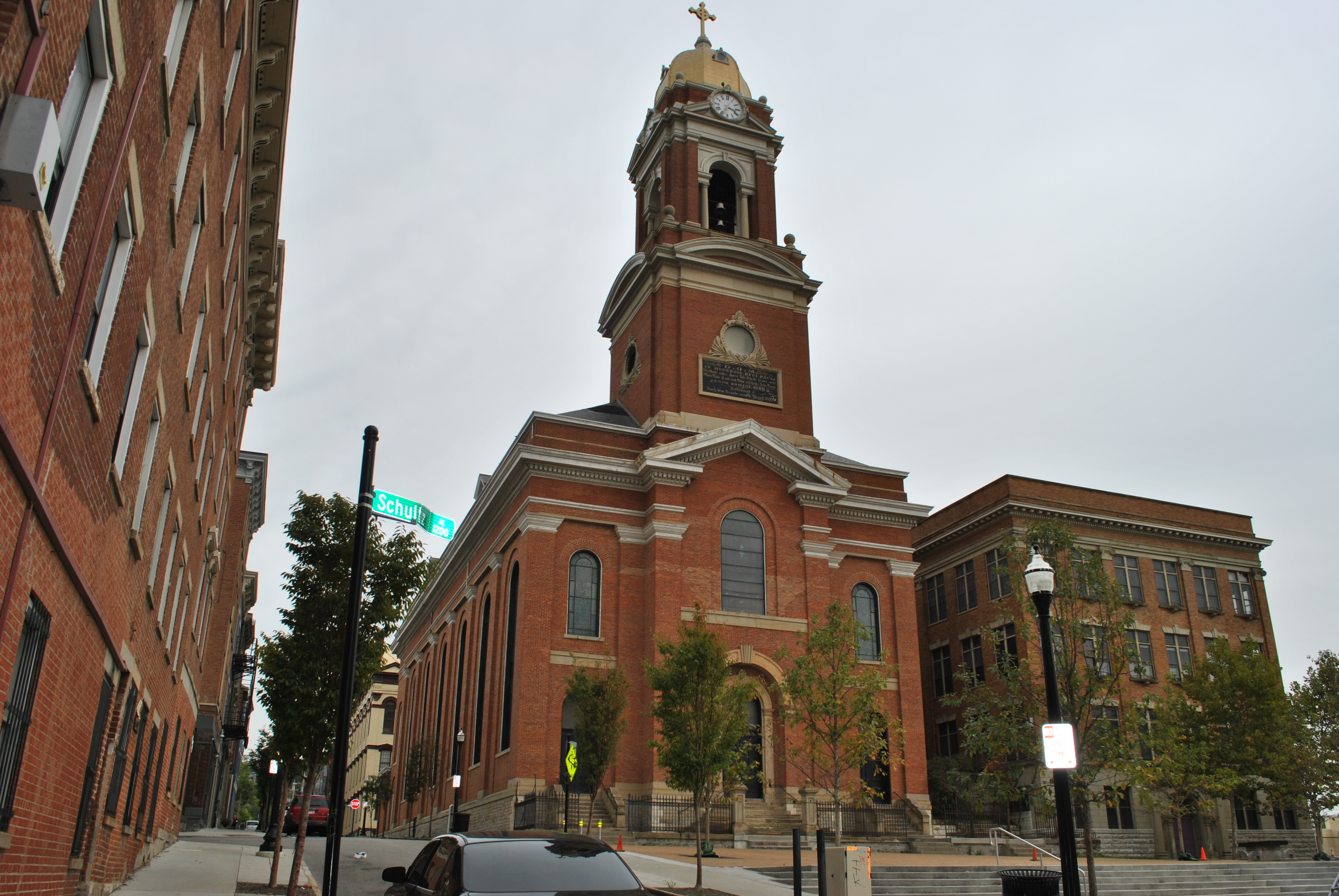
- St. Paul's Church, part of the Bell Event Centre at the Verdin Company headquarters
- Industry: Bellfounding
- Founded: 1842; 183 years ago
- Headquarters: Cincinnati, Ohio, United States
- Key people: Bob Verdin (CEO)
- Website: verdin.com

The Verdin Company is a manufacturer of bronze bells, clocks and towers based in Cincinnati, Ohio in the United States. The company has been making, restoring, and repairing bells for use in bell and clock towers, peals, chimes, and carillons since 1842. The company also manufactures electronic carillons, street clocks, glockenspiels, and monuments. There is now an organ division serving churches and other institutions combining organ and bell music.

The Verdin Company is headquartered in an historic five-building church complex in the Over the Rhine neighborhood in Cincinnati, formerly occupied by St. Paul Church. The complex and church were restored in 1983 and now include the Bell Event Centre.

== History ==
The Verdin Company began in 1842 when brothers Francis de Sales and Michael Verdin installed the first tower clock in the United States at Old St. Mary's Church in Cincinnati, Ohio.

The Verdin Company has been a family business for six generations. Bob Verdin, a member of the sixth generation, is currently the company's CEO.

In 2001 the company received a contract from the state of Ohio to cast a bell for each county in the state to celebrate the state's 2003 bicentennial. The bells were cast in a trailer-mounted foundry, the only mobile bell foundry in the world. Prior to that time the company had not generally cast its own bells, instead contracting with the Dutch foundry Petit & Fritsen.

The company's pipe organ division was created in 2016.

The former church complex that now serves as the company's headquarters was begun in 1848 as St. Paul's Church, the seventh German Catholic church in Cincinnati. It was heavily remodeled by Samuel Hannaford after a fire in 1899. The building was deconsecrated in 1975 and acquired by the Verdin Company in 1981.

== Notable installations and inventions ==
=== Inventions ===
In 1927, the Verdin Company built the first electric bell ringer in America and replaced manually operated bells in the 1930s and 1940s with electrification.

=== Installations ===
The World Peace Bell in Newport, Kentucky, United States (33,285 kg / 73,381 lbs. with a width of 12 feet / 3.7 m); it was cast in 1999 under Verdin's direction by the Paccard Foundry near Annecy, France. Other notable installations include the Basilica of the National Shrine of the Immaculate Conception, the Smithsonian Institution, the Canadian Parliament Buildings and Walt Disney World Resort, and the 88 bronze bells cast for the Ohio Bicentennial.

Verdin Company also crafted a 24-inch brass bell for the Seaport Shrine in Boston.

In 2015, Verdin finished the construction of a 19x6ft Big-like foot piano (32 keys, 32 bells) installed at Smale Riverfront Park in Cincinnati.

== See also ==
- Bellfounding and clock making
