= Duane G. Meyer Library =

Coordinates: 37°11′57″N 93°16′52″W

Duane G. Meyer LIbrary
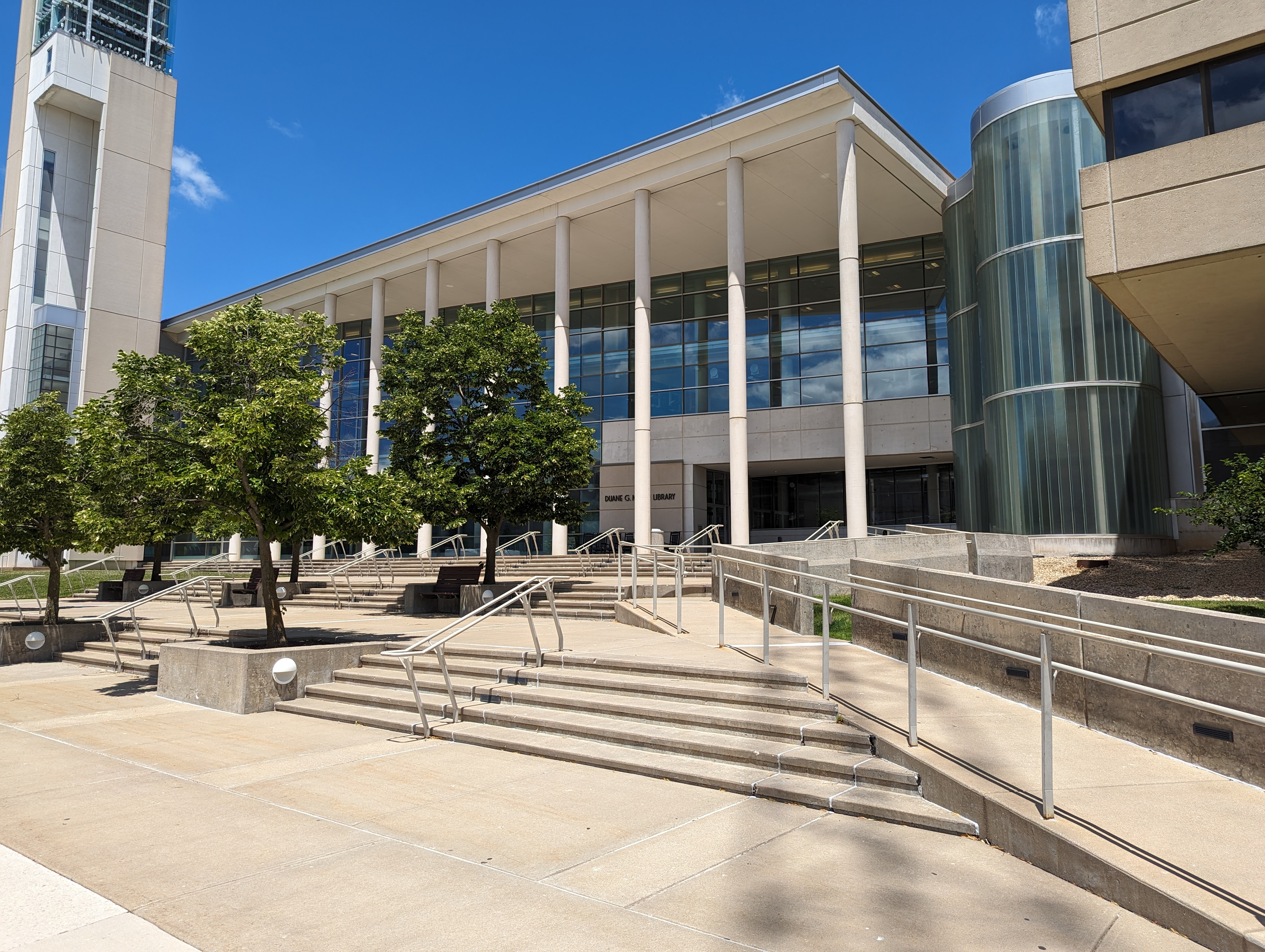
- Exterior of the library in 2024
- Location: Missouri State University, Springfield, Missouri, United States
- Type: Academic library
- Established: 1980; 46 years ago

The Duane G. Meyer Library is a library on the Missouri State University campus in Springfield, Missouri.

== Information ==
Built in 1980 and extensively renovated in 2002, it houses 877,000 books, subscriptions and back issues of over 3,500 periodicals, and online access to over 20,000 periodicals. The renovation added more than thirty group study rooms and stations and a dedicated Special Collections and Archives facility.

Meyer Library serves as a state, federal, and United Nations depository, with over 934,000 documents available from those bodies.

One notable feature of the Duane G. Meyer Library is the Jane A. Meyer Carillon bell tower, which contains 48 bronze bells that chime every quarter-hour.
