= Fonderie Paccard =

French foundry

Coordinates: 45.8449°N 6.15255°E

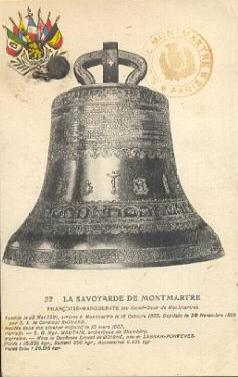
Postcard of la savoyarde

Fonderie Paccard is a French foundry in Annecy. Founded in 1796, the foundry has cast more than 120,000 bells located throughout the world. The foundry has been continuously operated by seven generations of the Paccard family. The largest bell cast by Paccard is the World Peace Bell.

Paccard is best known in the United States for its participation in the Liberty Bell Savings Bond Project. As part of the Marshall Plan, the foundry cast 57 replicas of the Liberty Bell in 1950 and 1951. Most of the bells were distributed, one each, to the then-48 U.S. states as tributes to their citizens' respective services in World War II. Most of the Liberty Bell Project bells survive and are on public display.

== Museum ==
The musée de la Cloche ("Museum of the Bell") was established in 1984 in Annecy-le-Vieux by Pierre and Françoise Paccard. It was moved to Sevrier when the foundry moved in 1989. Renamed musée Paccard ("Paccard Museum") in 2004, it was later expanded and renovated in 2020. In addition to the shop, the museum includes a cafe and tea room called "Au Paccard Gourmand", as well as an auditorium equipped with a carillon for performances.

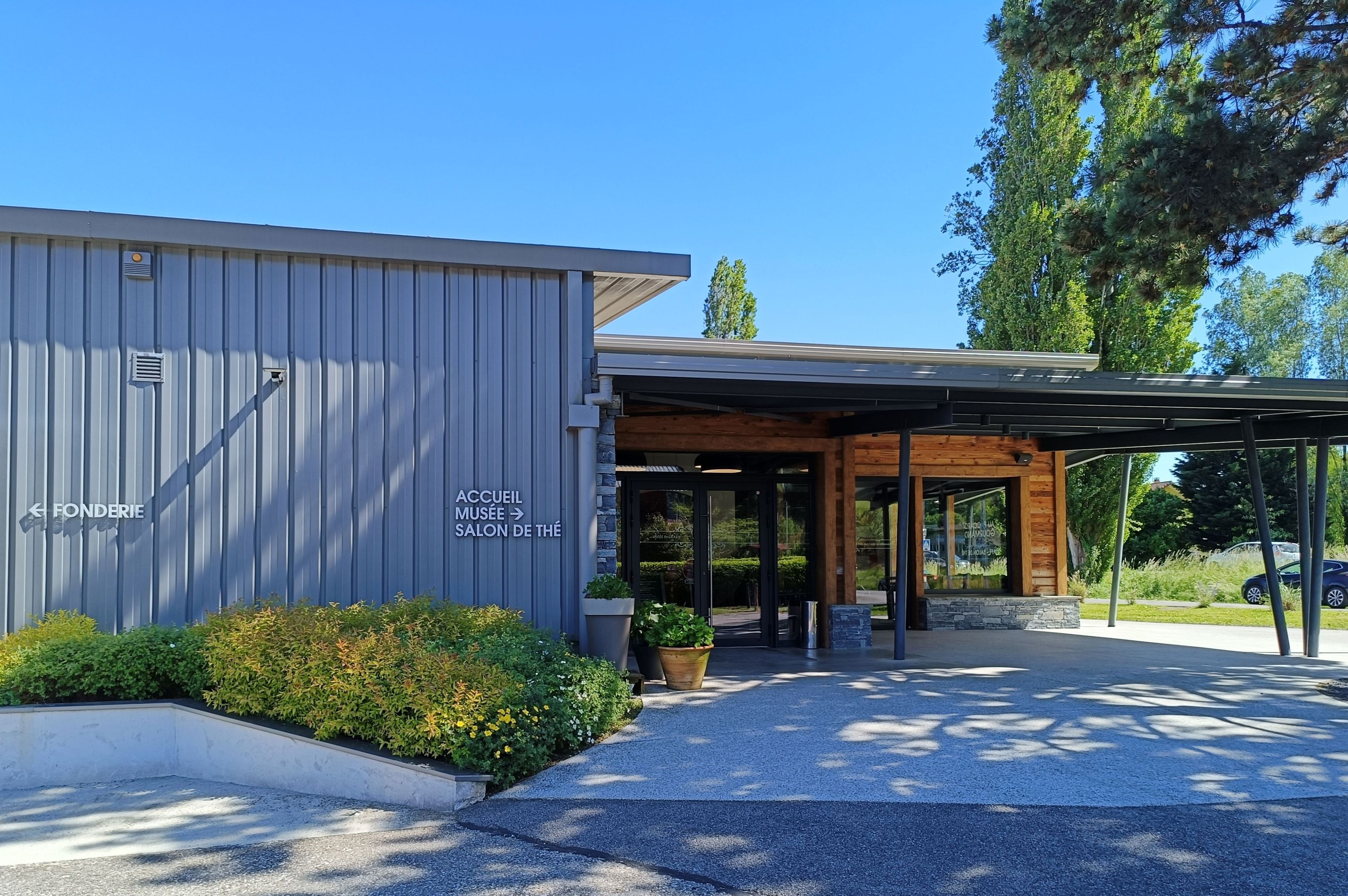
Entrance to the Paccard museum

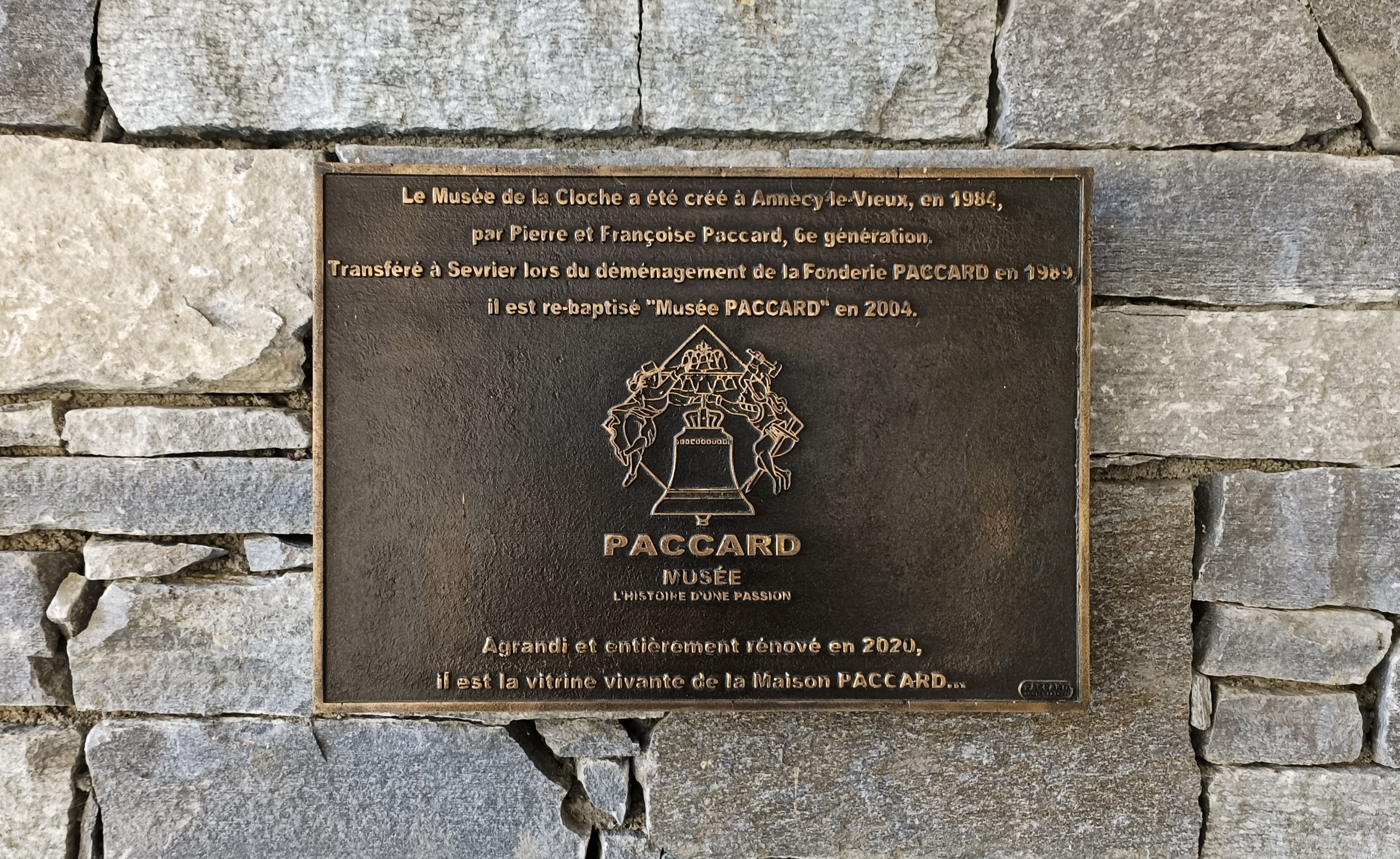
Plaque at the museum entrance

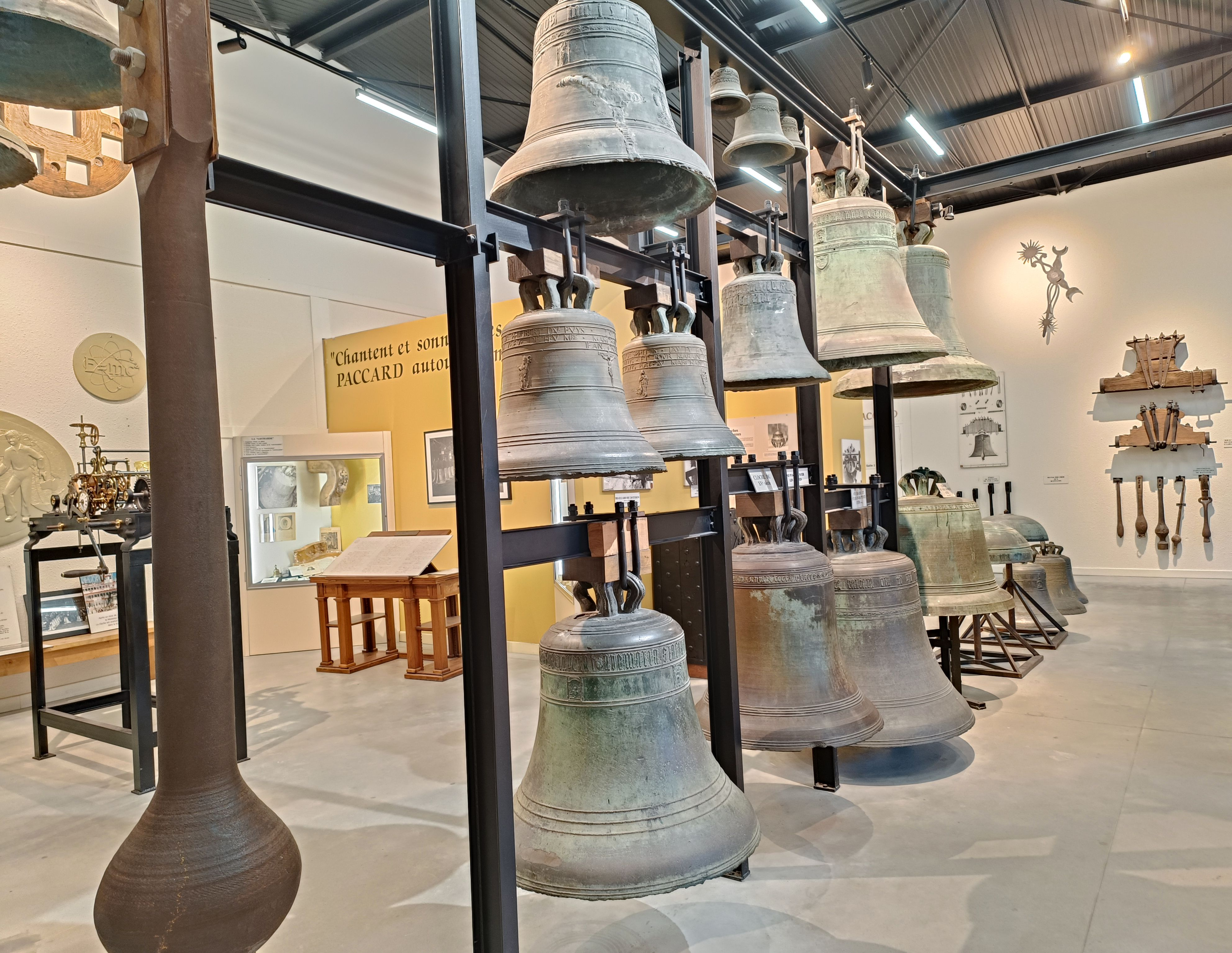
Old bells in the museum

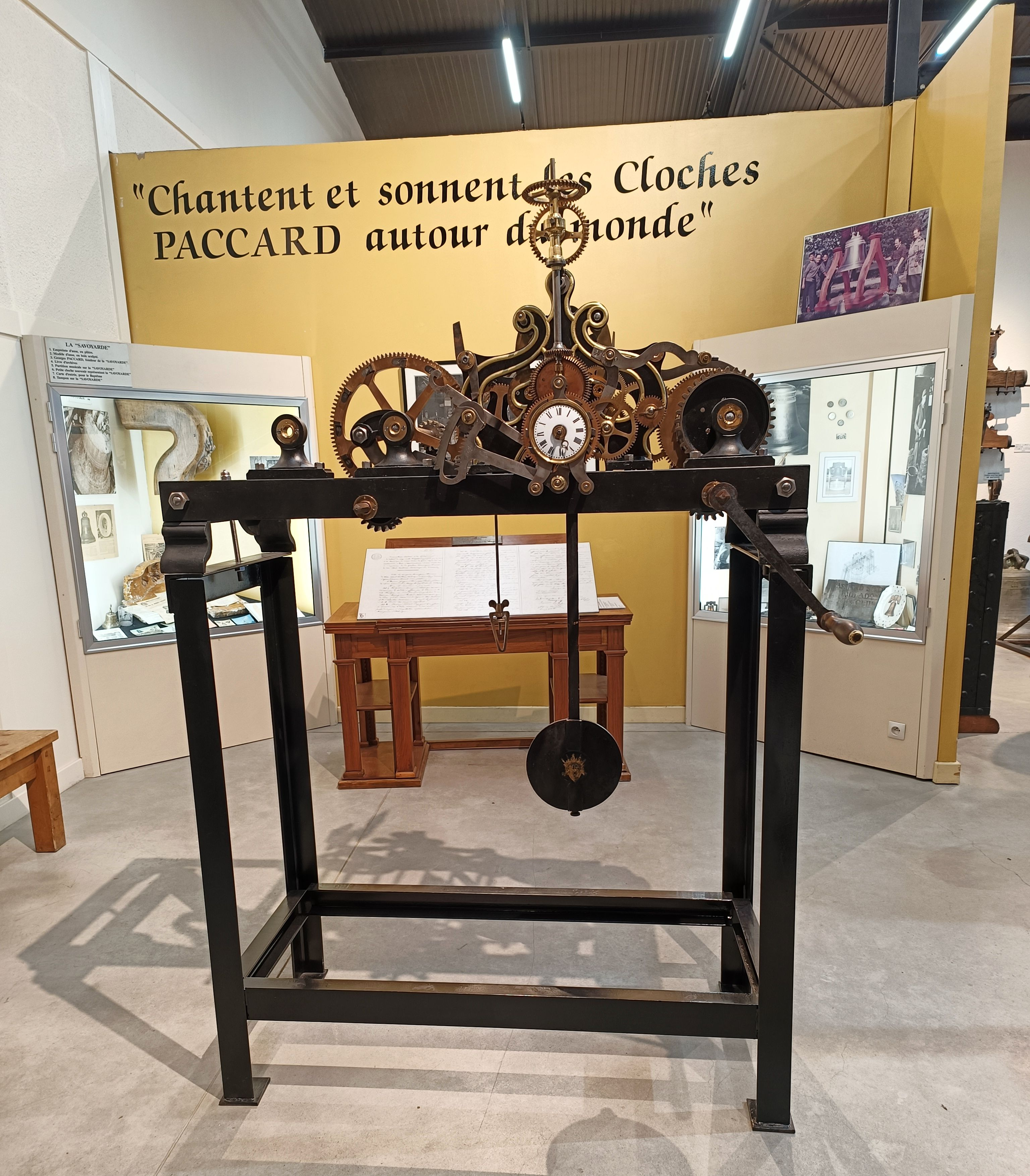
Clock mechanism in the museum

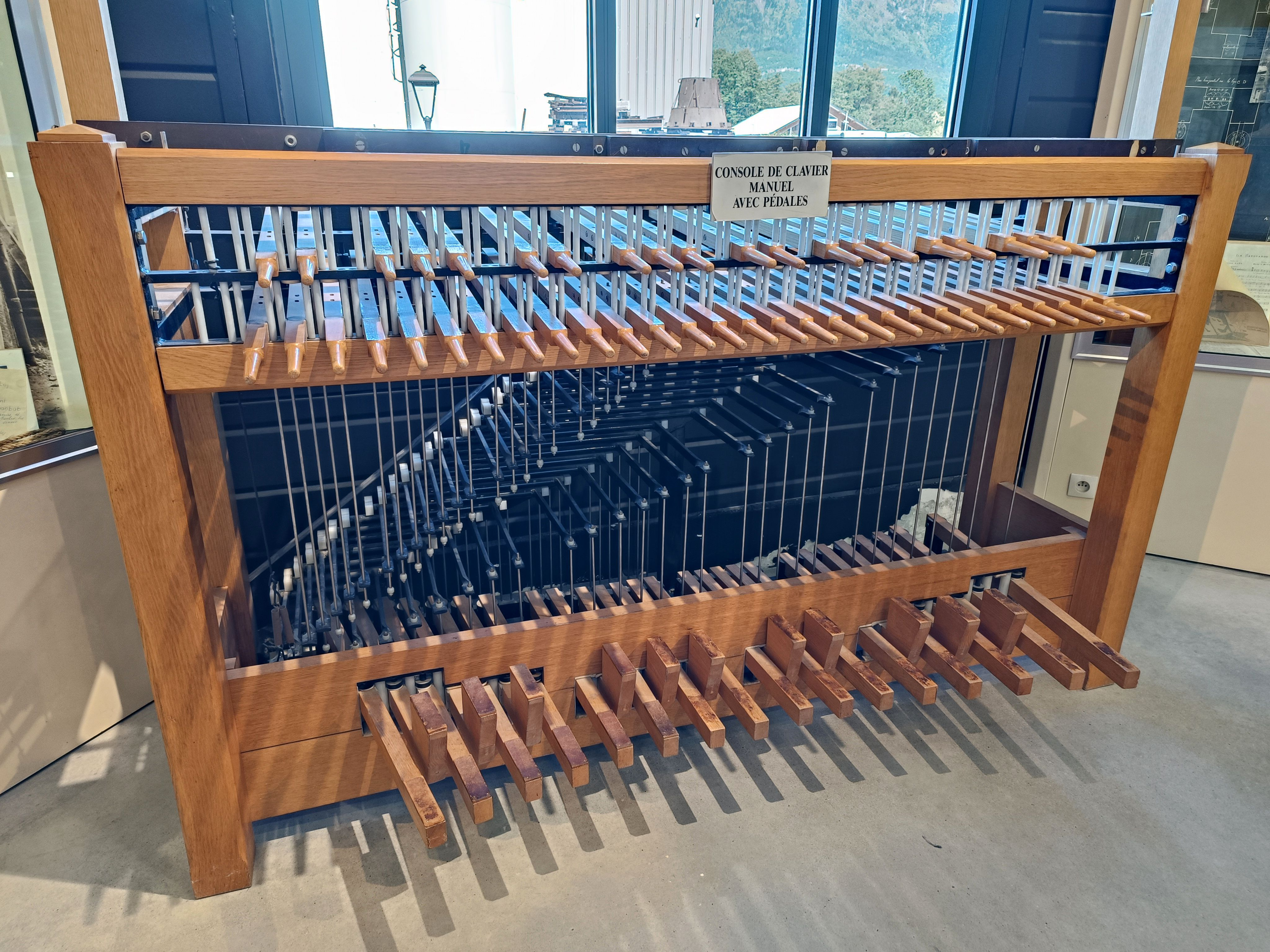
Carillon clavier

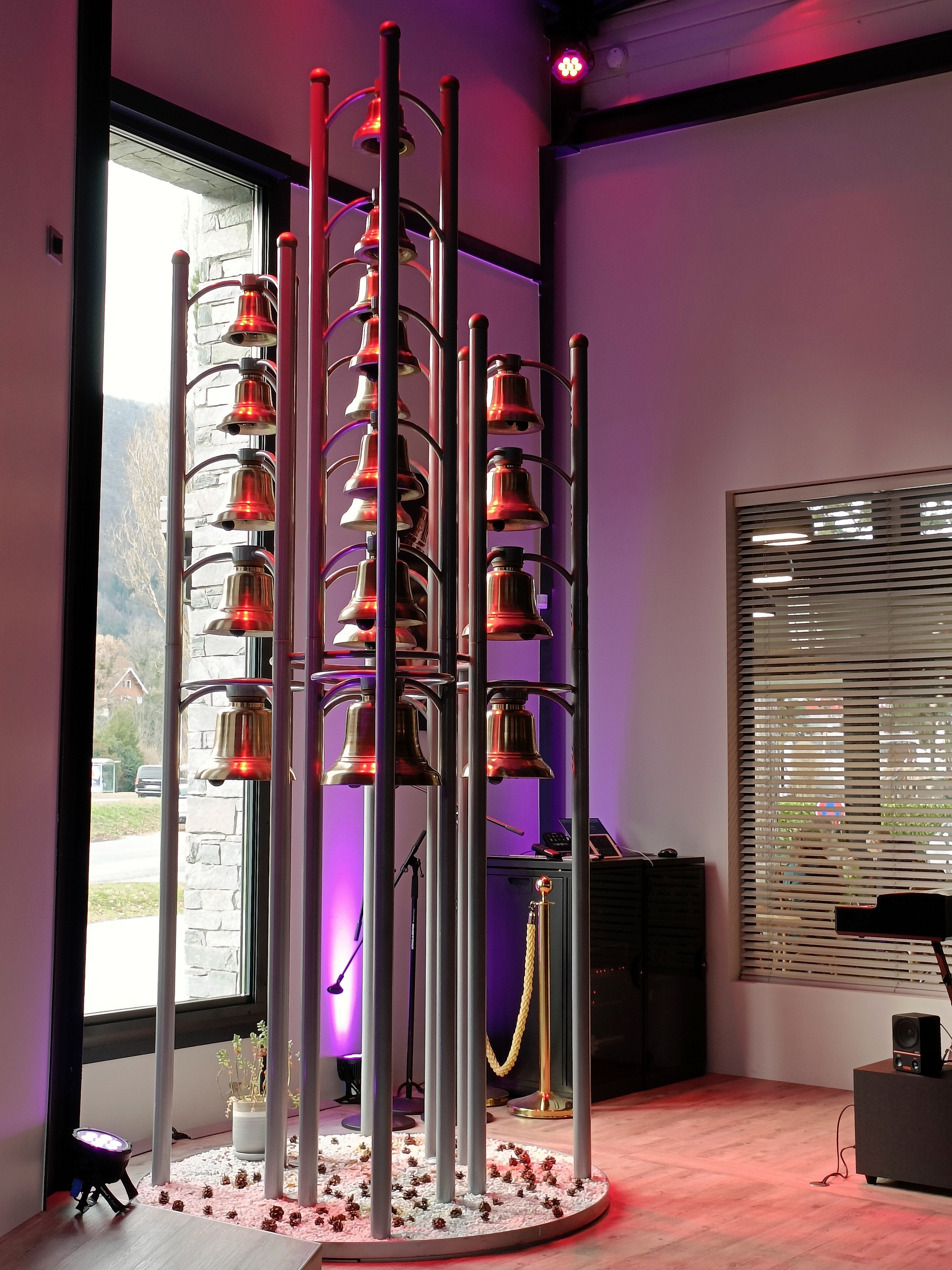
Carillon in the auditorium

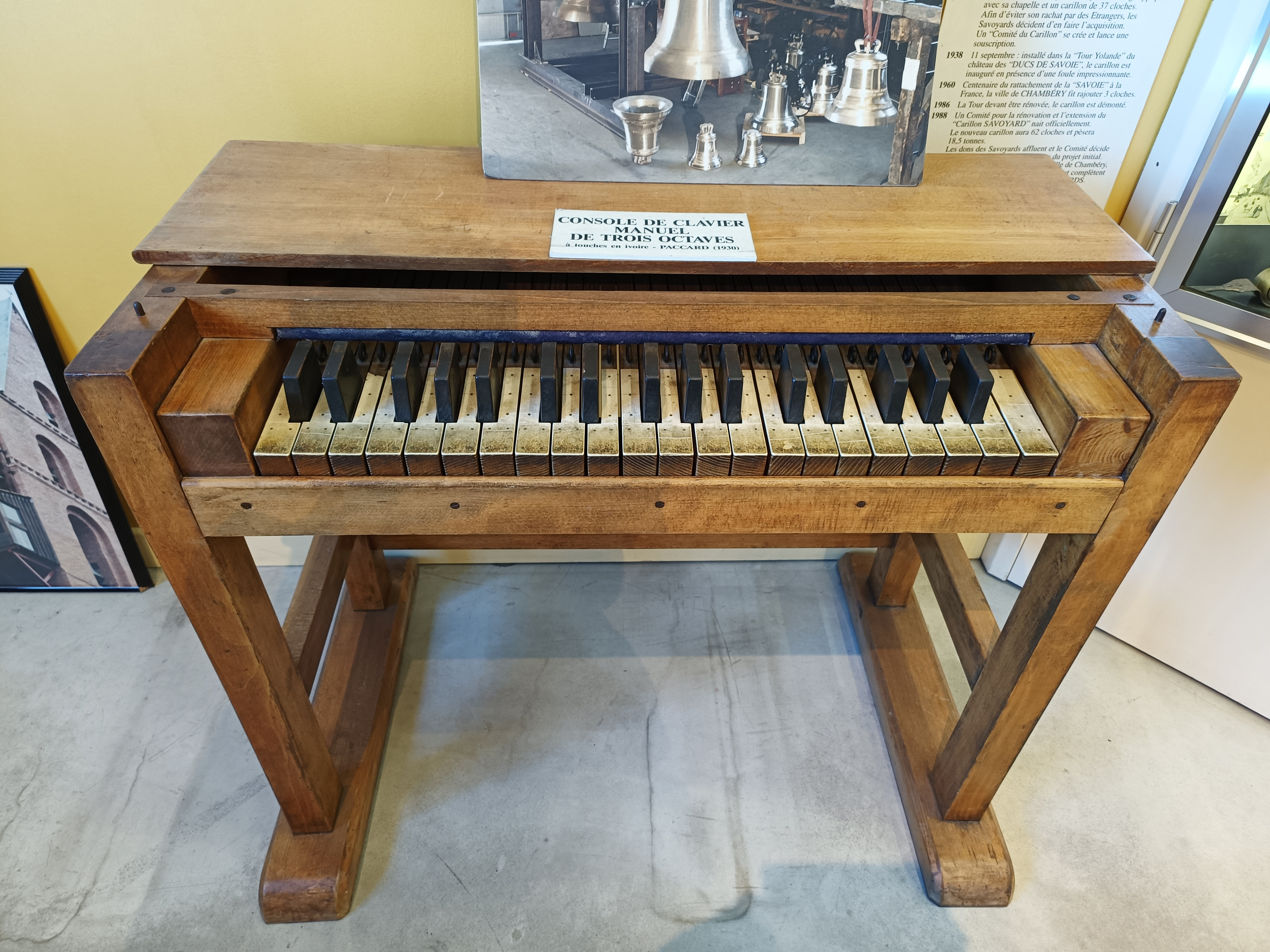
Carillon clavier inside the museum

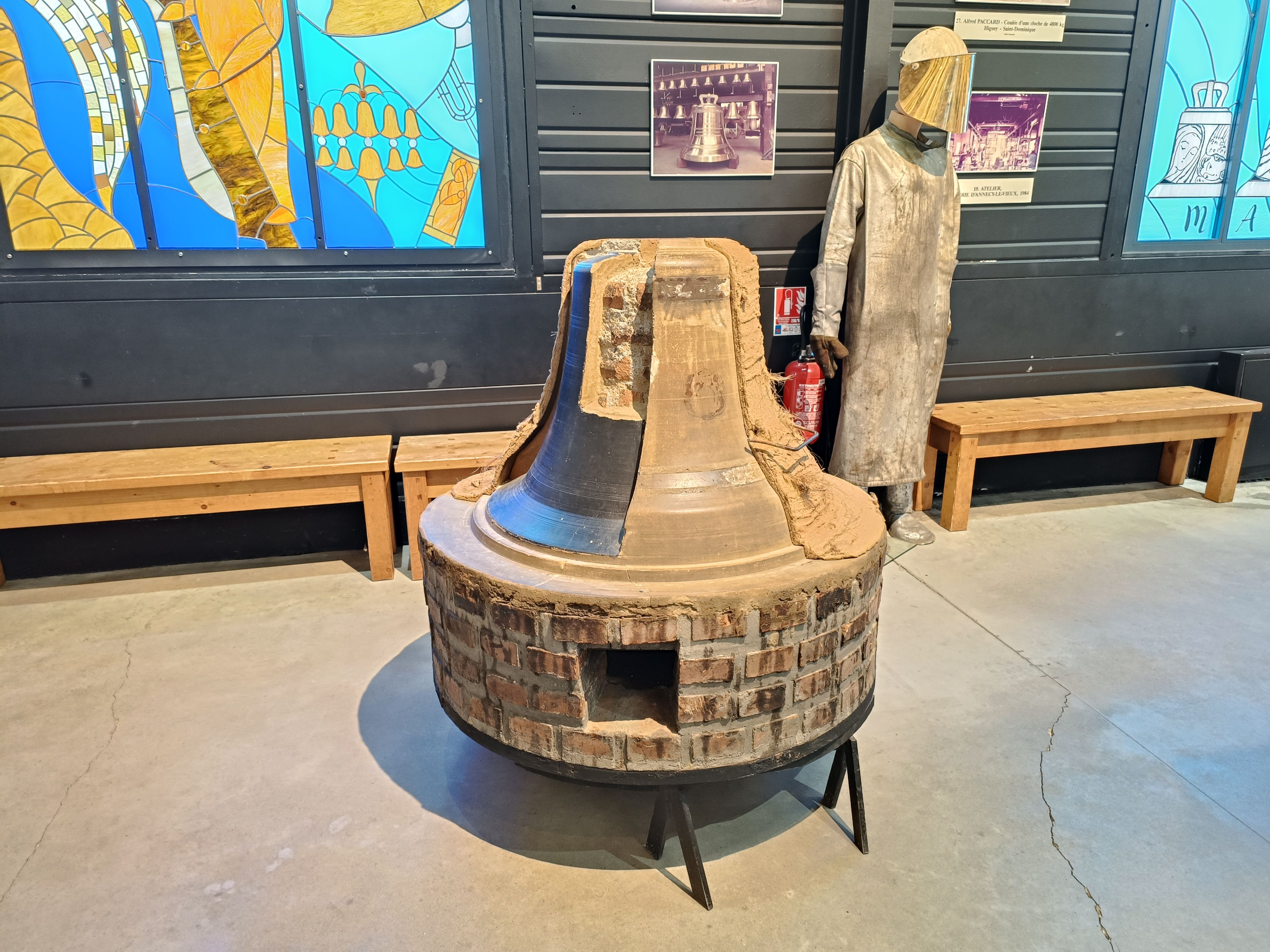
Cutaway display showing a bell at different stages of its creation
