= Acklen =

Acklen is a surname. Notable people with the surname include:

- Adelicia Acklen (1817–1887), American planter and socialite
- Joseph Alexander Smith Acklen (1816–1863), American lawyer, planter, and veteran
- Joseph H. Acklen (1850–1938), American sugar planter and politician

== See also ==
- Ackley (surname)
