= Joseph Acklen =

Joseph Acklen may refer to:

- Joseph H. Acklen (1850–1938), U. S. Representative from Louisiana
- Joseph Alexander Smith Acklen (1816–1863), his father, American lawyer, planter, and veteran of the Texas Revolution
