= William Hayes Ackland =

American writer, lawyer and art collector (1855–1940)

- Born: William Hayes Acklen; September 6, 1855; Nashville, Tennessee, U.S.
- Died: February 16, 1940 (aged 84); Ormond, Florida, U.S.
- Resting place: Ackland Art Museum at University of North Carolina at Chapel Hill – originally buried at Mount Olivet Cemetery in Nashville, TN
- Occupations: Author; Lawyer; Art collector
- Spouse: Laura Crocker
- Parents: Joseph Alexander Smith Acklen; Adelicia Acklen
- Relatives: Joseph H. Acklen (brother)

William Hayes Ackland (born William H. Acklen, September 6, 1855 – February 16, 1940) was an American lawyer, writer, and art collector from Nashville, Tennessee. He lived most of his life away from Tennessee, in Washington, DC, and various social spots, traveling to England annually for its social season. The Ackland Art Museum at the University of North Carolina Chapel Hill was begun with his collection.

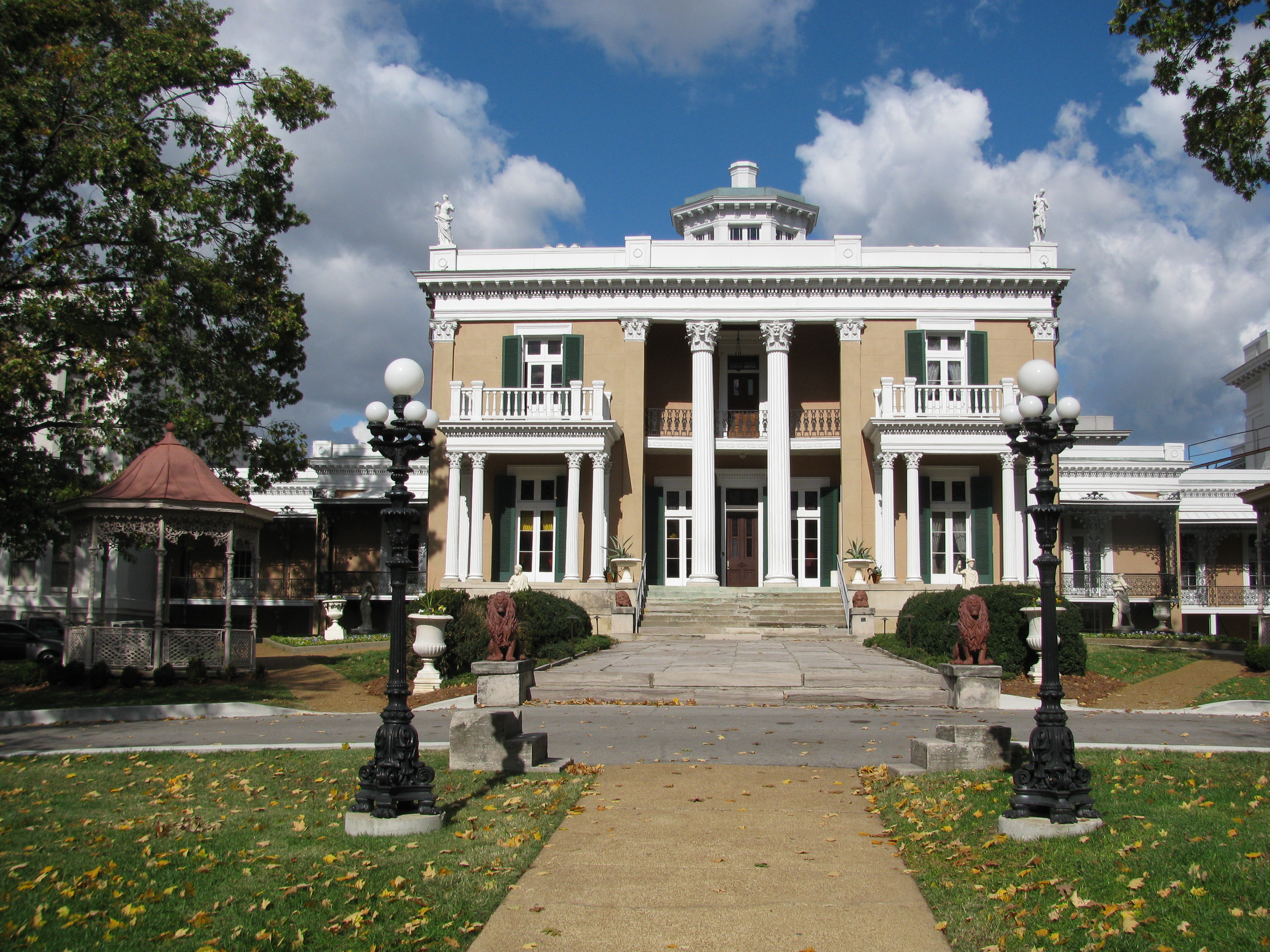
Belmont Mansion

== Early life ==
William Hayes Acklen was born on September 6, 1855, in Nashville, Tennessee. He changed his last name to Ackland by 1892.

He was a son of Colonel Joseph Alexander Smith Acklen (1816–1863), a lawyer from Alabama who had served in the Mexican–American War of 1846–1848, and Adelicia (Hayes) Franklin Acklen (1817–1887). She was a wealthy widow when she married Col. Acklen, and their children benefitted by her wealth. His maternal grandfather, Oliver Bliss Hayes (1783–1858), was a lawyer and later Presbyterian minister from South Hadley, Massachusetts; he was related to Rutherford B. Hayes (1822–1893), who served as President of the United States from 1877 to 1881. William's older brother, Joseph H. Acklen (1850–1938), served as U.S. Representative from Louisiana from 1878 to 1881.

Acklen grew up at his family's summer home, later a permanent residence for the family, Belmont Mansion, in Nashville, and on his mother's family plantations in Louisiana. He received a Bachelor of Arts from the University of Nashville, followed by a Bachelor of Laws from Vanderbilt University. He was one of the first students at Vanderbilt, attending when the university first opened.

== Career ==
After law school, Acklen moved to Washington, D.C., where he officially practiced as a lawyer. In the 1880s, he also worked at journalism in Philadelphia, Pennsylvania.

Acklen was part of a wealthy social class, spending much of his time attending society galas and balls in Washington, and also in Ormond Beach, Florida; Lake Mohonk, and York Harbor, Maine. He traveled to England annually for its season. He became known as a genteel gentleman and a member of high society.

When Acklen published his novel Sterope: The Veiled Pleiad(1892), it was under his changed surname as "Ackland". He also published three volumes of poetry and a memoir.

Ackland wrote plays and frequently attended theatre. He corresponded with older writers such as Henry Wadsworth Longfellow (1807–1882), Ralph Waldo Emerson (1803–1882), Oliver Wendell Holmes Sr. (1809–1894), James Russell Lowell (1819–1891), and John Greenleaf Whittier (1807–1892).

Ackland became an important art collector. To preserve his art collection, he wanted to establish a museum on a Southern university campus. But, Duke University and Rollins College rejected hosting a museum in his name. The University of North Carolina at Chapel Hill agreed, and the Ackland Art Museum was established on its campus.

== Personal life and death ==
Ackland married Laura Crocker (1871–1931) on June 2, 1896, in Cleveland, Ohio. They had no children and divorced a year later. He inherited US$100,000 from one of his late half-sisters. By the time of his death, he left an estate of US$1,350,000.

In his later years, Ackland became a Knight Templar.

At the end of his life, Ackland resided in Ormond, Florida, where he died on February 16, 1940. He was buried in Mount Olivet Cemetery, but his body was moved in 1958 to the Ackland Art Museum at the University of North Carolina at Chapel Hill per his bequest, where it remains today.

== Works ==
- William Hayes Ackland, Sterope: The Veiled Pleiad (Washington, D.C., 1892).
