= Jackley =

Jackley is a surname. Notable people with the surname include:

- Brock Jackley (born 1947), American politician in the state of Washington
- Jessica Jackley (born 1977), American entrepreneur who co-founded Kiva and ProFounder
- Marty Jackley (born 1970), American attorney and 30th Attorney General of South Dakota
- Nat Jackley (1909–1988), English comic actor starring in variety, film and pantomime
- Stephen Jackley, convicted British robber and author

== See also ==
- Ackley (disambiguation)
- Jack (disambiguation)
