= Fairvue Plantation (Gallatin, Tennessee) =

- Fairvue
- Formerly listed on the U.S. National Register of Historic Places
- U.S. Historic district
- Former U.S. National Historic Landmark
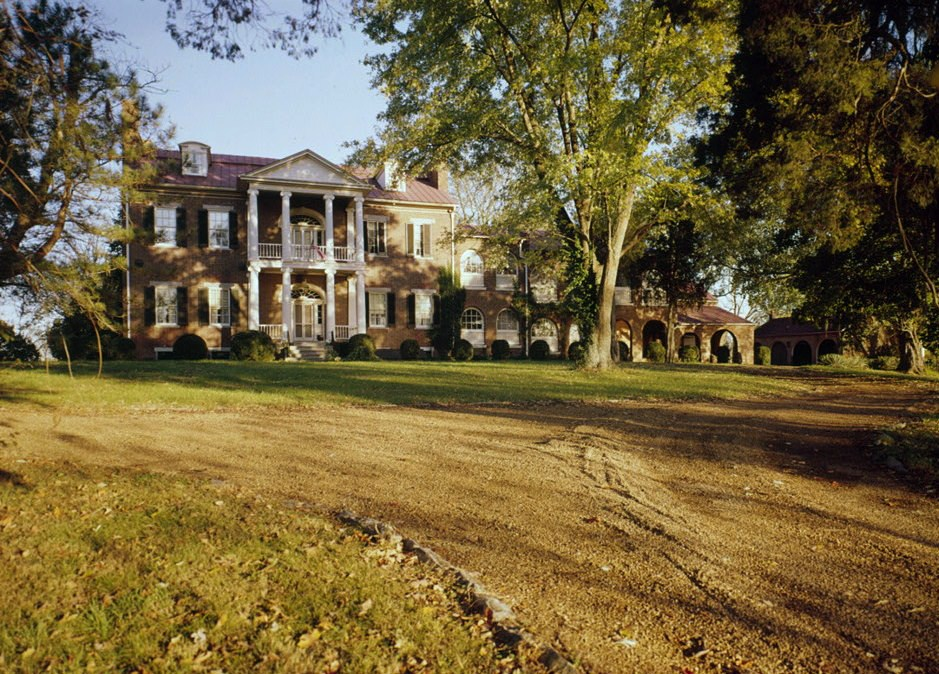
- Fairvue in 1971

- Location within Tennessee Location within the United States
- Nearest city: Gallatin, Tennessee
- Coordinates: 36°20′41″N 86°29′36″W
- Area: 560 acres (230 ha)
- Built: 1832
- NRHP reference No.: 75002162
- Removed from NRHP: April 04, 2005

Fairvue Plantation was created as an antebellum plantation near Gallatin, Tennessee by Isaac Franklin. After the Civil War, it was turned into a horse farm by Charles Reed, and was later purchased and restored by the Wemyss family. By 2004 it had been transformed into a golf course community of luxury homes with various buildings from its past restored.

== Antebellum History ==
Fairvue Plantation was created in 1832 by Isaac Franklin (1789–1846). In 1836 after a career as a partner in the largest slave-trading firm in the southern United States - Franklin and Armfield - prior to the Civil War, Franklin transitioned to a career as a wealthy planter. Franklin and his family divided their time between his 2,000 acre Fairvue Plantation near Gallatin, Tennessee in the summer and his West Feliciana Parish, Louisiana estate of several adjoining plantations, known as the Angola Plantations, in the winter.

Franklin's 1847 estate inventory listed 138 enslaved Africans on Fairvue Plantation. The inventory also listed 276 sheep, 500 hogs, 65 head of cattle and 16 blooded racehorses. Fairvue's main purpose, rather than growing cotton or tobacco, was to supply his Louisiana plantations with corn, mules, bacon and other commodities. Franklin often shipped corn from Fairvue to his Louisiana estate; however, it wasn't enough.

Under Franklin's ownership the approximately 8,000 acre Louisiana estate was made up of the adjoining plantations of Angola, Bellevue, Killarney, Loango, Panola, and Lochlomond. When the Franklins were in Louisiana, they stayed in a large residence on Angola Plantation. Angola Plantation was on the Mississippi River; and it operated mainly as a woodlot, making its profits from the sale of wood that steamboats on the river needed for fuel. His other Louisiana plantations were cotton plantations.

At Isaac's 1846 death, Isaac's will put some of his assets into trusts for his children (all of whom died in childhood), and Adelicia was provided for until she remarried. She remarried in 1849 to Joseph Alexander Smith Acklen. Isaac's will stipulated that Fairvue was supposed to become a school that was endowed by the Louisiana plantations at some point. After marrying Joseph, Adelicia went to court and got the will declared void. She, thus, at least acquired the Louisiana plantations, but Fairvue stayed in Isaac's estate with John Armfield as executor. Without the income from the Louisiana plantations, the school never formed. Even without Fairvue, Adelicia's inheritance from Isaac's estate made her the wealthiest woman in Tennessee. The estate was valued at approximately $750,000. It included:

- 2,000 acre Fairvue real estate worth $40,000
- Personal property at Fairvue Plantation worth $62,819, which included 138 enslaved Africans on Fairvue worth $51,931 of the $62,819
- 50,000 acres in Texas worth $25,000
- The Louisiana estate valued at approximately $570,000, which included seven plantations
- Land in Mississippi

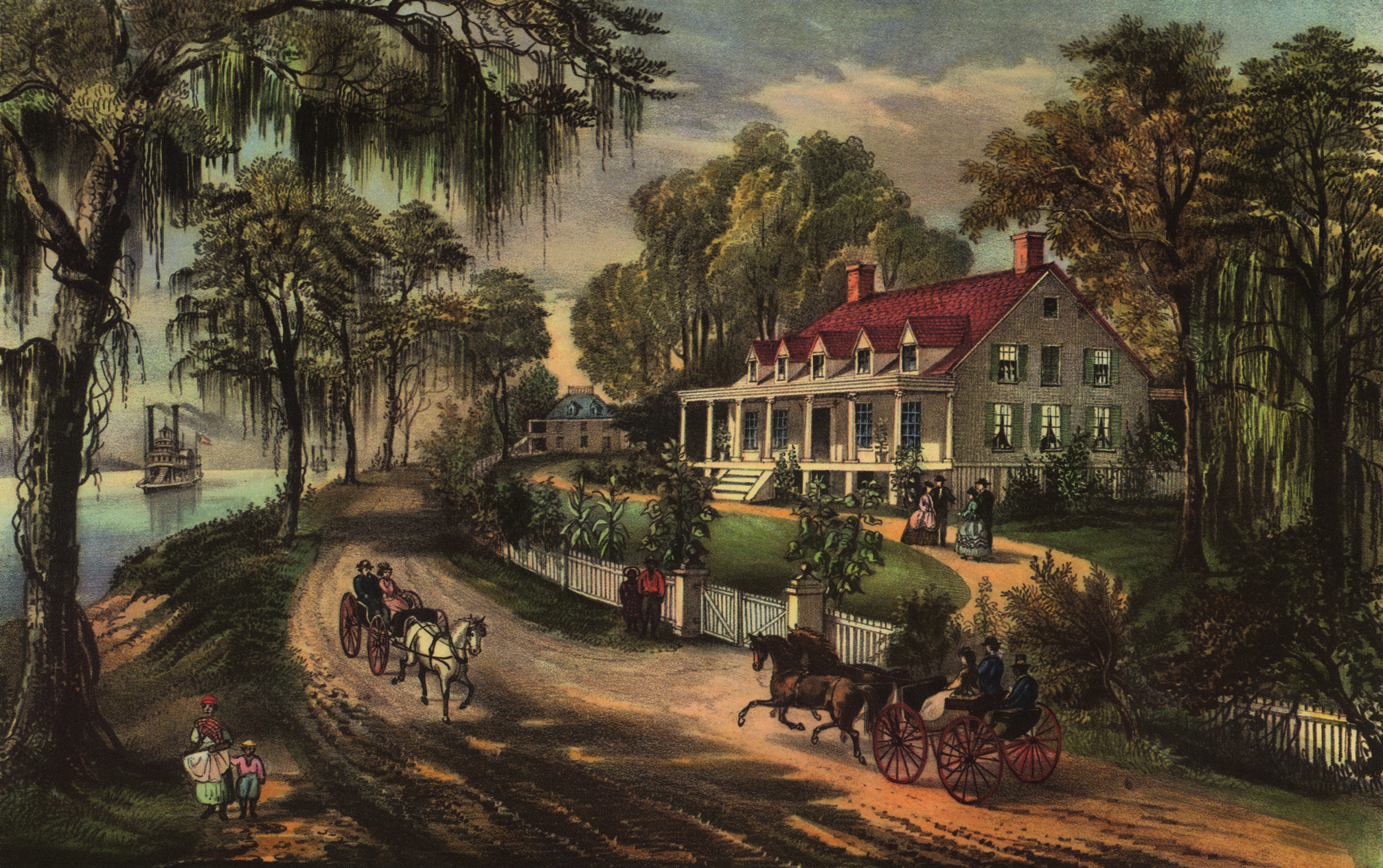
An idyllic depiction of a house like Adelicia's Angola Plantation house by Currier and Ives

Joseph increased the fortune. In Louisiana the couple eventually had 659 enslaved Africans working on the 4,000 improved acres of the approximately 8,000 acre Louisiana estate, which produced 3,149 bales of cotton in 1859. Because she did not inherit Fairvue Plantation, Adilicia changed her summer residence from Fairvue Plantation to her newly created Belmont Mansion and estate near Nashville, Tennessee. Adelicia's second husband Joseph Acklen died of pneumonia at Angola Plantation in 1863.

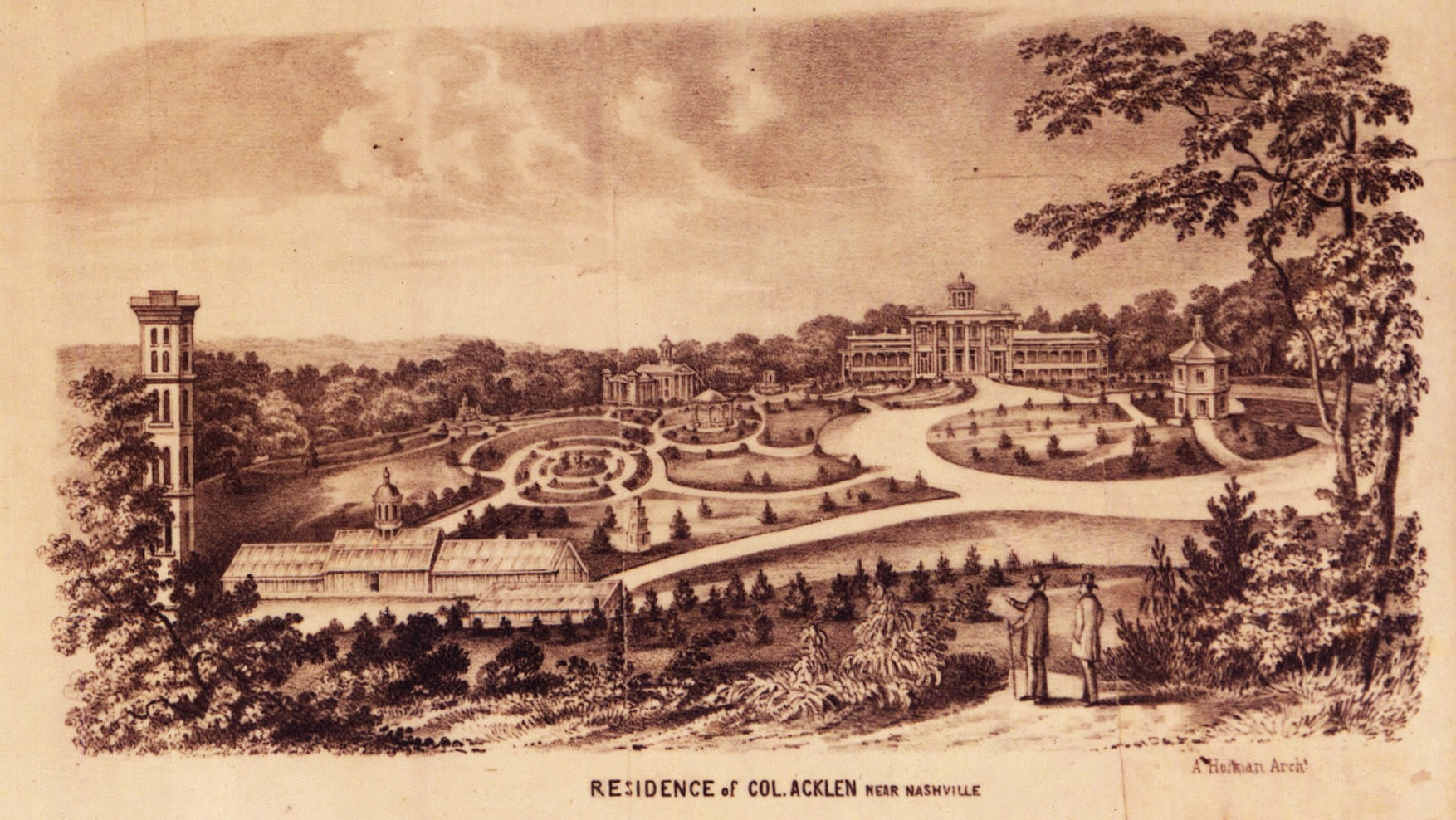
The Belmont Estate - Residence of Col. Acklen near Nashville, Tennessee (1860)

In 1863 Adelicia's husband had died, her cotton crops from 1861 and 1862 at her Louisiana plantations were still in storage in Louisiana. The enslaved Africans had all left because the Civil War allowed them to be free, and the 1863 cotton crop was rotting in the fields. Thus, in 1864 Adelicia travelled to Louisiana to try to save her cotton. By convincing the Confederate soldiers that she would use her money from the sale of her cotton to help them, she persuaded the Confederates to help her get her cotton to New Orleans. In New Orleans, she convinced the Union soldiers that she would use her cotton money to help them, so they opened the naval blockade for her cotton to be sold in Britain. She travelled to Britain and got the approximately $800,000 proceeds from the sale of her 2,800 bales of cotton herself, so that she could keep either army from getting the money. This left her once again a very rich woman, in spite of the wealth she lost when her approximately 659 enslaved Africans were set free by the Emancipation Proclamation.

== American Civil War and postbellum history ==
In 1869, Adelicia bought Fairvue from John Armfield - executor of Franklin's estate.

Adelicia, who in 1867 married for a third and final time to Dr. William A. Cheatham, separated from him in 1880; and sold her Louisiana plantations for $100,000, moving to Washington D.C. where she died in 1887. These plantations eventually became the Louisiana State Penitentiary known as Angola.

In approximately 1882, New York banker and Racehorse enthusiast Charles Reed purchased the 2,000 acre Fairvue Plantation for $50,000 from Adelicia. Reed had changed his last name from Weed to Reed, because his New York family disowned him for running Confederate ships between New Orleans and England. Reed transformed Fairvue Plantation into a race horse breeding farm. Reed had many famous race horses at Fairvue. He sold his horses in about 1900 because he realized that he was overspending on them. For example, Reed had bought the English Derby winner St. Blaise for $100,000 in 1882. He sold Fairvue in 1908 to a syndicate who subdivided its 2,000 acres into smaller farms.

For 20 years after 1908, Fairvue had a succession of owners. Then in 1929 the plantation was purchased by the Sumner Land Company. It became the headquarters of Grasslands Hunt and Racing Club - a sixty to eighty farm fox hunting and steeplechase club between Hendersonville and Gallatin. Plans were made to restore the mansion and remaining estate, developing it into a recreation area for riding, Hunting and fishing. The Great Depression prevented this restoration of Fairvue. In 1932 the Sumner Land Company declared bankruptcy.

In 1934, after about 20 years of neglect, William Wemyss bought Fairvue Plantation. Wemyss was the founder of the company that became Genesco. William married Ellen Stokes Moore in 1939. She restored Fairvue.

In 1956, three hundred and twenty acres of Fairvue Farms was flooded when Old Hickory Dam was built on the Cumberland River. This left the mansion on a peninsula.

Fairvue was named a National Historic Landmark in 1977. Five Hundred and fifty acres was the size of the Fairvue Plantation historic landmark. It included the mansion, three slave quarters, the overseer's house, spring house, ice house and the ruins of Isaac Franklin's burial vault.

The remaining Fairvue Plantation site, was bought by developers in about 1999. They developed the site into a luxury golf community with over 400 homes, which opened in 2004. Thus, in 2005 the historic site's landmark status was withdrawn due to development that had damaged its historic integrity.

== Gallery ==
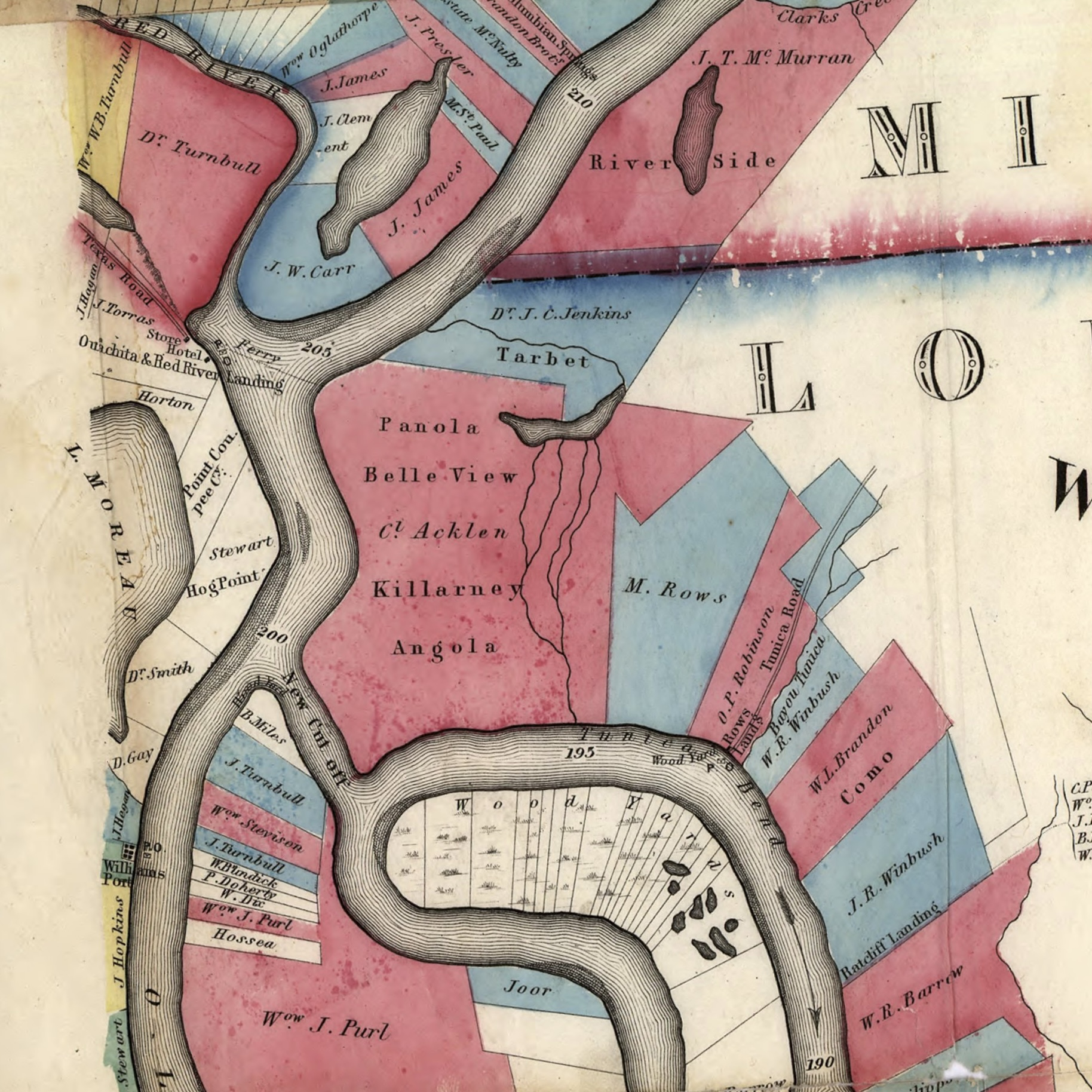
Map of some of Isaac Franklin's and later Adelicia Acklen's plantations in Louisiana in 1858

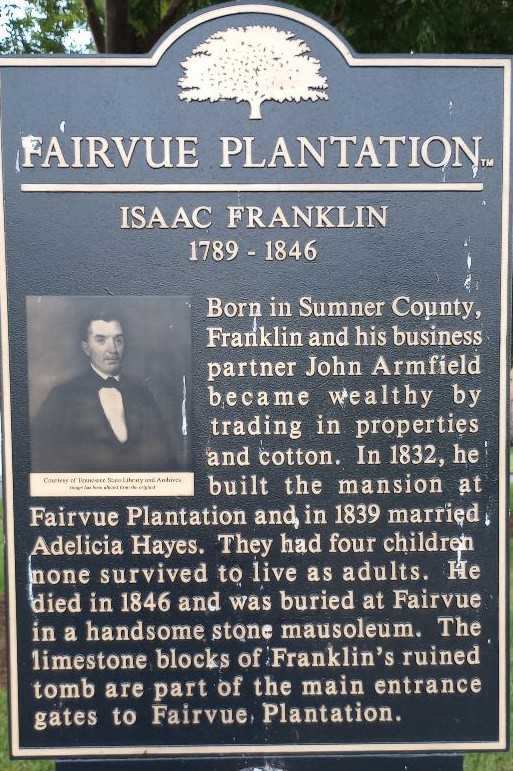
Fairvue Plantation Historic Marker Isaac Franklin

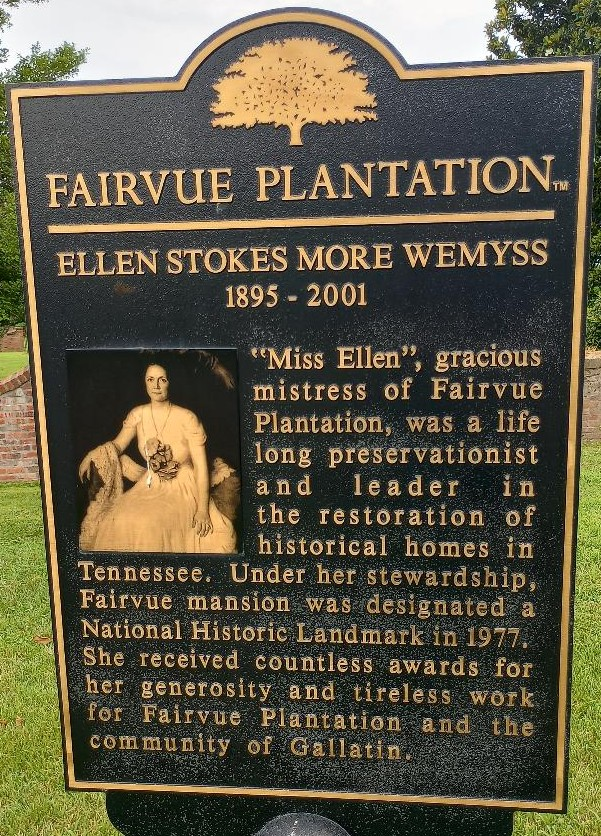
Fairvue Plantation Historic Marker; Ellen Stokes More Wemyss; Gallatin, Tennessee

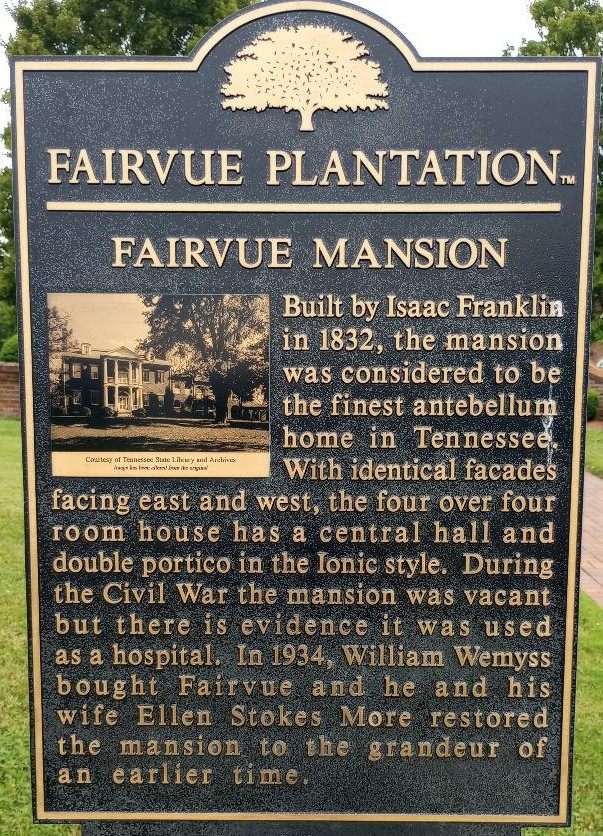
Fairvue Plantation Mansion; Gallatin, Tennessee

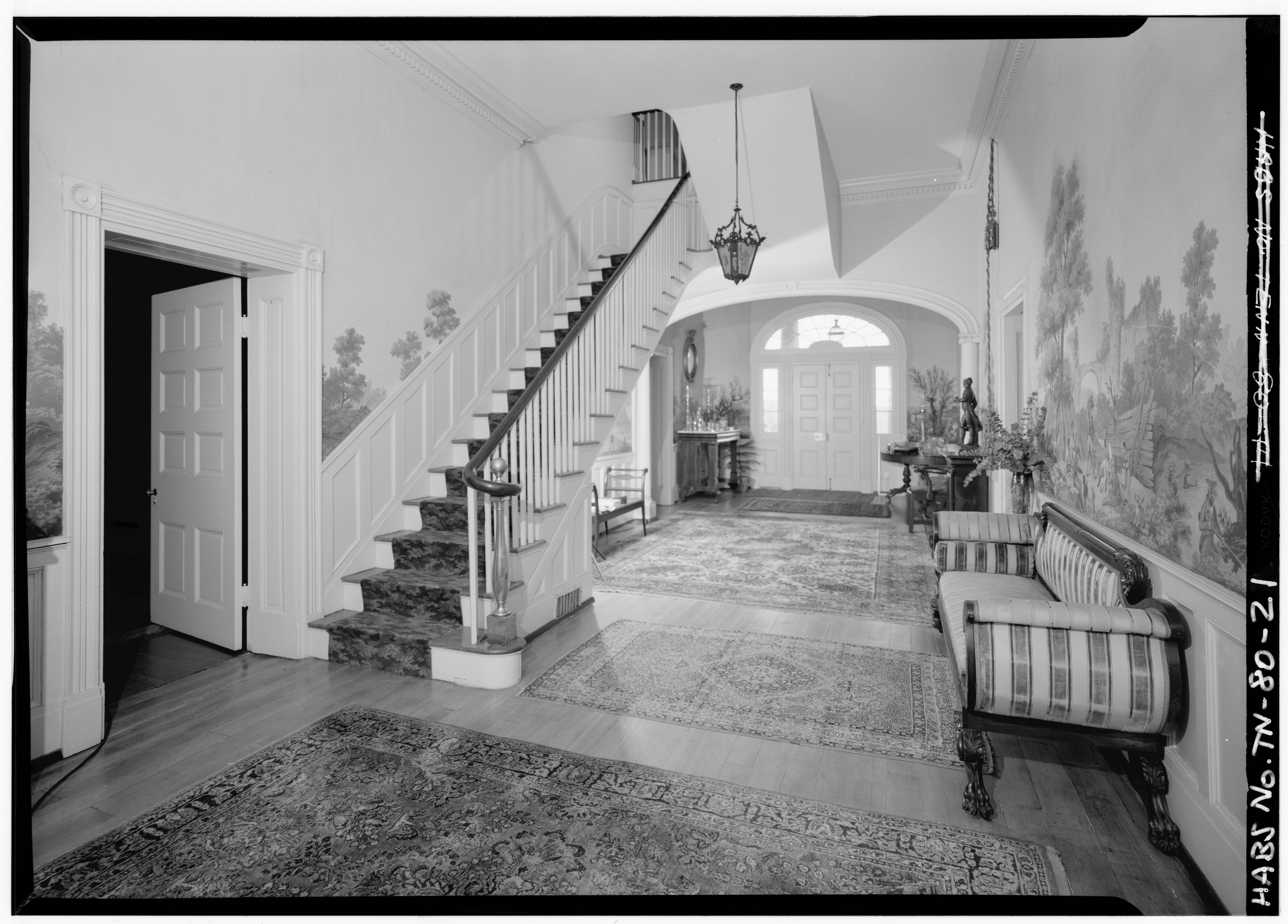
STAIRHALL, FIRST FLOOR, FROM WEST. NOTE BRASS NEWELL (probably an original feature of house) - Fairvue, U.S. Highway 31-E, Gallatin, Sumner County, TN HABS TENN,83-GAL.V,1-21

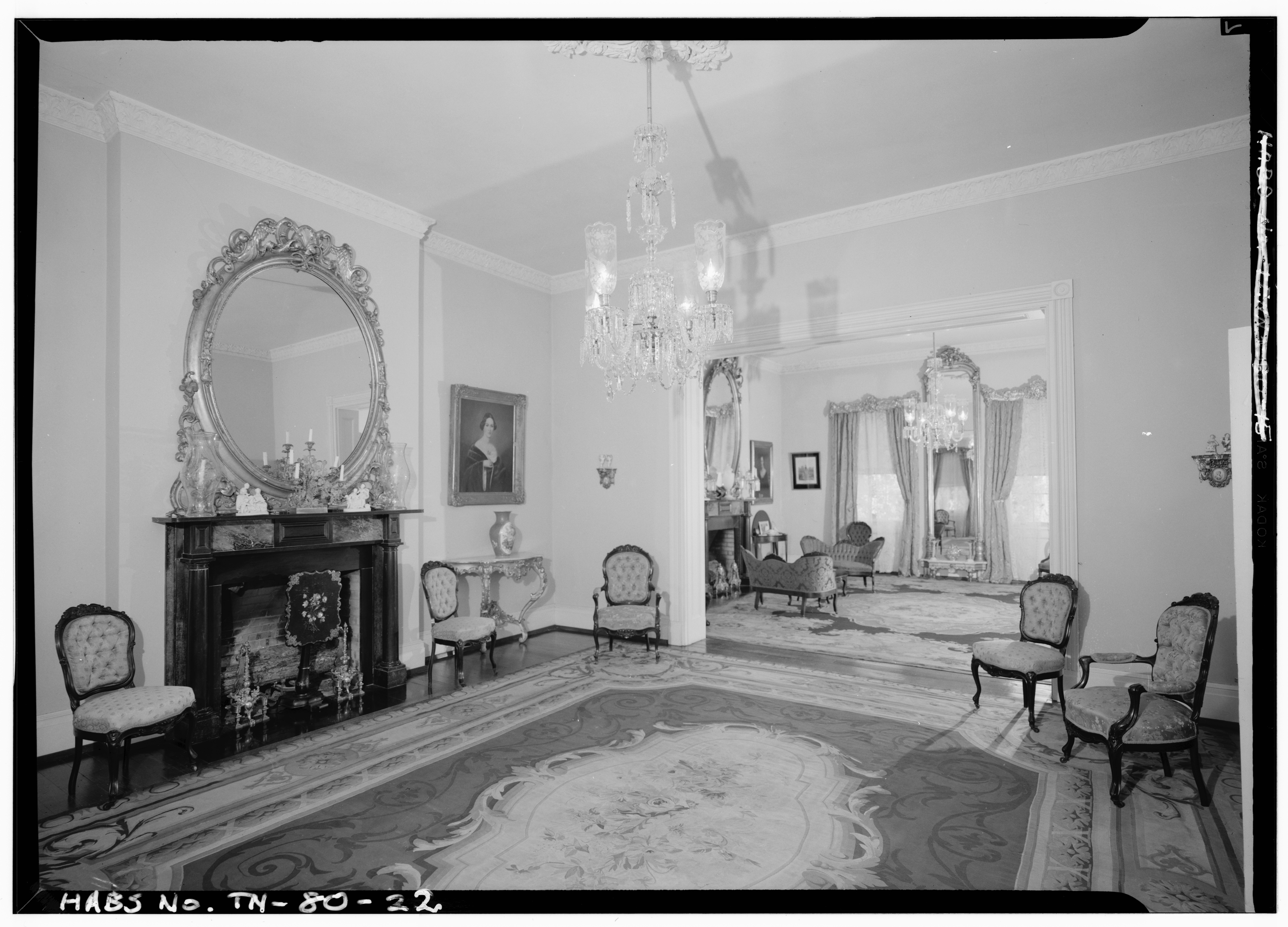
DOUBLE PARLORS, NORTH SIDE OF FIRST FLOOR FROM WEST. NOTE INTERIOR TRIM - Fairvue, U.S. Highway 31-E, Gallatin, Sumner County, TN HABS TENN,83-GAL.V,1-22

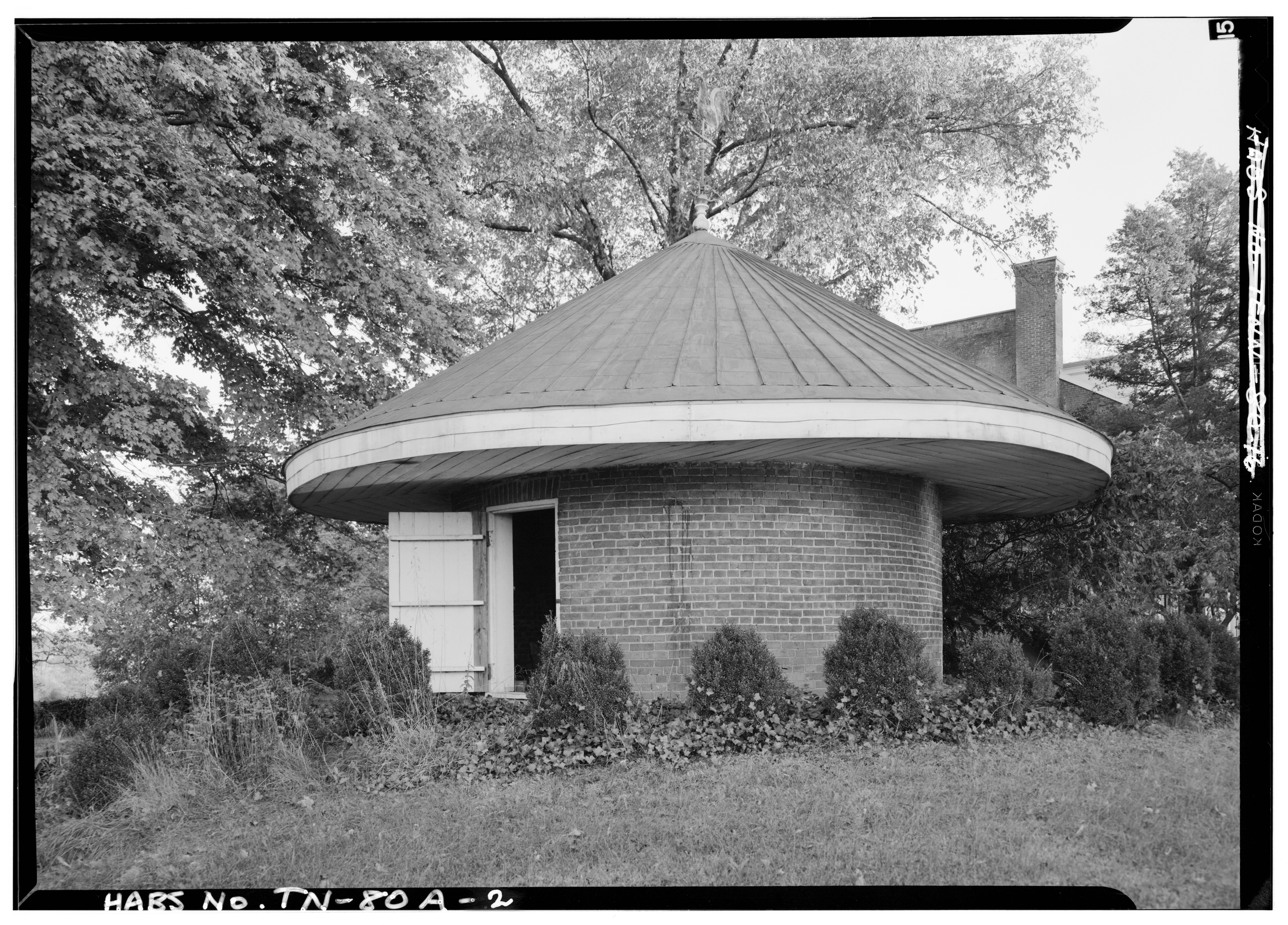
GENERAL VIEW OF ICEHOUSE, FROM NORTH - Fairvue, icehouse, U.S. Highway 31-E, Gallatin, Sumner County, TN HABS TENN,83-GAL.V,1A-2

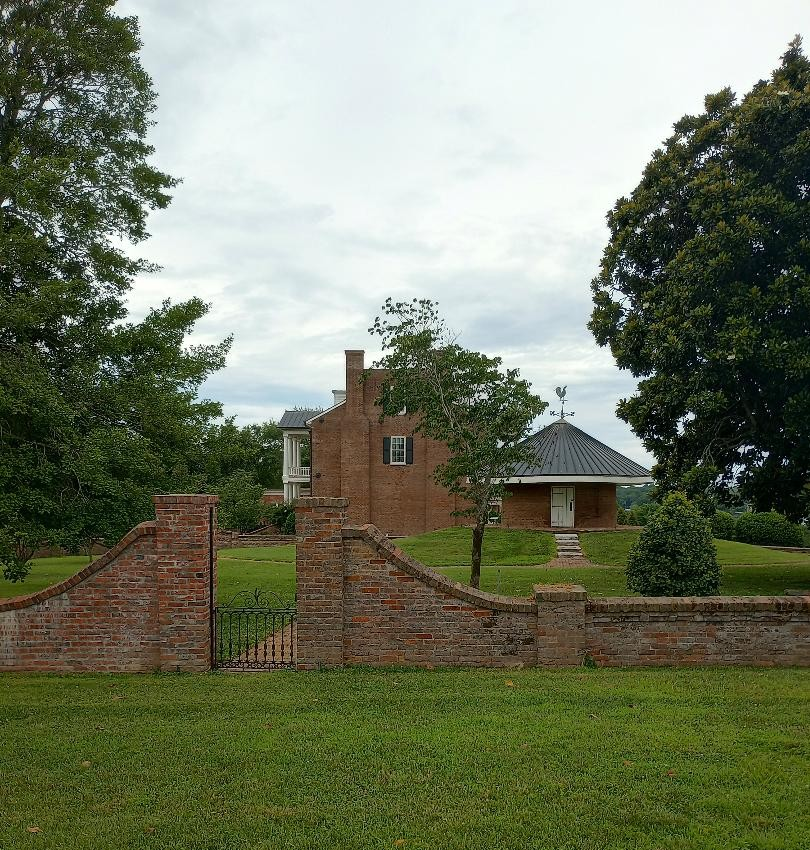
Fairvue Plantation; restored icehouse; Gallatin, Tennessee

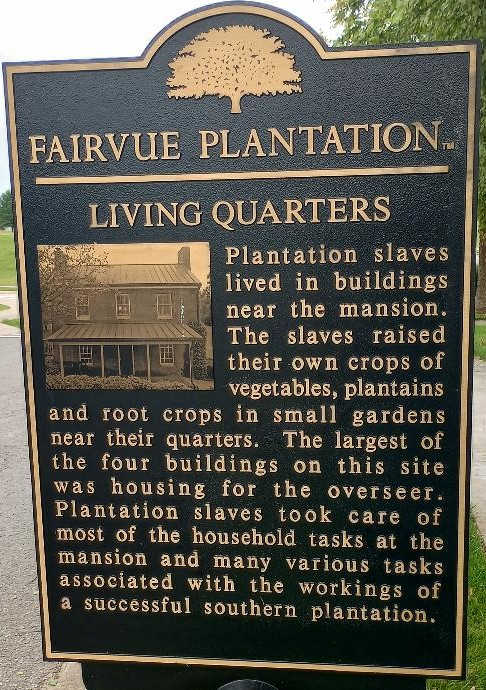
Fairvue Plantation Historic Marker; Overseer's House; Gallatin, Tennessee

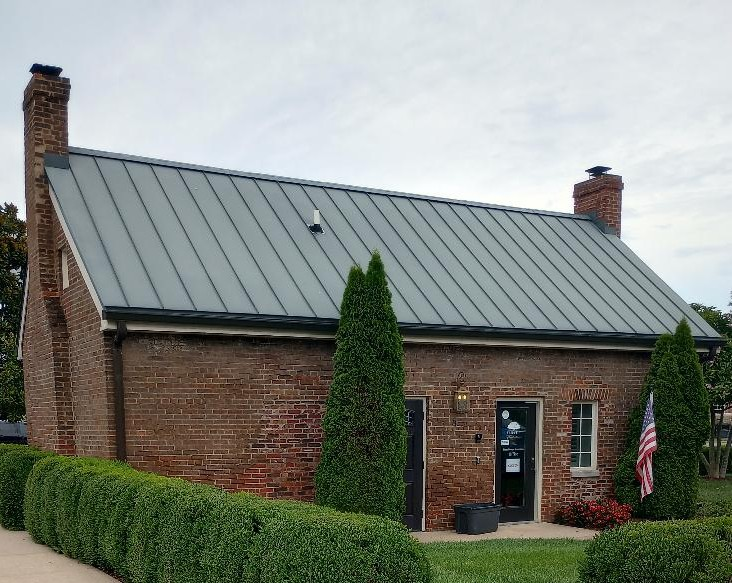
Fairvue Plantation; restored slave quarters; Gallatin, Tennessee

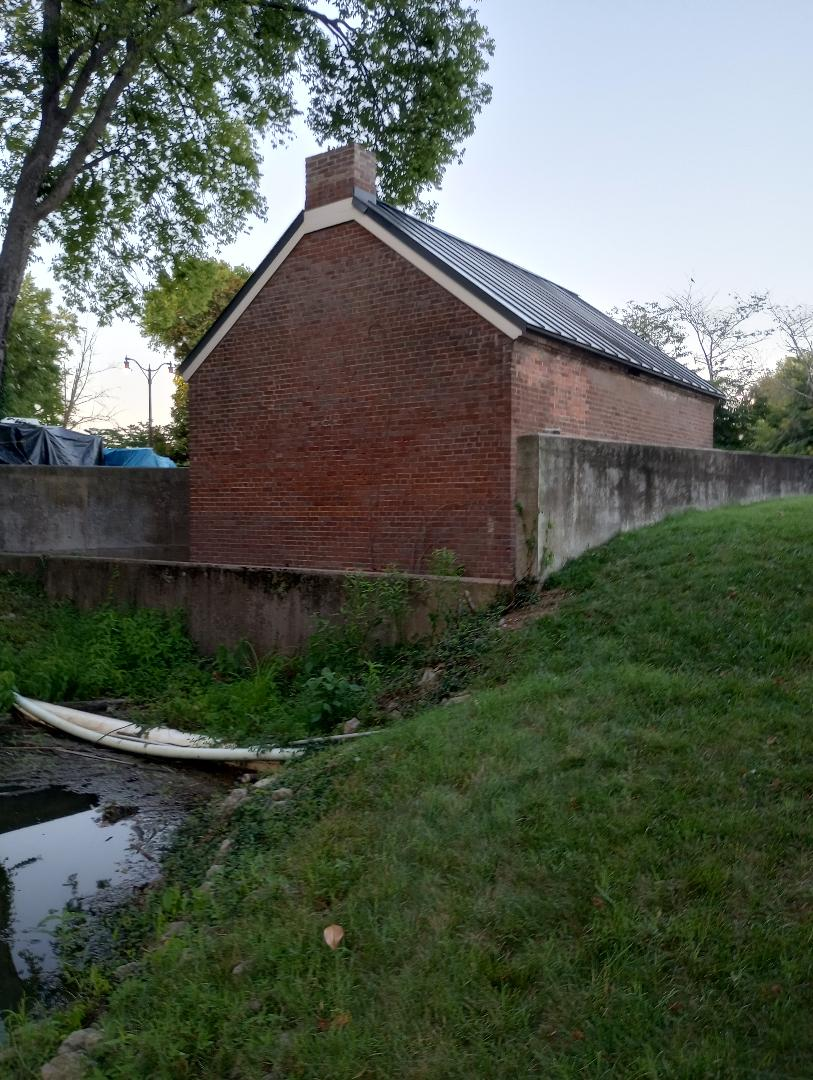
Fairvue Plantation; restored spring house; Gallatin, Tennessee

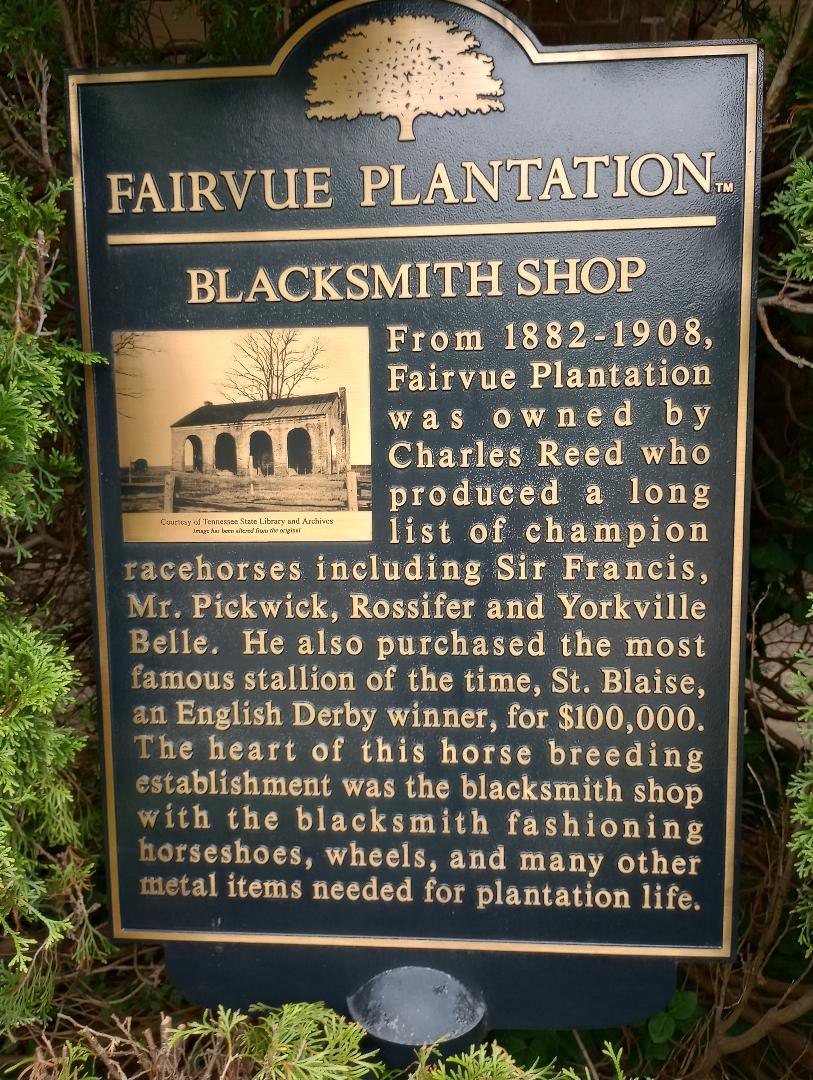
Fairvue Plantation Historic Marker; Blacksmith Shop; Gallatin, Tennessee

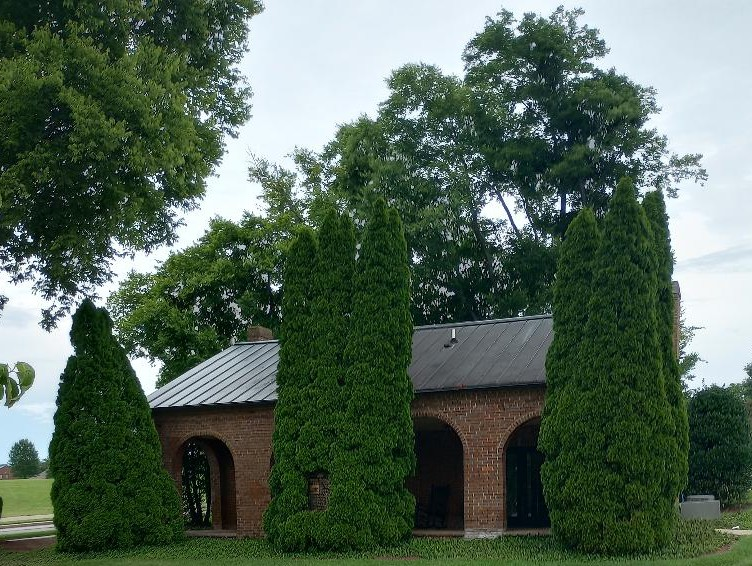
Fairvue Plantation; restored blacksmith shop; Gallatin, Tennessee

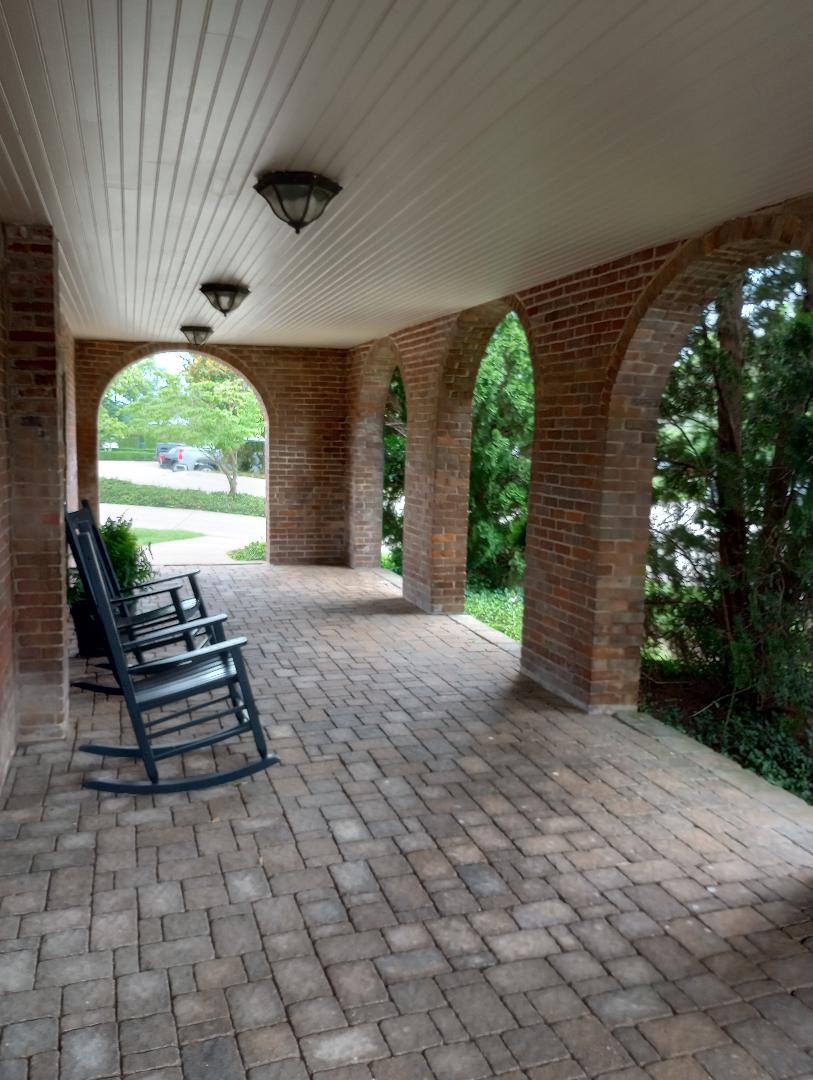
Fairvue Plantation; porch of restored blacksmith shop; Gallatin, Tennessee

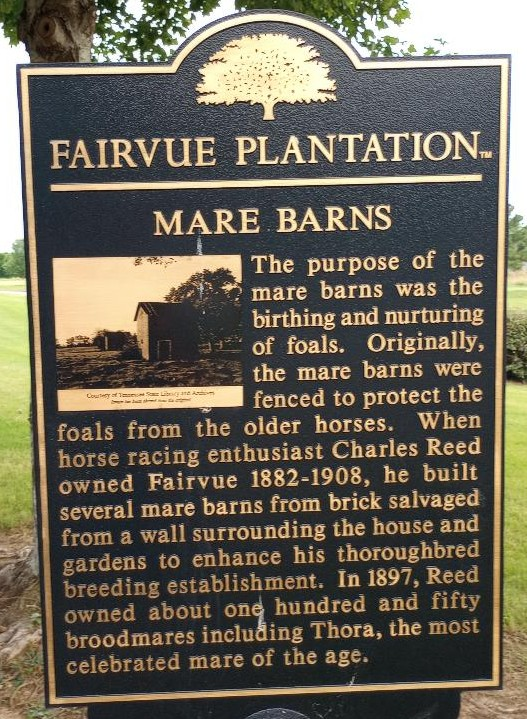
Fairvue Plantation Historic Marker; Mare Barns; Gallatin, Tennessee

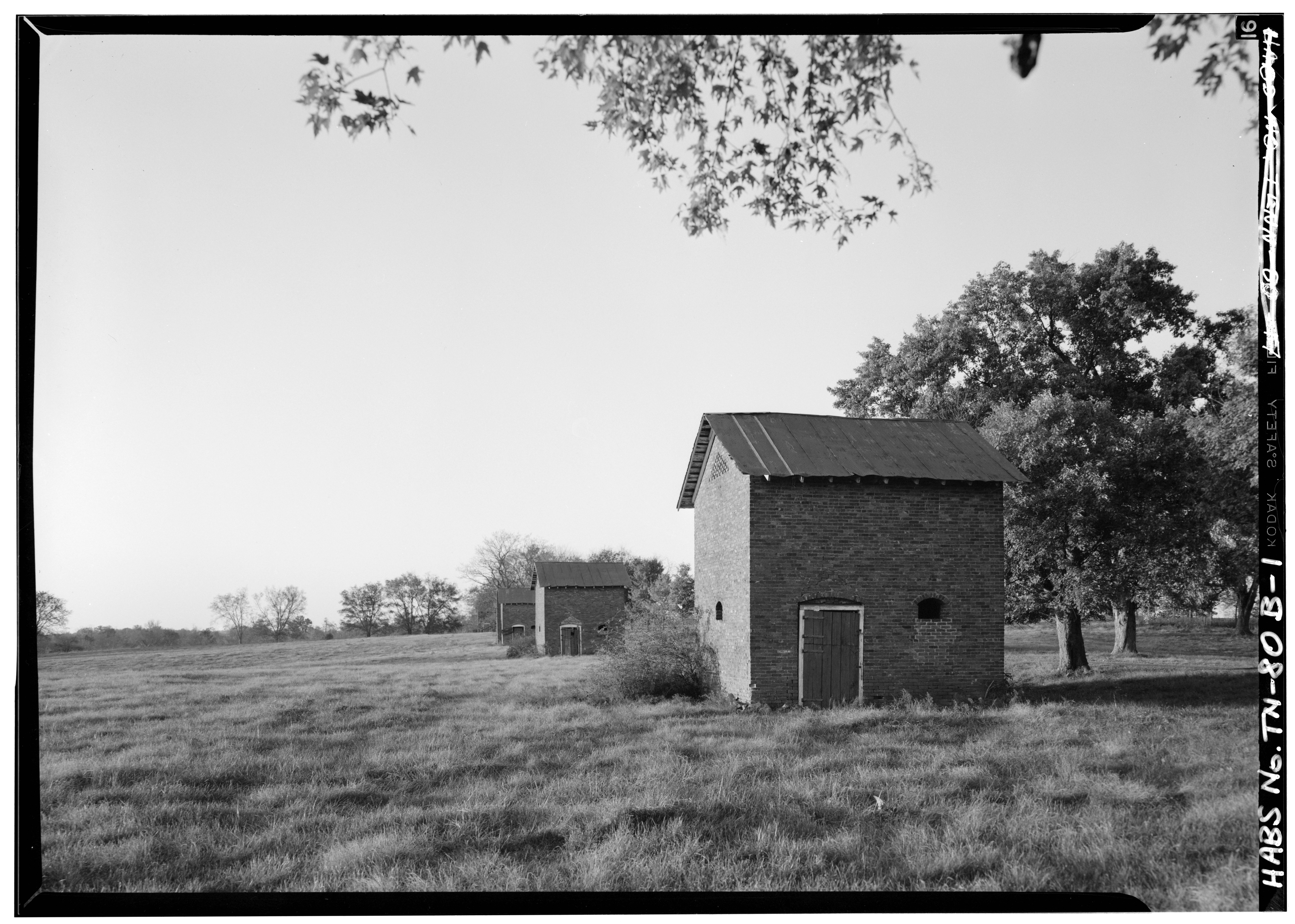
GENERAL VIEW OF MARE BARNS (built in late 19th century) FROM SOUTH - Fairvue, Mare Barns, U.S. Highway 31-E, Gallatin, Sumner County, TN HABS TENN,83-GAL.V,1B-1

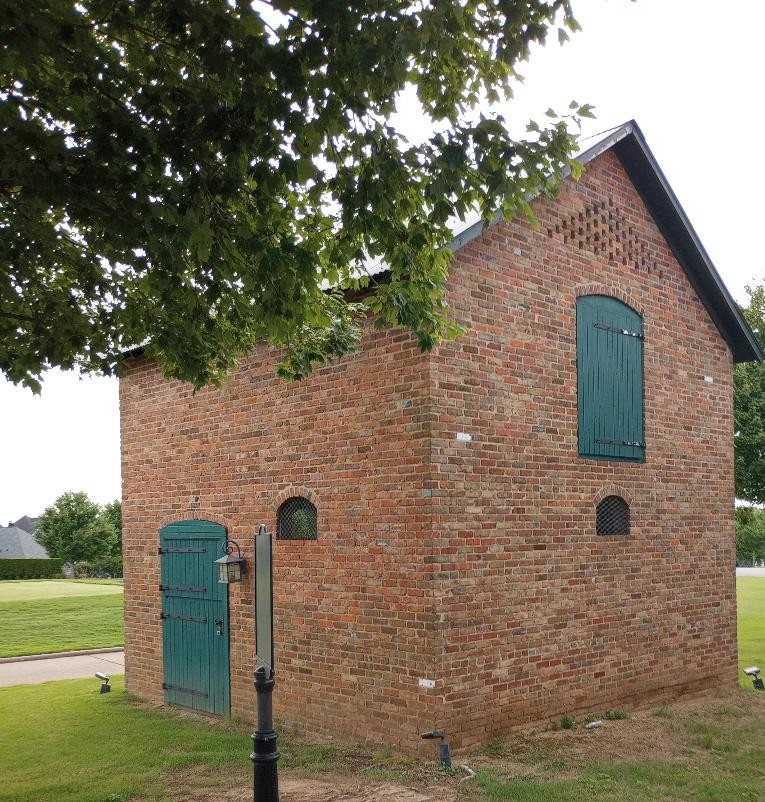
Fairvue Plantation, restored Mare Barn; Gallatin, Tennessee,

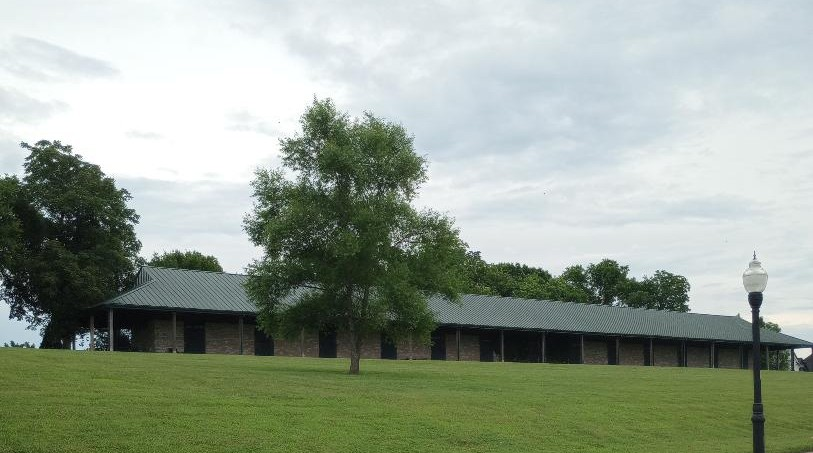
Fairvue Plantation; restored stables; Gallatin, Tennessee

== See also ==
- Belmont Mansion; Nashville, Tennessee
- Louisiana State Penitentiary - formed on Isaac Franklin's Louisiana plantations after his widow Adelica sold them in 1880.
- Franklin and Armfield Office
- Isaac Franklin (brig)
- Landed gentry
- Natchez slave market
