= Ackley =

Ackley may refer to:

- Ackley (surname)
- Ackley, Iowa
- Ackley, Wisconsin
- Ackley Bridge, a British drama television series
