= Chester Bidwell Darrall =

American politician (1842–1908)

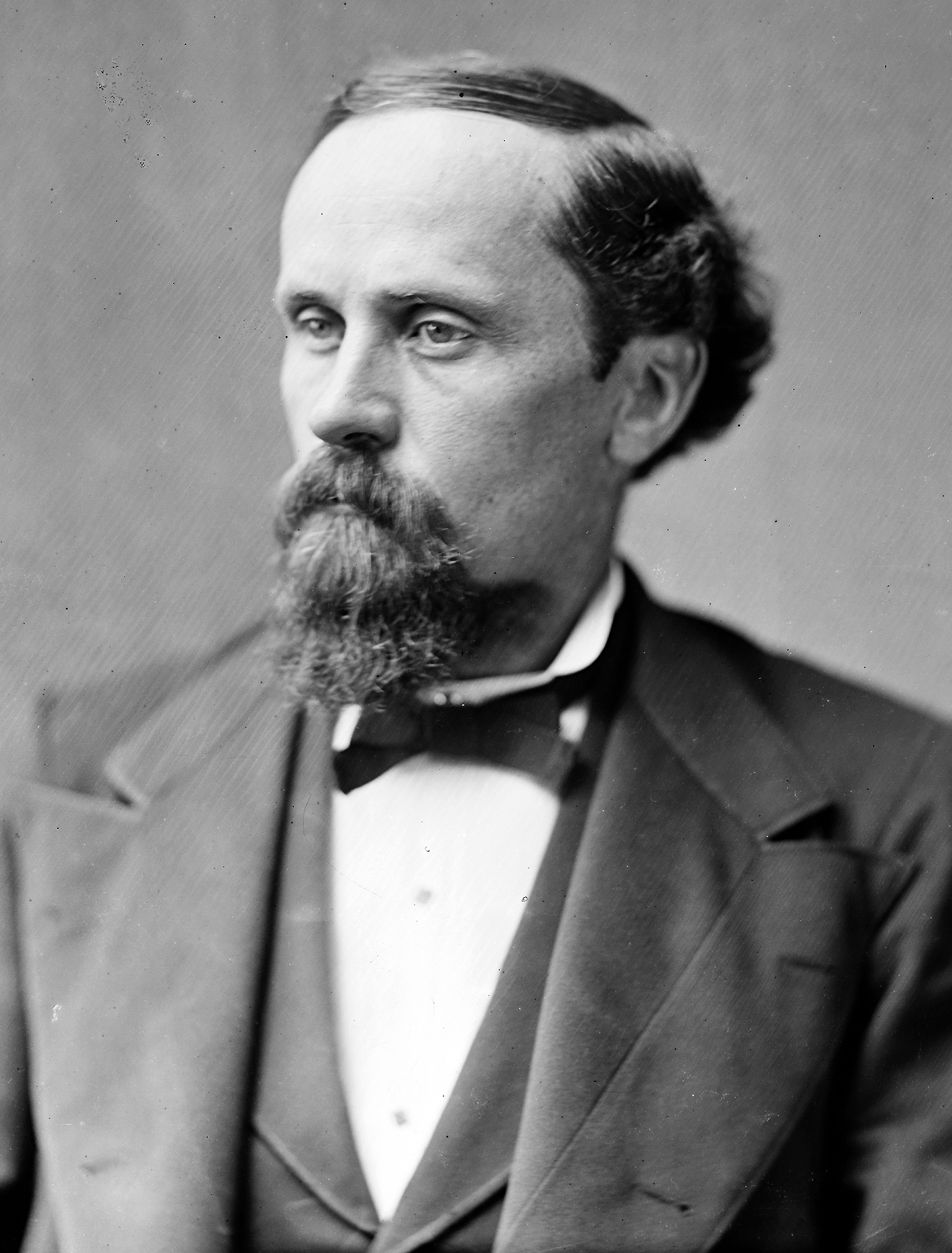
- Darrall, 1865–1880

Member of the U.S. House of Representatives from Louisiana's 3rd district
- In office March 4, 1881 – March 3, 1883
- Preceded by: Joseph H. Acklen
- Succeeded by: William Pitt Kellogg
- In office March 4, 1869 – February 20, 1878
- Preceded by: Joseph P. Newsham
- Succeeded by: Joseph H. Acklen

Louisiana State Senator
- In office 1868–1869

Personal details
- Born: June 24, 1842 Addison, Pennsylvania, U.S.
- Died: January 1, 1908 (aged 65) Washington, D.C., U.S.
- Resting place: Glenwood Cemetery (Washington, D.C.)
- Party: Republican

Chester Bidwell Darrall (June 24, 1842 – January 1, 1908) was an American Republican politician who served as a U.S. representative for Louisiana from 1869 to 1878 and from 1881 to 1883.

== Early life and military service ==
He was born near Addison, Somerset County, Pennsylvania, and attended the common schools. Darrall studied medicine and was graduated from Albany Medical College in New York State. During the Civil War, Dr. Darrall entered the Union Army as assistant surgeon of the Eighty-sixth Regiment, New York Volunteers, and later was promoted to surgeon. While on active duty in Louisiana, Darrall resigned from the Army in 1867 and engaged in mercantile pursuits and planting in Brashear (now Morgan City), Louisiana.

== Political career and later life ==
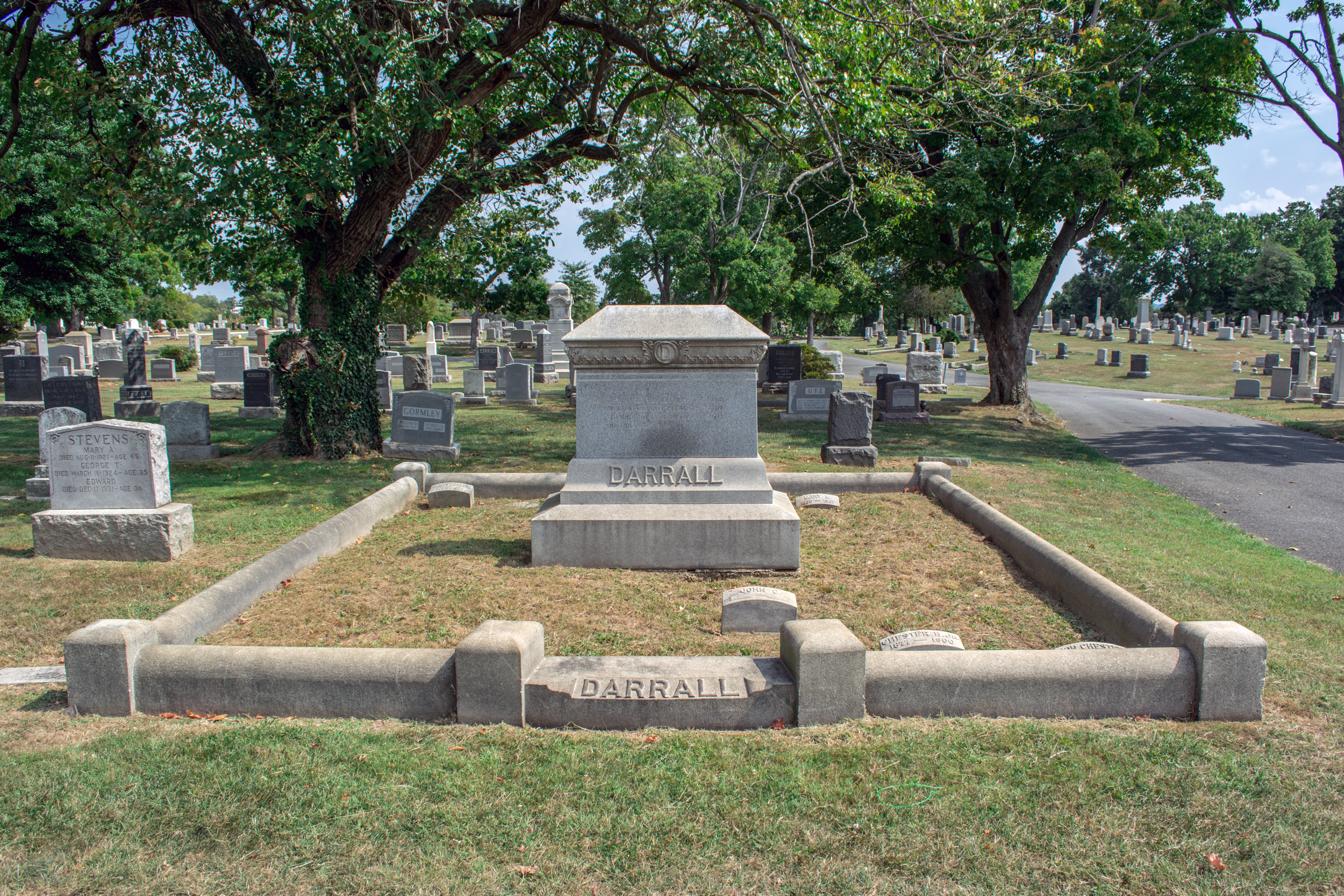
Darrall's plot at Glenwood Cemetery

Darrall was elected a member of the State Senate of Louisiana in 1868. In 1868 Darrall was elected as a Republican to the Forty-first Congress and to the three succeeding Congresses (March 4, 1869 – March 4, 1877). He presented credentials as a member-elect to the Forty-fifth Congress and served in that Congress from March 4, 1877 to February 20, 1878 when he was succeeded by Democrat Joseph H. Acklen, who had successfully contested the election of 1876. Darrall moved back to Morgan City and did not seek nomination the next year. In 1880, he was elected for the final time to Congress, serving from March 4, 1881 to March 4, 1883 (the 47th Congress). He was an unsuccessful candidate for reelection in 1882 to the Forty-eighth Congress, being defeated by fellow Republican William Pitt Kellogg. After his service in Congress, Darrall was appointed by President Chester A. Arthur to be Registrar of the United States Land Office in New Orleans from 1883 to 1885. He ran one final time, unsuccessfully, for Congress in 1888. After that, Darrall moved to Washington, D.C., where he wrote a series of books about combat medicine and surgery. He is interred in Glenwood Cemetery in the District of Columbia.

U.S. House of Representatives
Preceded by Joseph P. Newsham	Member of the U.S. House of Representatives from Louisiana's 3rd congressional district 1869 – 1878	Succeeded by Joseph H. Acklen
Preceded by Joseph H. Acklen	Member of the U.S. House of Representatives from Louisiana's 3rd congressional district 1881 – 1883	Succeeded by William Pitt Kellogg
