= Ackland Art Museum =

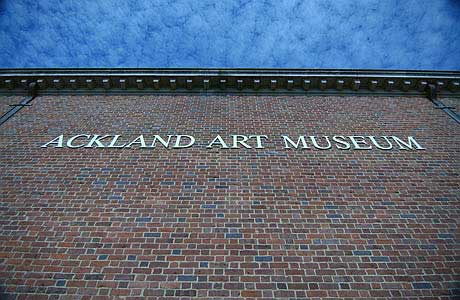

- Shown within North Carolina
- Established: September 20, 1958
- Location: Chapel Hill, North Carolina
- Coordinates: 35.91236°N 79.05443°W
- Type: Art museum
- Directors: Carolyn Allmendinger, interim director and director of education and interpretation
- Curators: Peter Nisbet deputy director for curatorial affairs Dana Cowen Sheldon Peck Curator for European and American Art before 1950; Lauren Turner associate curator for contemporary art and special projects
- Public transit access: Chapel Hill Transit
- Website: www.ackland.org

The Ackland Art Museum is a museum and academic unit of The University of North Carolina at Chapel Hill. It was founded through the bequest of William Hayes Ackland (1855–1940) to The University of North Carolina at Chapel Hill. It is located at 101 S. Columbia Street near the intersection of Franklin Street at the northern edge of campus.

It is free of charge to visitors and offers a wide selection of events related to exhibition, community, and university topics.

== History ==
William Hayes Ackland, a native of Tennessee and an amateur art collector, wanted to leave money in his will to establish an art museum at a Southern university. In a 1936 will, he initially narrowed his choices to Duke University, UNC-Chapel Hill, and Rollins College in Florida, in that order, with UNC receiving the donation if Duke refused it. After a visit to Duke's campus and meetings with the then-eager administration, Ackland decided that only Duke should receive the $1.25 million bequest and removed UNC from his will, with Rollins receiving a much smaller donation. Ackland, who had turned down the chance to attend Harvard College due to family pressure to stay near home, always regretted the decision. Some commentators speculate that he might have viewed Duke as "the Harvard of the South."

Ackland bequeathed Duke his entire fortune on the condition that he be buried within the newly built museum. After Ackland died in 1940, Duke decided the gift had "too many strings attached" and declined it. But three Duke benefactors—all from the Duke family—had already been buried on the Duke campus.

Ackland's nieces and nephews went to court to claim the inheritance for themselves, and Rollins College (represented by former United States Attorney General Homer Cummings) and the University of North Carolina (represented by attorney O. Max Gardner) followed in an attempt by each college to receive the funds for the art museum. The relatives took the case to the United States Supreme Court, arguing that since only Duke had been mentioned in their uncle's will, only Duke could receive the gift. They should receive the money due to Duke's refusal.

Five years after the suit was filed, Ackland's family members lost their case in the Supreme Court. In 1947 a Washington, DC court found that in his final days, Ackland had been more partial to Rollins than UNC; it ruled for Rollins to receive the bequest. But the Ackland trustees had decided that UNC-Chapel Hill should receive the donation, based on both the financial condition of the university and its proximity to Duke. An appeal of the lower court decision resulted in UNC being ruled the recipient of Ackland's bequest (which had grown to $1.4 million) in 1949. Ackland's remains were moved from Mount Olivet cemetery in Nashville and he was reinterred at the museum at UNC.

== Collection ==
The permanent collection at the Ackland holds about 21,000 works, with its most notable regional holdings in Asian art as well as works of art on paper (i.e. prints, photographs, and drawings). The collection also has important holdings of European masterworks, twentieth-century and contemporary art, African art, and North Carolina pottery. Artists in the collection include Eugène Delacroix, Albrecht Dürer, Jean-Honoré Fragonard, Käthe Kollwitz, Pablo Picasso, Salvador Dali, and Max Weber.

In 2024 the museum restituted the painting L'atelier du Maître / The Master's workshop to the heirs of Armand Dorville, a French Jewish art collector whose family was murdered in the Holocaust.

Select gallery

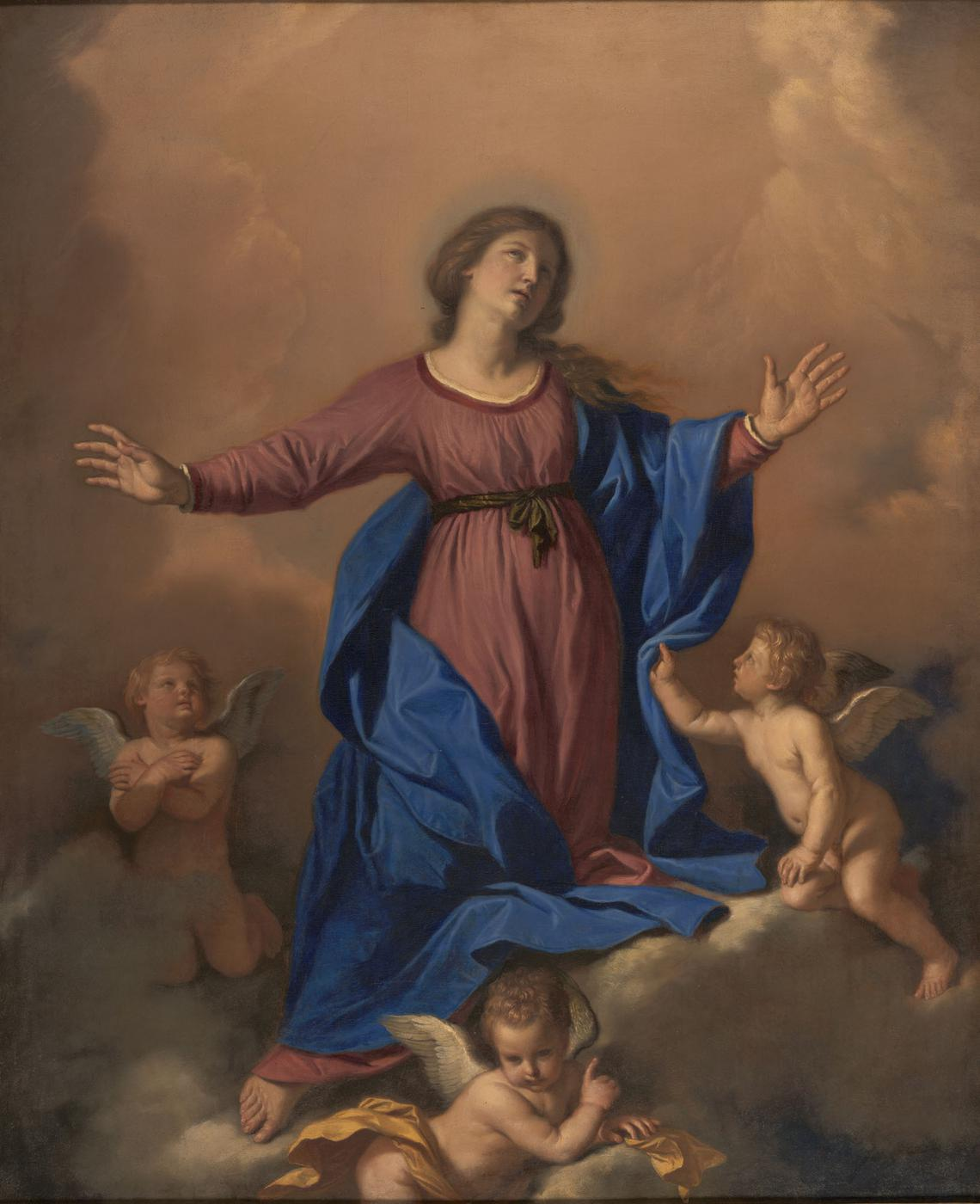
Guercino, Assumption of the Virgin

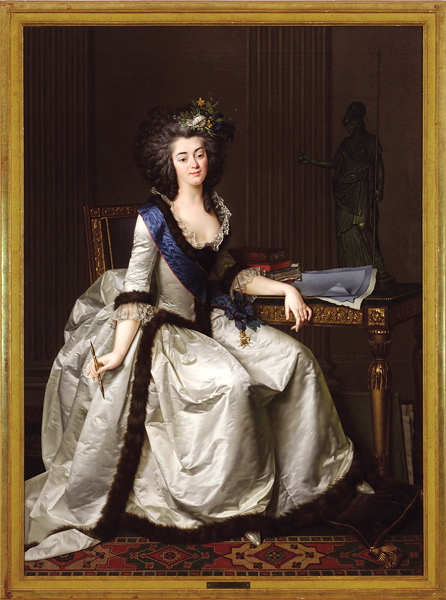
Jean-Louis Le Barbier, portrait of Mélanie de Forbin-Gardanne, Marquise de Villeneuve-Flayosc (1759-1841)

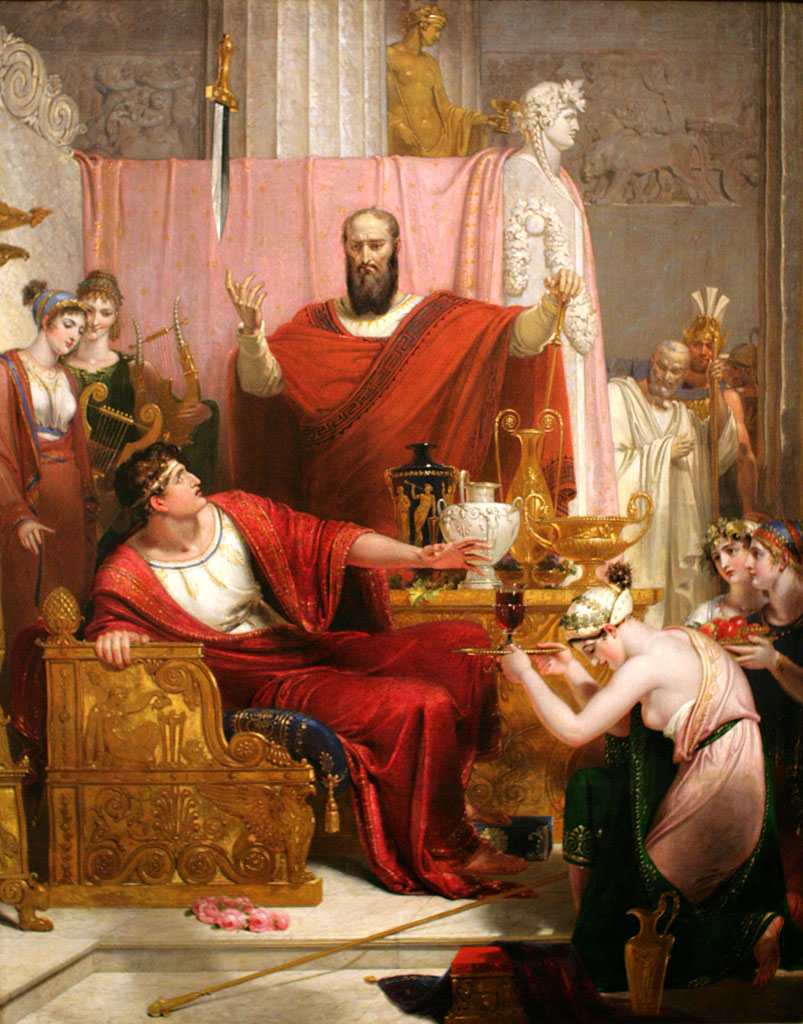
Richard Westall's Sword of Damocles (1812)

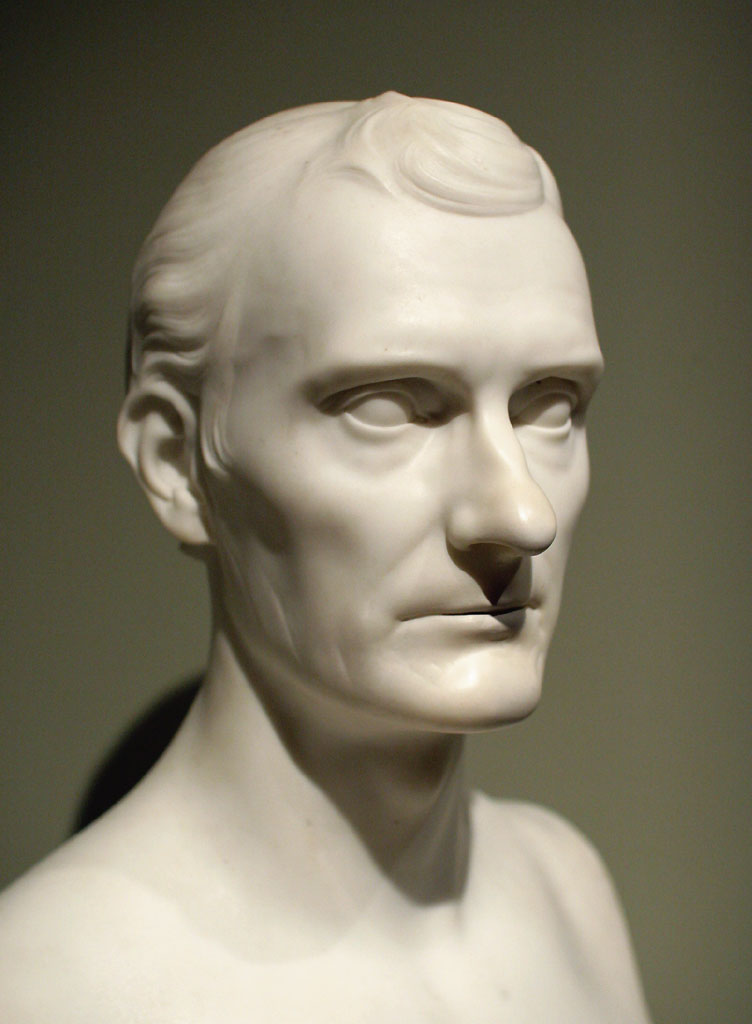
Hiram Powers, Duff Greene, marble sculpture (1834-1837)

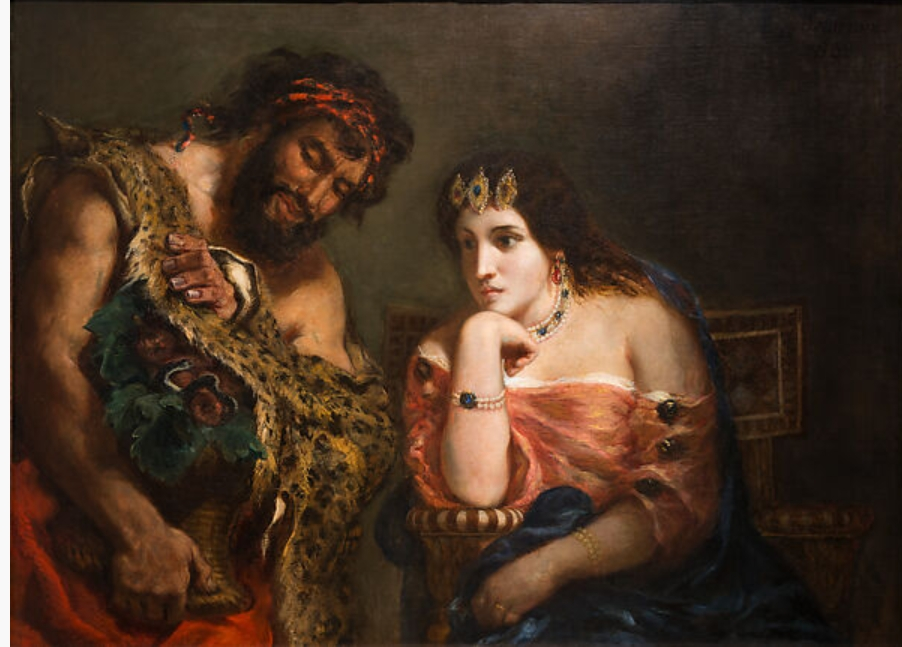
Eugène Delacroix, Cleopatra and the Peasant (1838)

== See also ==
- List of places named after people
