= Adelicia Acklen =

American planter and slave trader (1817–1887)

- Born: Adelicia Hayes; March 15, 1817; Nashville, Tennessee, US
- Died: May 4, 1887 (aged 70); New York City, US
- Resting place: Mount Olivet Cemetery
- Occupations: Planter, socialite
- Spouses: Isaac Franklin; Joseph Alexander Smith Acklen; William Archer Cheatham
- Children: 10, including Joseph H. Acklen and William Hayes Ackland
- Relatives: Richard Cheatham (third father-in-law); Sarah Ewing Sims Carter Gaut (cousin)

Adelicia Hayes Franklin Acklen Cheatham (March 15, 1817 – May 4, 1887) was an American planter and slave trader. She became the wealthiest woman in Tennessee and a plantation owner in her own right after the 1846 death of her first husband, Isaac Franklin. As a successful slave trader, she had used his wealth to purchase numerous plantations, lands, and slaves in Tennessee and Louisiana.

In 1880 Acklen sold four contiguous plantations in Louisiana as one property. These formed the grounds of the Louisiana State Penitentiary (also known as "Angola" after one of the plantations) since 1901.

When married to her second husband, Joseph Alexander Smith Acklen, Adelicia Acklen built the Belmont Mansion in Nashville, Tennessee. She sold the property in 1887; it was converted for use as a girls' school and later a junior college campus. It operates as a museum at the center of what became Belmont University.

== Early life ==
Adelicia Hayes was born in Nashville, Tennessee. Her parents were Northerners: her father was Oliver Bliss Hayes, a lawyer and later Presbyterian minister from South Hadley, Massachusetts. He was related to Rutherford B. Hayes, the 19th President of the United States from 1877 to 1881. Her mother was Sarah Clements (Hightower) Hayes. They lived at Rokeby in Nashville, now the name of a neighborhood.

== Adult life ==
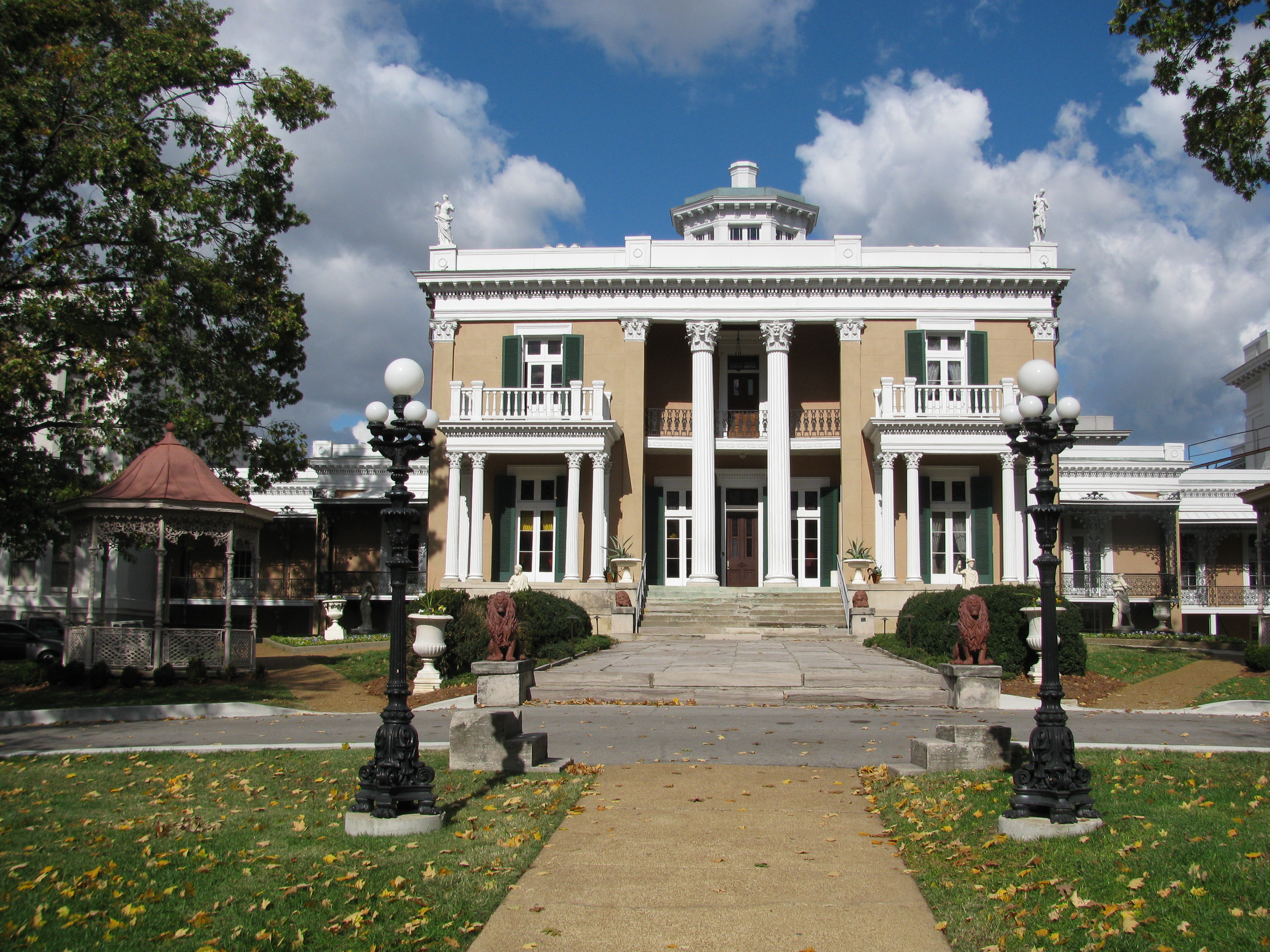
The Belmont Mansion

In 1839, at age 22, Hayes married Isaac Franklin, a wealthy, prominent 50-year-old slave trader and planter. He started fully concentrating on his plantations by 1841, mostly in Louisiana. The couple had four children together: Victoria (1840–1846), Adelicia (1842–1846), Julius Caesar (1844–1844), and Emma Franklin (1844–1855), none of whom survived early childhood.

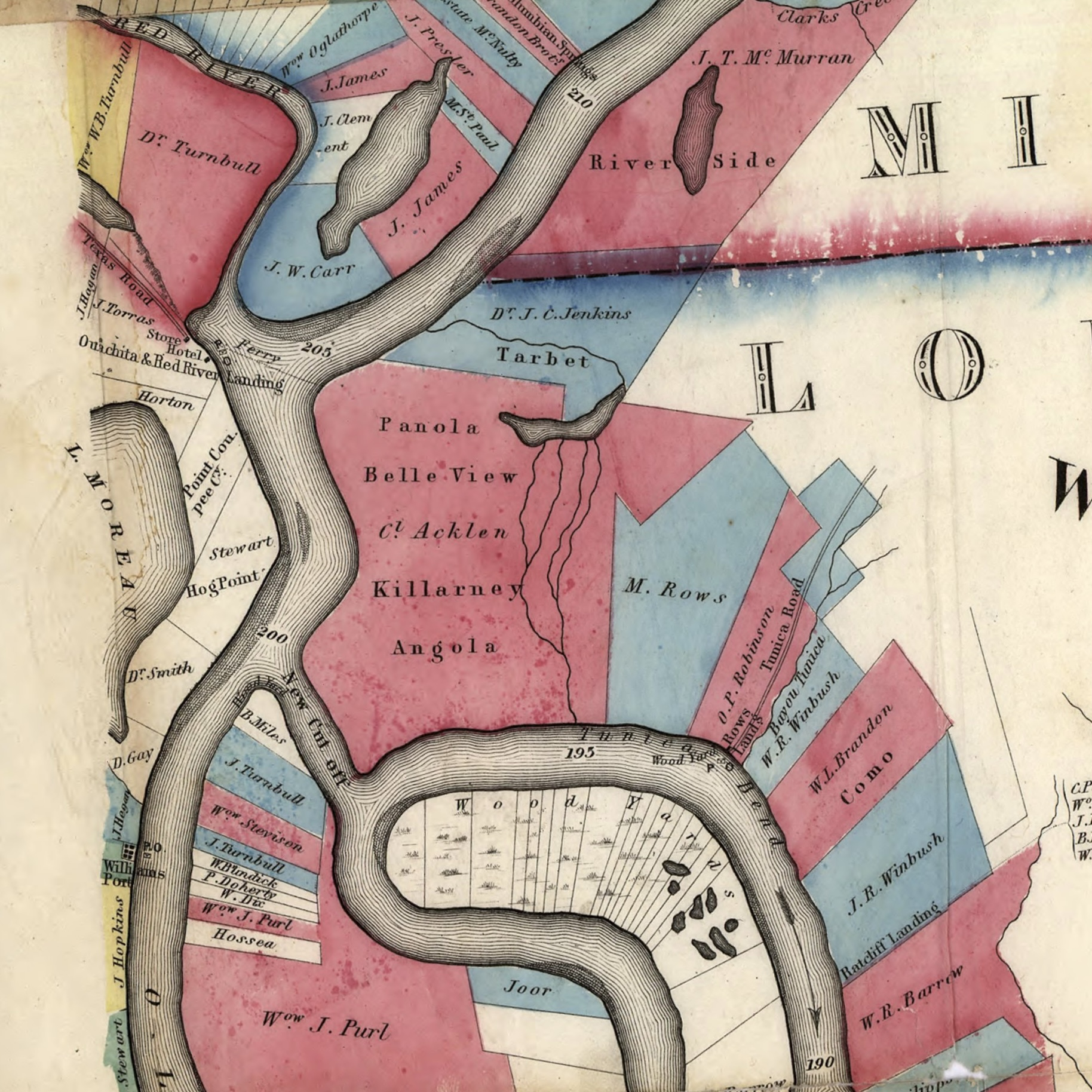
Map of Acklen's Panola, Belle View, Killarney, and Angola plantations in Louisiana in 1858

In 1846, Franklin died, and Adelicia Franklin inherited the Fairvue Plantation in Gallatin, Tennessee; 8,700 acres (35 km^{2}) in four cotton plantations in Louisiana; more than 50,000 acres (200 km^{2}) of undeveloped land in Texas; stocks and bonds, and 750 enslaved African Americans, who had high value in the South. The widow Franklin became the wealthiest woman in Tennessee.

In 1849, the widow Franklin married a second time, to Joseph Alexander Smith Acklen (1816–1863). Together, they built the Belmont Mansion outside Nashville for use as a summer estate, complete with gardens and a zoo. They had six children; two daughters died young, Laura (1852–1855) and Corinne (1852–1855). The others made careers and families: Joseph H. Acklen (1850–1938) became a politician and served as U.S. Representative from Louisiana; William Hayes Ackland (1855–1940) was an attorney, writer and art collector; Claude M. Acklen (1857–1920), and Pauline (1859–1931) married a Mr. Lockett.

Joseph A. S. Acklen died in 1863. Later, Adelicia Acklen married Dr. William Archer Cheatham (1820–1900), a physician and head of the Tennessee State Insane Asylum. His father, Richard Cheatham (1799–1845), had served one term as United States Representative from Tennessee.

But Acklen soon grew dissatisfied with this marriage and moved to Washington, D. C. There she lived at 1776 Massachusetts Avenue.

In 1887, Acklen Cheatham sold the Belmont Mansion in Nashville. It was later used as a girls academy and then for Ward–Belmont College (which eventually developed into Belmont University).

Acklen had leased and then sold the plantations in Louisiana in 1880. In 1901, the state bought four of them, including the one known as Angola. This became the nickname of the Louisiana State Penitentiary that was developed on these lands, where prisoners worked the fields for commodity and sustenance crops.

== Death ==
Acklen died on a shopping trip in New York City on May 4, 1887, at the age of seventy. She was buried at the Mount Olivet Cemetery in Nashville, Tennessee.
