= Joseph H. Acklen =

American politician (1850–1938)

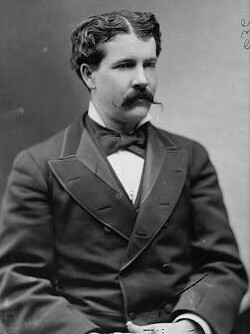

Member of the U.S. House of Representatives from Louisiana's 3rd district
- In office February 20, 1878 – March 4, 1881
- Preceded by: Chester Bidwell Darrall
- Succeeded by: Chester Bidwell Darrall

Personal details
- Born: Joseph Hayes Acklen; May 20, 1850 Nashville, Tennessee, United States
- Died: September 28, 1938 (aged 88) Nashville, Tennessee, United States
- Resting place: Mount Olivet Cemetery
- Party: Democratic
- Parent(s): Joseph Alexander Smith Acklen; Adelicia Acklen
- Relatives: William Hayes Ackland (brother)
- Education: Burlington Military College; École de Neuilly; Swiss University; Cumberland School of Law
- Occupation: Politician

Joseph Hayes Acklen (May 20, 1850 – September 28, 1938) was an American lawyer, plantation owner and politician who served two terms as a U.S. representative from Louisiana from 1878 to 1881.

== Early life ==
Joseph Hayes Acklen was born in Nashville, Tennessee, to Adelicia and Joseph Alexander Smith Acklen, a wealthy couple whose summer home was located in Nashville, while he also grew up on plantations in Louisiana. He had a brother, William Hayes Ackland.

=== Civil War ===
During the American Civil War, his parents sided with the Confederacy, and the father fled to the family's Louisiana plantation, where he died in 1863.

=== Education ===
He was educated by private tutors. He attended Burlington Military College, near Burlington, New Jersey, in 1864 and 1865, and graduated from two foreign institutions (École de Neuilly, Paris, and Swiss University, Vevey). He returned to the United States and graduated from Cumberland University's law school in Lebanon, Tennessee in 1871.

== Career ==
He began practicing law in Nashville and later practiced in Memphis, Tennessee, but abandoned the practice of law and moved to Louisiana to superintend the family's sugar plantations near Pattersonville (now Patterson) in Saint Mary Parish.

He served as colonel in the Louisiana Militia in 1876.

=== Congress ===
In November of that year, claiming voting fraud, he and other Democrats objected to the reelection of Republican Chester Bidwell Darrall to represent Louisiana's 3rd congressional district; after protracted settlement of the various controversies surrounding the 1876 presidential election, on February 20, 1878, Darrall left the seat and was replaced by Acklen, for the remaining half of the Forty-fifth Congress. Acklen was reelected, to the Forty-sixth Congress, and served from 20 February 1878 to 4 March 1881. He was not a candidate for renomination in 1880, and Darrall regained the seat for one term (the Forty-seventh Congress).

He was an unsuccessful candidate for election in 1882 to the Forty-eighth Congress.

== Later career ==
On leaving Congress, he declined an appointment by President Rutherford B. Hayes to be a judge on the Federal district court of Louisiana and instead resumed the practice of law, in Franklin, Louisiana.

He returned to Nashville, in 1885 and continued the practice of law. He served as chairman of the Democratic executive committee of Davidson County, Tennessee from 1886 to 1894. He served as member of the Nashville City Council from 1900 to 1904. He then served as president of the Tennessee State bar association in 1901 and 1902. He served as general insurance counsel of Tennessee from 1903 to 1907. He was State warden of the Tennessee department of game, fish, and forestry from 1903 to 1913. He served as general counsel of the National Association of Game and Fish Commissioners of the United States from 1905 to 1912, when he was elected president of the Association. He was Middle Tennessee counsel for the St. Louis & San Francisco Railroad from 1907 to 1911.

From 1913 to 1914, he served under Democrat U.S. President Woodrow Wilson as chief game warden of the United States. Acklen was author of numerous articles on ornithology, fish culture, forestry, and field sports. He served as chairman of the State central committee on the Tennessee constitutional convention from 1923 to 1927.

== Death and legacy ==
He died in Nashville on September 28, 1938. He is interred there in Mount Olivet Cemetery. His family's Nashville property, the Belmont Mansion and its grounds, now forms a large part of the campus of Belmont University, where the home continues as a museum. It is on the National Register of Historic Places.

U.S. House of Representatives
Preceded by Chester Bidwell Darrall	Member of the U.S. House of Representatives from Louisiana's 3rd congressional district February 20, 1878 – March 4, 1881	Succeeded by Chester Bidwell Darrall
