= Belmont Mansion (Tennessee) =

Historic house in Tennessee, United States

- Belmont
- U.S. National Register of Historic Places
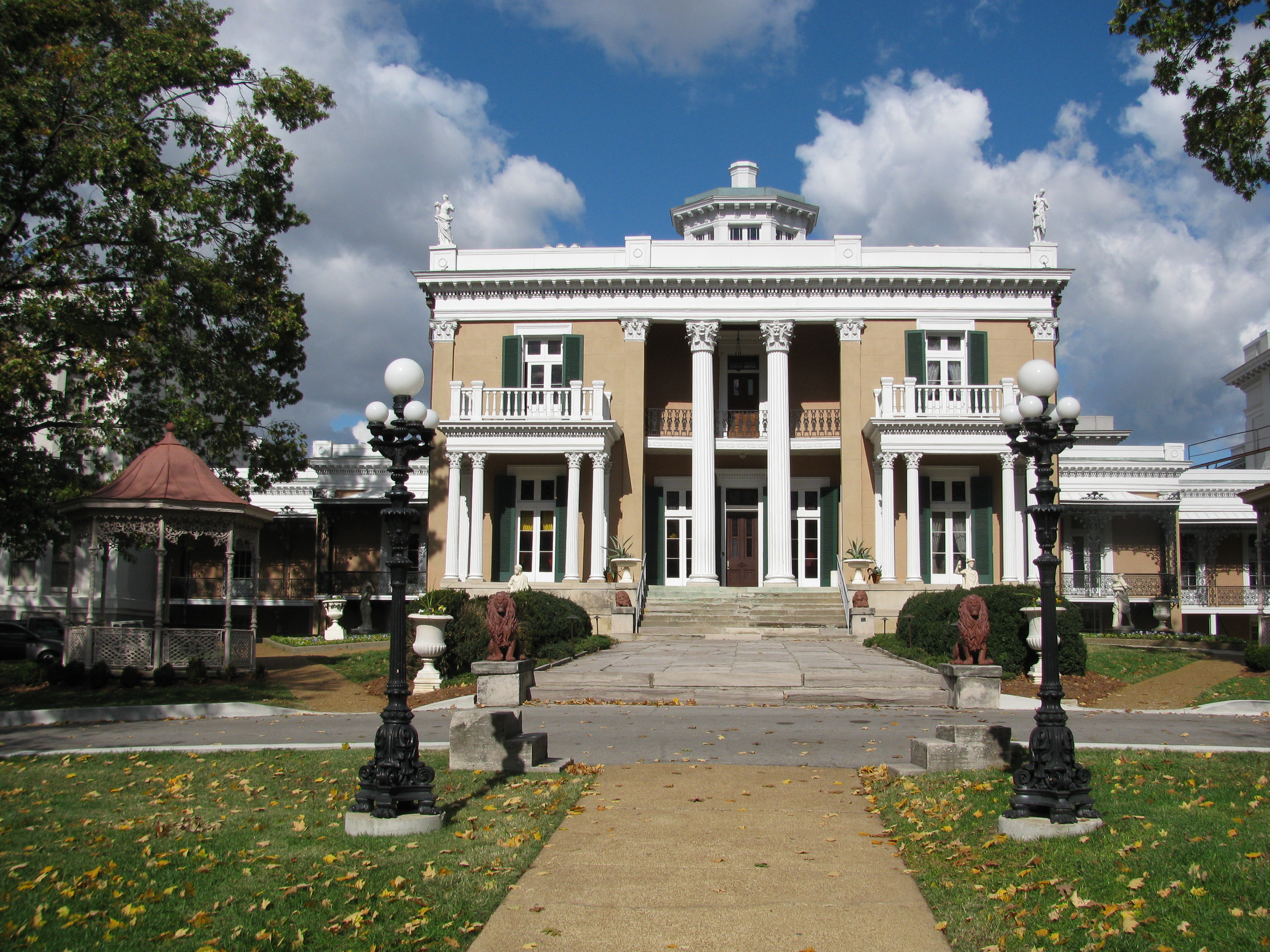
- Belmont Mansion

- Location within Tennessee Location within the United States
- Location: 1900 Belmont Boulevard; Nashville, Tennessee
- Coordinates: 36°8′9″N 86°47′41″W
- Built: 1849–1853
- Architect: William Strickland or Adolphus Heiman
- Architectural style: Greek Revival, Italianate
- NRHP reference No.: 71000816
- Added to NRHP: May 6, 1971

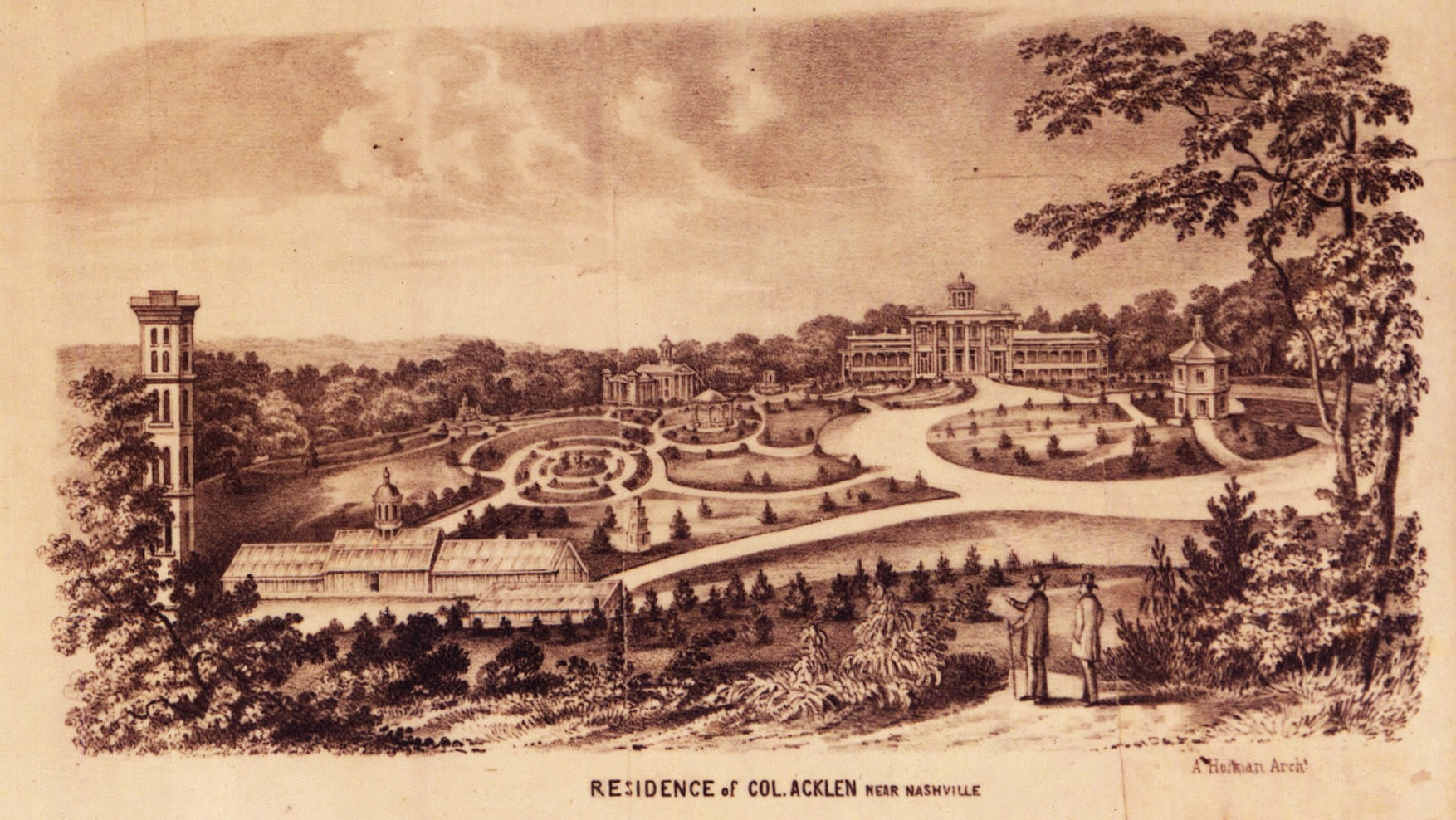
The Belmont Estate - Residence of Col. Acklen near Nashville, Tennessee (1860)

Belmont Mansion, also known as Acklen Hall, and originally known as Belle Monte, Belle Mont or Belmont, is a historic mansion located in Nashville, Tennessee. It was built with the profits of slavery by Joseph and Adelicia Acklen to serve as the center of their 180-acre summer estate in what was then country outside the city, and featured elaborate gardens and a zoo. They lived much of the rest of the year on her plantations in Louisiana.

The estate was sold in the late 19th century and since 1890 has been used for educational functions. It was first used as a girls academy, then as the first building of what became Belmont College and now Belmont University. Today it is operated as a museum. It was listed on the National Register of Historic Places in 1971.

== History ==
After the 1846 death of her husband Isaac Franklin, Adelicia (Hayes) Franklin had been left provided for until such time as she remarried. Once Adelicia remarried the estate plan instructed that Isaac's adjoining Louisiana cotton plantations, which included Adelicia's home on Angola Plantation, would eventually fund a school to be set up on Isaac and Adelicia's summer home at Fairvue Plantation (Gallatin, Tennessee).

Adelicia remarried to Joseph Alexander Smith Acklen in 1849. She was able to get her inheritance changed. Instead of losing all of her former husband's plantations, she got all of his Louisiana Plantations, but not his summer home - Fairvue Plantation in Tennessee. Thus, the now very rich Adelicia began construction of a new summer home named Belle Monte (Belmont) on 180 acres (73 ha) in Davidson County, Tennessee. Belmont was completed by 1853 as an Italian villa-style home. Adelicia and Joseph lived the rest of the year on Angola Plantation in Louisiana, just as Adelicia and her previous husband Isaac had done. Angola adjoined her six other Louisiana cotton plantations, which combined totalled 8,600 acres (3,500 ha).

At Belmont Mansion, the Acklens built, furnished, and landscaped one of the most elaborate antebellum homes in the South, totaling 36 rooms and 19,000 sq ft (1,800 m^{2}). The estate contained a variety of buildings, with the house situated at the top of the hill. Covered balconies with cast iron railing and trim surrounded the house to protect windows from the sun. Atop the house, a ten-foot octagonal cupola vented the house during the summer months. It was also used as an "astronomical observatory" used for viewing the stars, the estate and downtown Nashville.

Beside the house, there was a T-shaped guest house and art gallery. The south wing of the guest house contained guestrooms and a bowling alley. The art gallery had a corrugated glass roof and comprised the north wing.

The grounds included lavish gardens, conservatories, aviary, lake and a zoo. The conservatories housed tropical fruit and flowers, along with camellia japonica, jasmine, lilies, and cacti. The zoo featured bears, monkeys, peacocks, singing birds, a white owl, alligators from Louisiana, and a deer park.

Adelicia with her horse Bucephalus.

Joseph and Adelicia had six children together, but their twins died of scarlet fever at the age of 2 in 1855. In 1863, Joseph died in Louisiana, where he was supervising their plantations during the American Civil War. Adelicia secretly negotiated agreements with Union and Confederate authorities to allow 2,800 bales of her cotton to be shipped to Liverpool, England, and sold for a total of $758,000.

As Union and Confederate forces marshalled for the Battle of Nashville in December 1864, Union General Thomas J. Wood encamped 13,000 troops on the mansion's grounds for two weeks. Some damage was done to the grounds, but Belmont Mansion and its contents survived the Civil War unscathed.

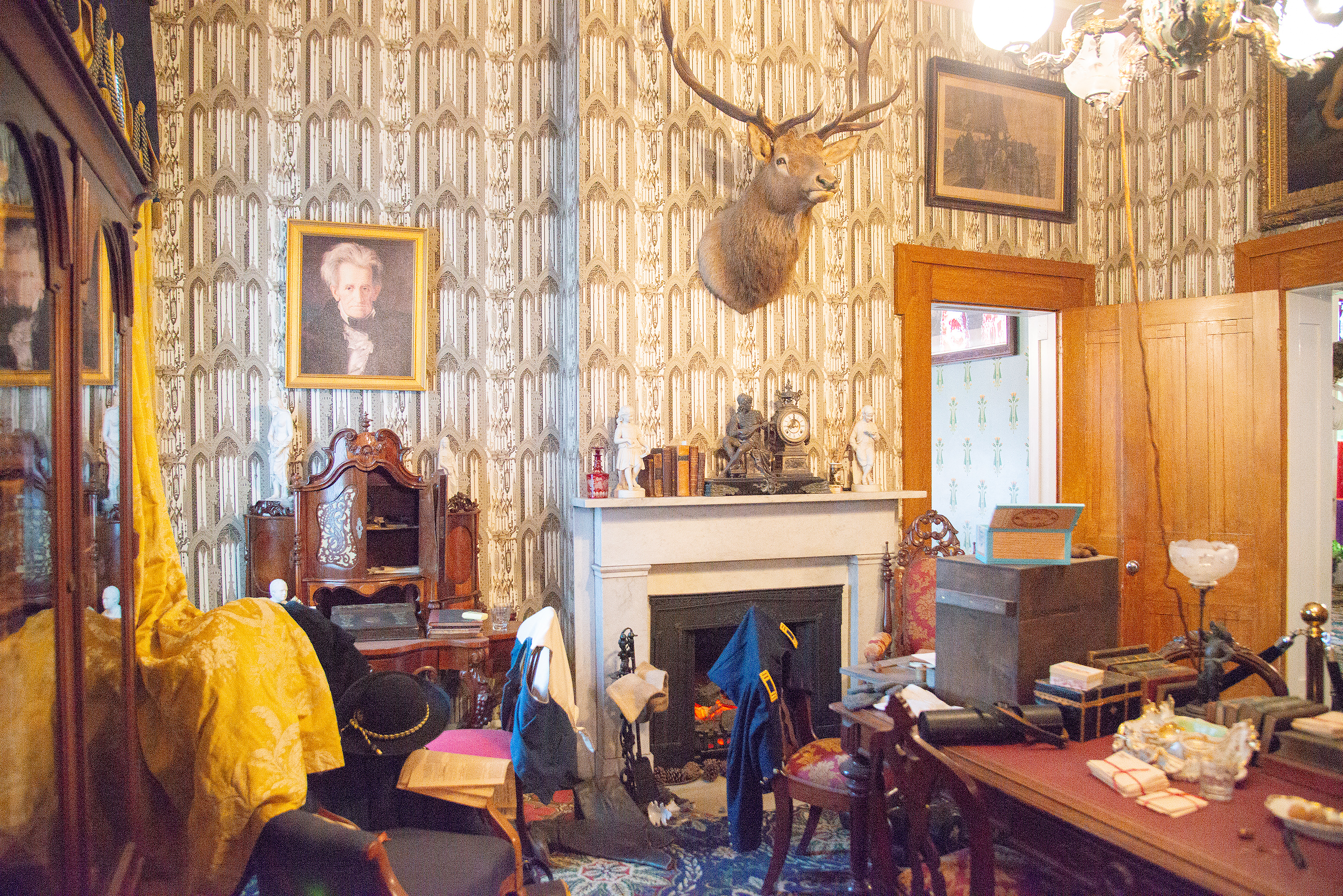
The library with Union uniforms on some chairs (as in 1864)

Immediately following the war, Adelicia and her four surviving children traveled to Europe to collect the $758,000 for the sale of her cotton. Thus, although her source of income - the enslaved plantation workers in Louisiana - was lost, Adelicia now had enough wealth to last the rest of her life. While in Europe, she continued amassing her large art collection, including five major marble statues by the most important American sculptors who were working in Rome. These included works by Randolph Rogers, William Henry Rinehart, Joseph Mozier, and Chauncey Ives. Four of these pieces remain in the mansion today. In France, Adelicia was presented at the Court of Emperor Louis Napoleon and his wife Empress Eugénie.

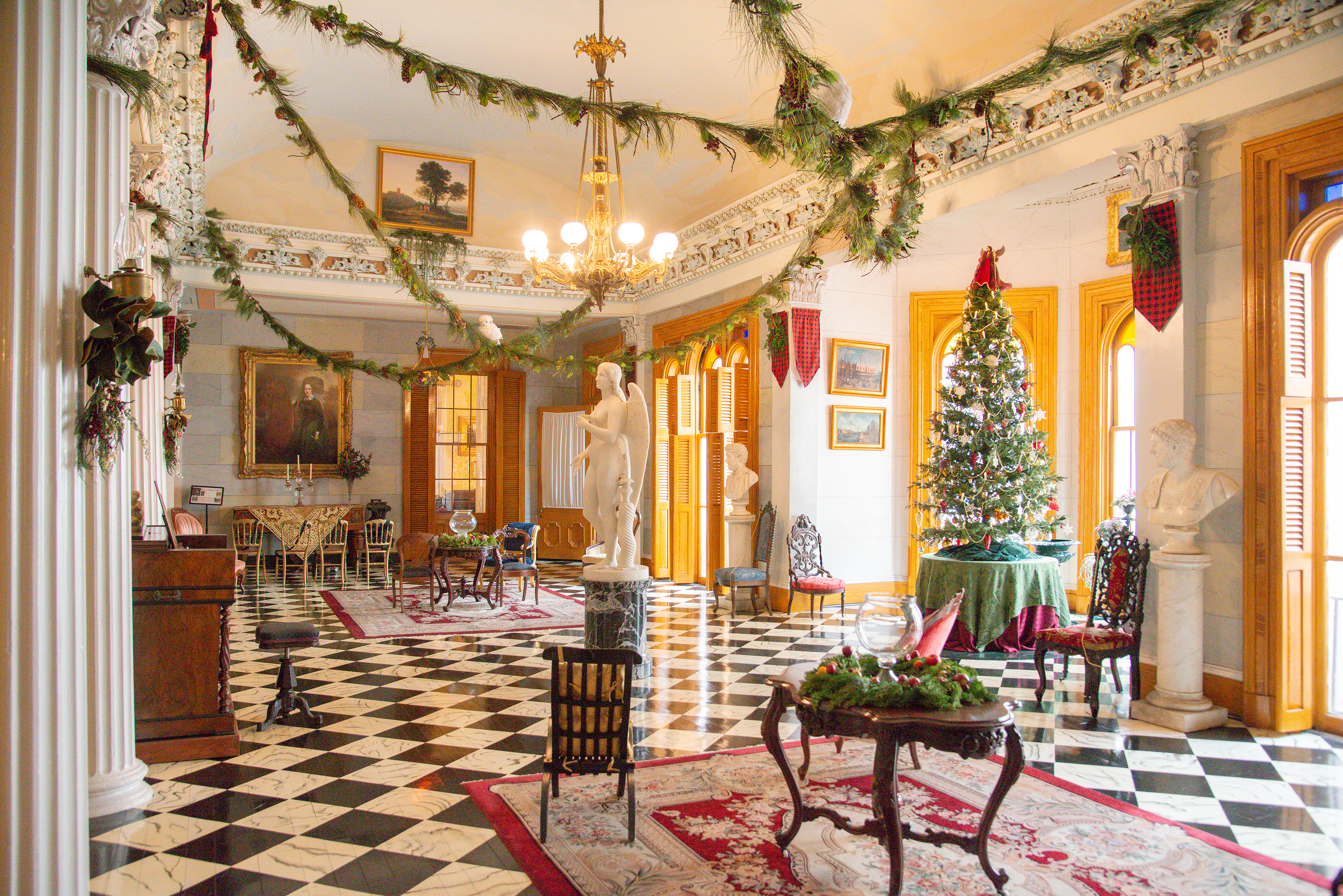
Grand Salon, decorated for Christmas; after the 2019 restoration

Months before her death, Adelicia sold Belmont and the surrounding land to Lewis T. Baxter for around $54,000. It was adapted and in 1890 opened as a women's academy and junior college. The school merged with Ward's Seminary in 1913 and was renamed Ward-Belmont. The Tennessee Baptist Convention purchased the school in 1951, and developed a four-year, coeducational college, Belmont College.

It was developed as a university offering graduate programs and, in 2007, Belmont University separated from the Tennessee Baptist Convention. Today the mansion is owned by the Belmont Mansion Association and Belmont University. It is operated and preserved by the Belmont Mansion Association.

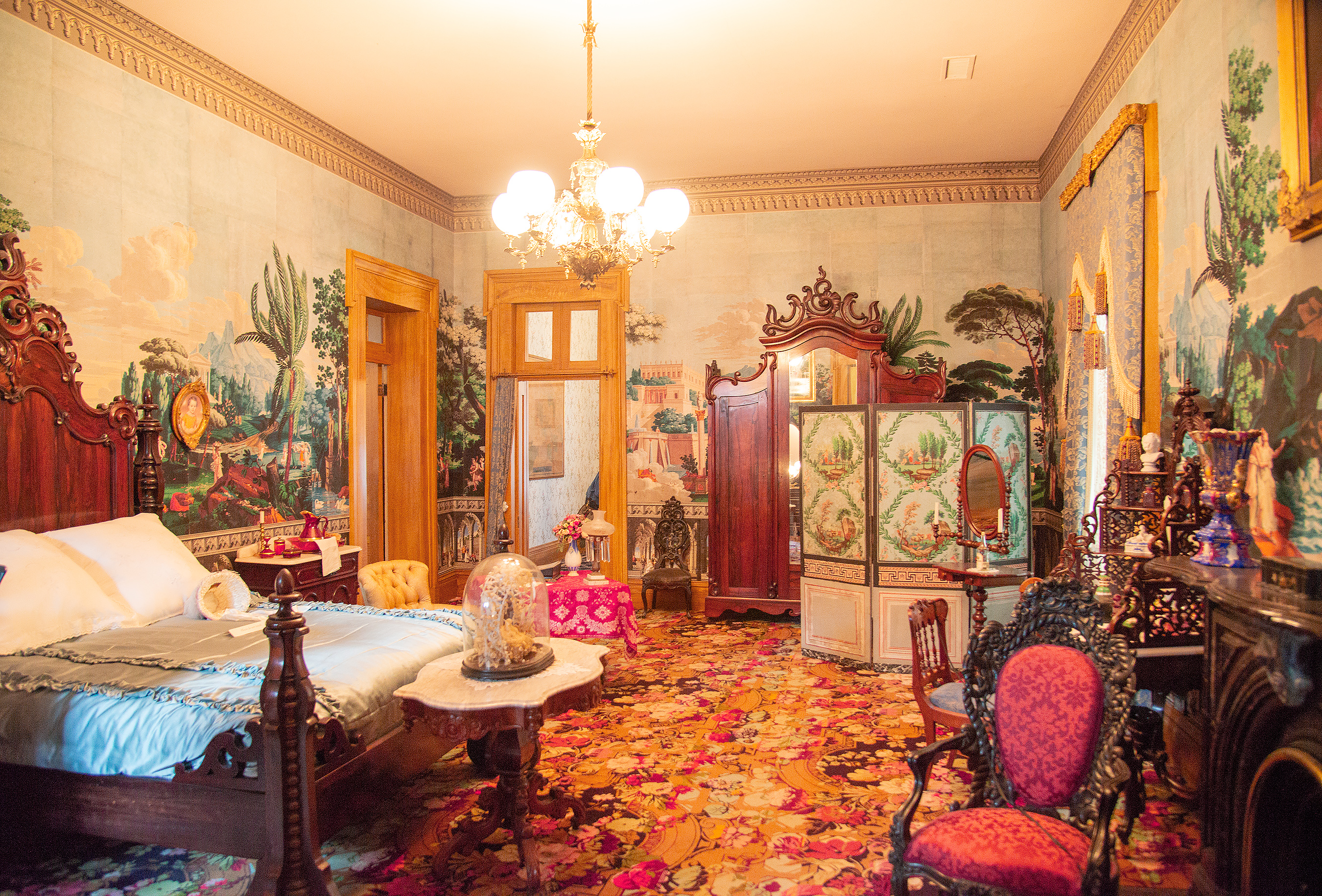
Principal Bedroom; after the 2013 restoration

Gilt frame mirrors hang over marble mantels, reflecting the elaborate gasoliers and elegantly furnished parlors. Much of the original Venetian glass still adorns the windows, doors, and transoms of Belmont. The Grand Salon is considered by architectural historians to be the most elaborate domestic interior built in antebellum Tennessee. Now maintained as part of the university campus, the gardens contain five cast iron gazebos. The 105-foot (32 m) water tower remains on the grounds and today serves as a Bell Tower for Belmont University.

Many notable visitors to the home include Mrs. James K. Polk, William Walker, Agustín de Iturbide, Dwight L. Moody, Thomas Huxley, and Octavia Walton Le Vert.

The Belmont Mansion was listed on the National Register of Historic Places in 1971.

== See also ==
- Fairvue Plantation (Gallatin, Tennessee) - Adelica Franklin Acklen's summer residence before the Belmont estate was created
- Louisiana State Penitentiary - formed on Isaac Franklin's Louisiana plantations after his widow Adelica sold them in 1880.
- Franklin and Armfield Office
