= Ackley (surname) =

Surname list

Ackley is an English surname. Notable people with the surname include:

- A. H. Ackley (1887–1960), American musician and composer
- B. D. Ackley (1872–1958), American musician and composer
- Brian Ackley (born 1986), American footballer
- Danielle Ackley-McPhail (born 1967), American author and editor
- Dustin Ackley (born 1988), American baseball player
- Edith Flack Ackley (1887–1970), American doll-maker
- Edward Ackley (1887–1964), American politician
- Fritz Ackley (1937–2002), American baseball player
- Gardner Ackley (1915–1998), American economist and diplomat
- Henry M. Ackley (1827–1912), American politician
- Jonathan Ackley, American video game designer, writer, and programmer
- P. O. Ackley (1903–1989), American gunsmith, barrel maker, author, columnist, and wildcat cartridge developer
