= Joseph Alexander Smith Acklen =

American lawyer, planter, and veteran of the Texas Revolution (1816–1863)

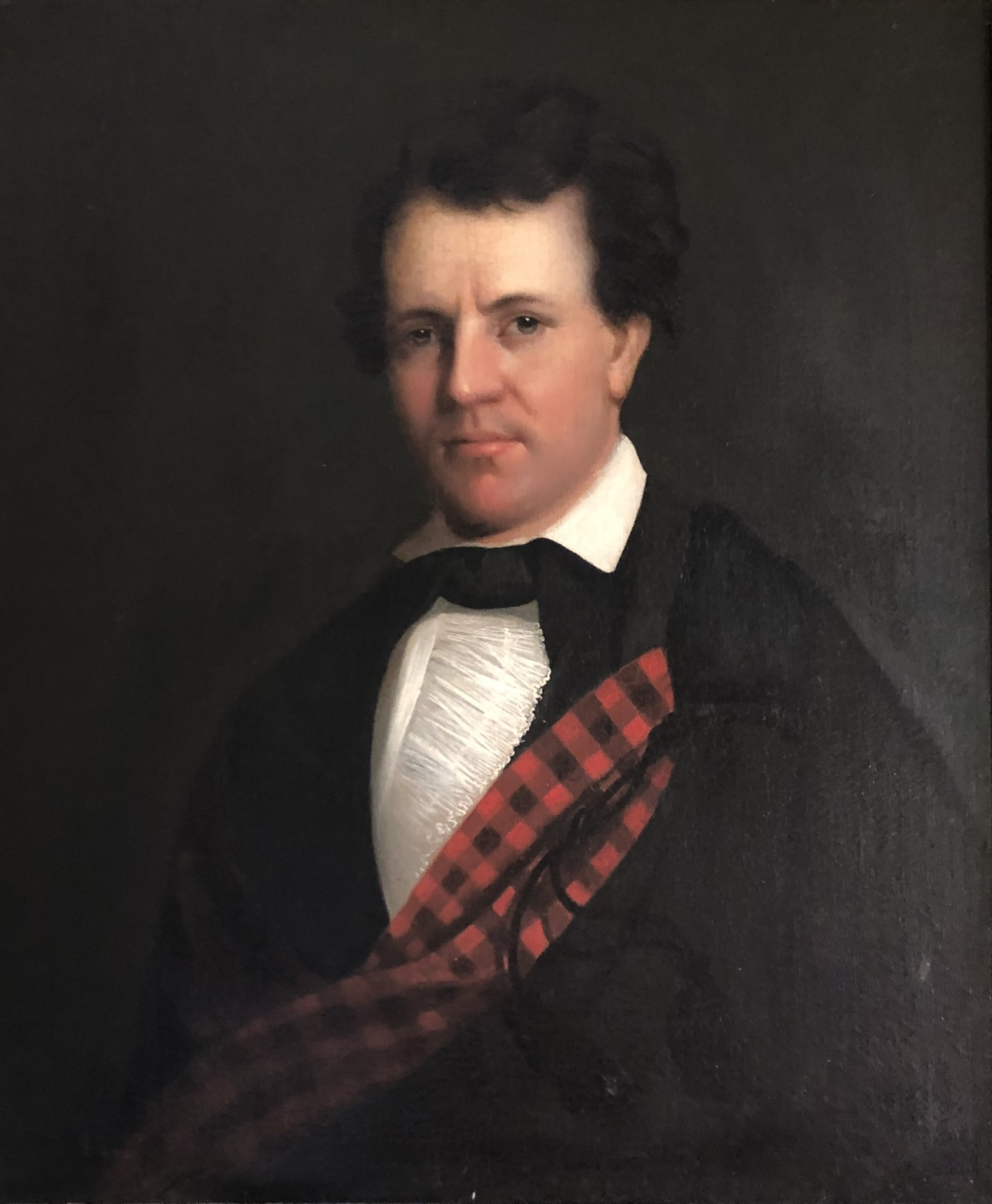
- Born: July 6, 1816; Huntsville, Alabama, United States
- Died: September 11, 1863 (aged 47); Louisiana, United States
- Resting place: Mount Olivet Cemetery
- Occupations: Soldier; Lawyer
- Spouse: Adelicia Acklen
- Children: 4, including Joseph H. Acklen and William Hayes Ackland

Joseph Alexander Smith Acklen (July 6, 1816 – September 11, 1863) was an American lawyer, planter, and veteran of the Texas Revolution, best known as the second husband of Adelicia Hayes Franklin Acklen Cheatham, and the father of U. S. Representative Joseph H. Acklen. He served as United States attorney for the Northern District of Alabama from 1840 to 1850.

== Early life ==
Joseph Alexander Smith Acklen was born in Huntsville, Alabama on July 6, 1816, to Samuel Black and Elizabeth Hunt Acklen. His grandfather, John Hunt, was a Revolutionary War veteran and one of the founders of Huntsville. Acklen was among the first attendees of the University of Alabama, although there is no record of his graduation.

== Career ==
In 1835, Acklen joined other young men from Huntsville to join in the Texas Revolution. In 1840, Acklen was appointed United States Attorney for the North Alabama Judicial District.

== Marriage ==
In 1847, Acklen visited Nashville to attend a ball hosted by John Bell, where he met the recently widowed Adelicia Franklin, and they were soon engaged. They were married on May 8, 1849. The day prior to their marriage, she asked him to sign a contract allowing her to maintain sole ownership of the lands she brought into the marriage, to which he agreed. Joseph and Adelicia Acklen resided primarily at the Louisiana estates that she inherited from her first husband, Isaac Franklin, however, they also built a summer home, the Belmont Mansion, completed in 1853. Acklen and Adelicia has six children, including U. S. Representative Joseph H. Acklen.

== Plantation management ==
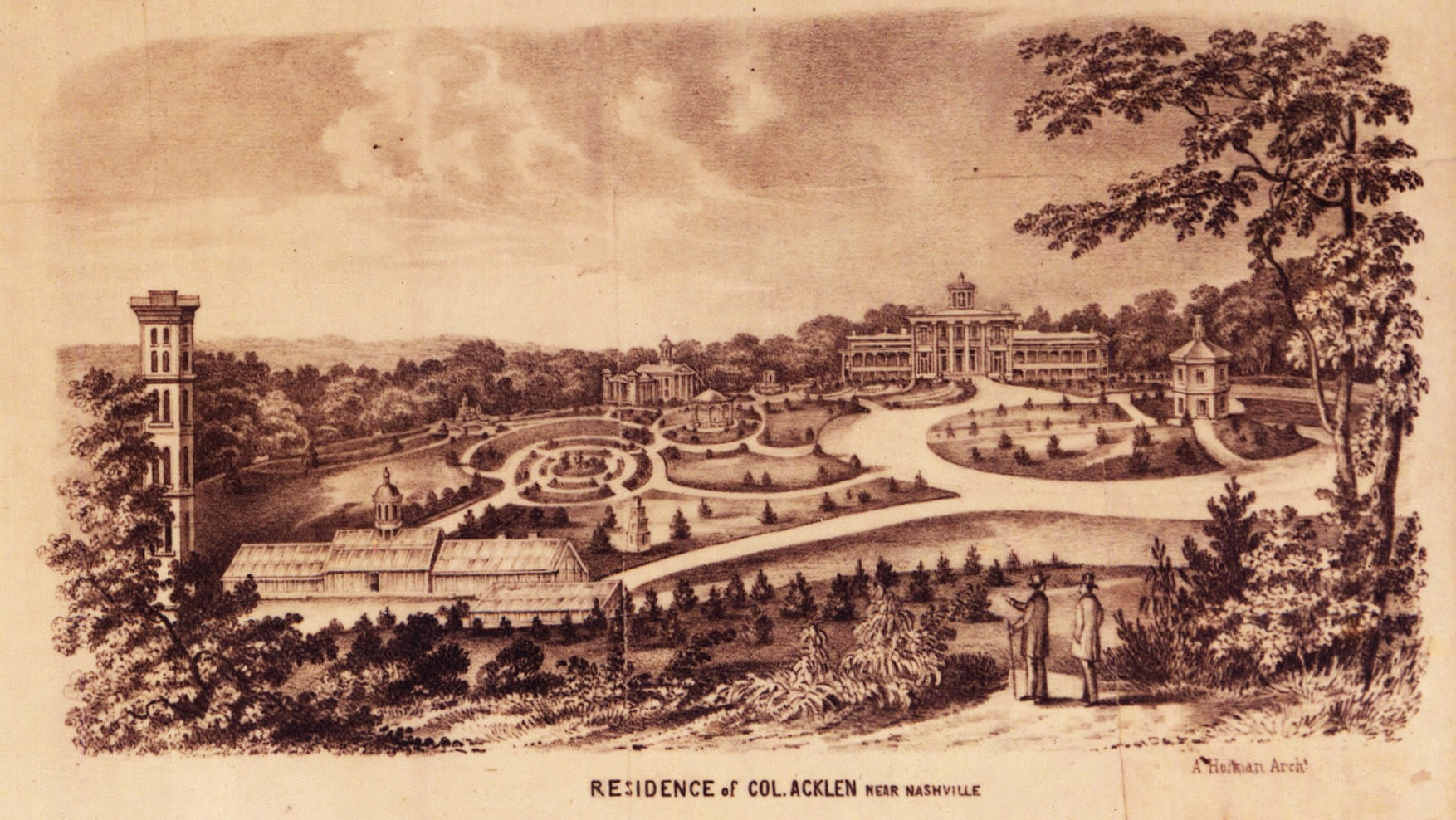
Residence of Col. Acklen near Nashville (1860)

While being a slave-owner, Acklen advocated humane treatment of slaves: his short book on his maintenance of plantations included discussion on treatment of those enslaved on plantations, which called for proper food and medicine, clean living conditions and even advising the dismissal of overseers who mistreated or were cruel to the enslaved.

In 1863, when Acklen was nearing the end of his life and was already too weak to write on his own, he dictated what turned out to be his last known letter to his wife, where he expressed his pleasure at the end of slavery, believing that the North would soon win the war.

== Death ==
After the capture of Nashville in February 1862, Acklen returned to Louisiana to tend to the estates, at the request of Adelicia. While down there he caught what was called a "bilious remittent fever", and died on September 11, 1863.
