= Bathurst War Memorial Carillon =

War memorial in Australia

Coordinates: 33°25′04″S 149°34′45″E

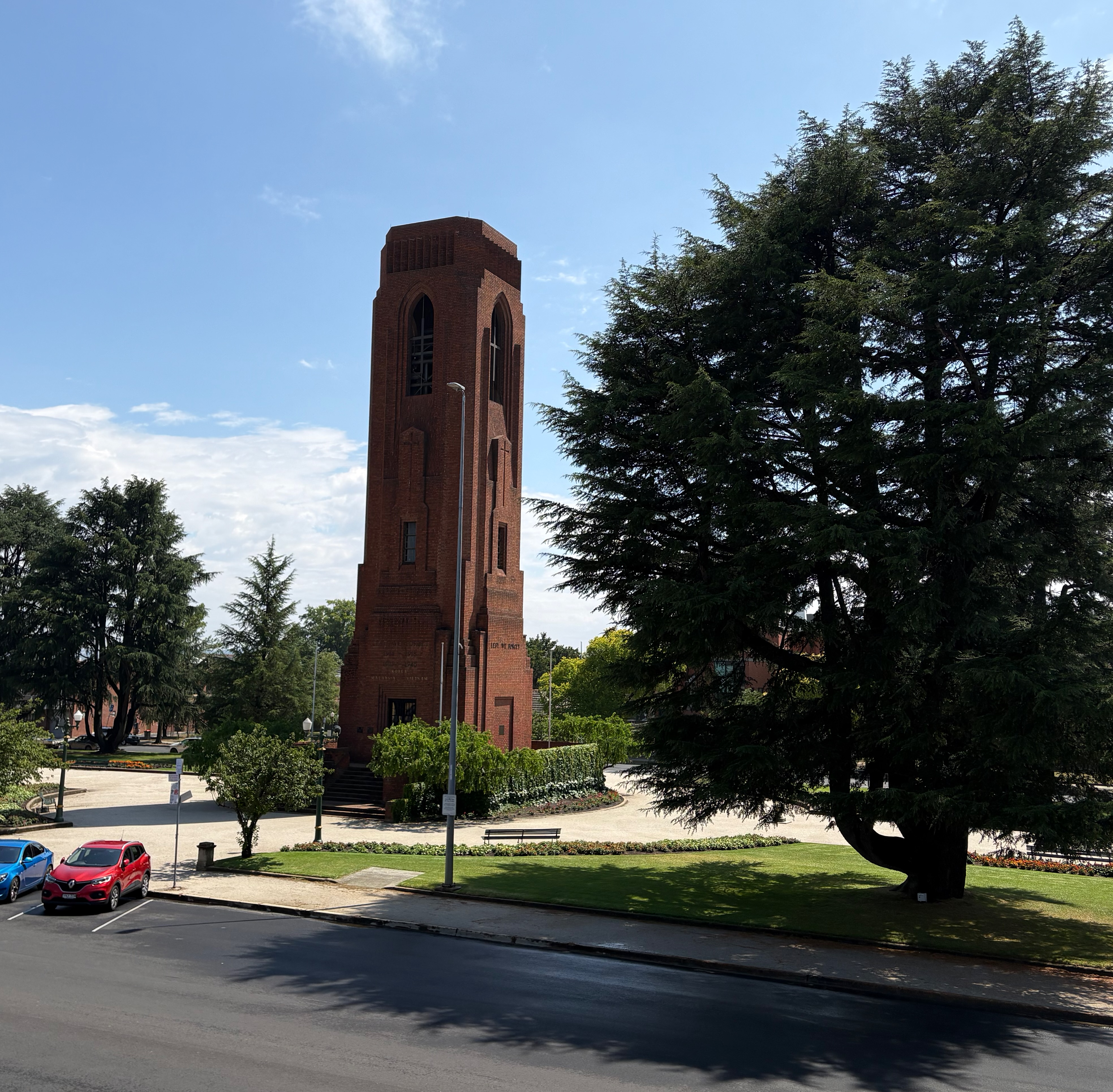
Bathurst War Memorial Carillon

The Bathurst District Soldiers' War Memorial Carillon is located in Bathurst, New South Wales, on Kings Parade between Russell Street and Church Street. The Carillon consists of 47 bells, an original arrangement of 35 with an additional 12 added in 2018, and was constructed in 1933 as a memorial to the men and women of Bathurst who served in both World War I and World War II. The memorial also contained a gas-fuelled eternal flame until replaced by a bronze sculpture in 2019.

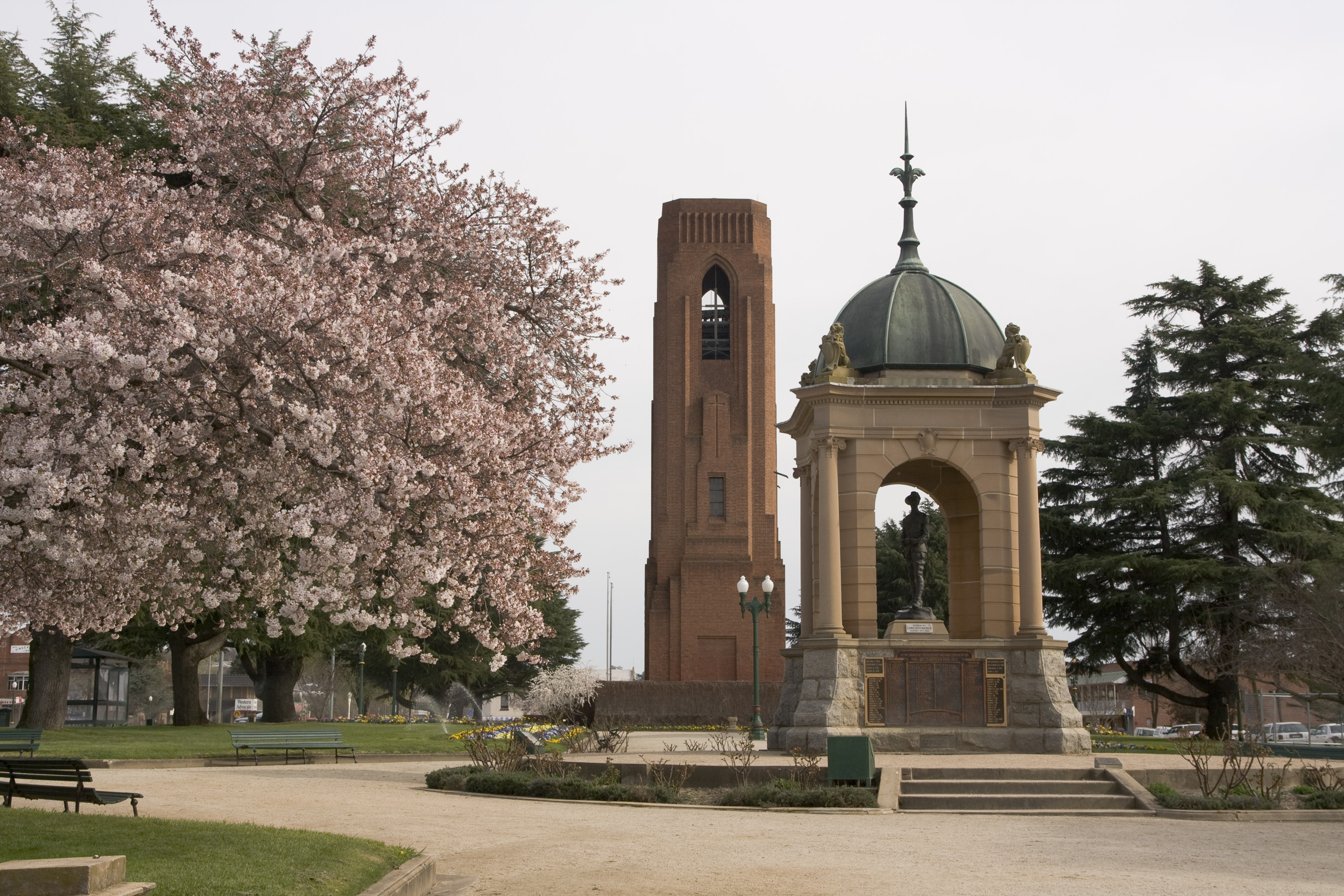
In the foreground the Boer War Memorial, in the background the War Memorial Carillon built after the First World War.

== History ==
On 25 August 1926 The National Advocate published the proposal made by Mr. R. H. Browning. Others claimed it was the idea of Mr. G. H. Hoskins inaugurated at a public meeting of citizens on 25 August, 1926.

The concept was a memorial consisting of a tower containing 23 bells, at an expected cost of £10,000 for the tower and £5,000 for the bells. The tower took seven years to build and contained 35 bells of three octaves. The heaviest bell weighs 1 ton 11 cwts (1.6 tonnes)., the smallest 18 lbs (8kg). Each bell is dedicated to a particular group such as 'our fallen comrades'. The cost of the tower was £8000 (around $0.5m in 2026). The foundation was cut through clay, and rests upon concrete foundations 47 feet (14m) deep.

Although quite different in form, at the time the Bathurst tower was claimed to be a replica of the Carillon Tower, Loughborough, England. There was a connection to Loughborough as the original bells were cast in1928 by John Taylor & Co., Bell Founders and Bell Hangers of Loughborough, England. A further 24 bells, including 12 Peace Bells were cast by the same company in 2018.

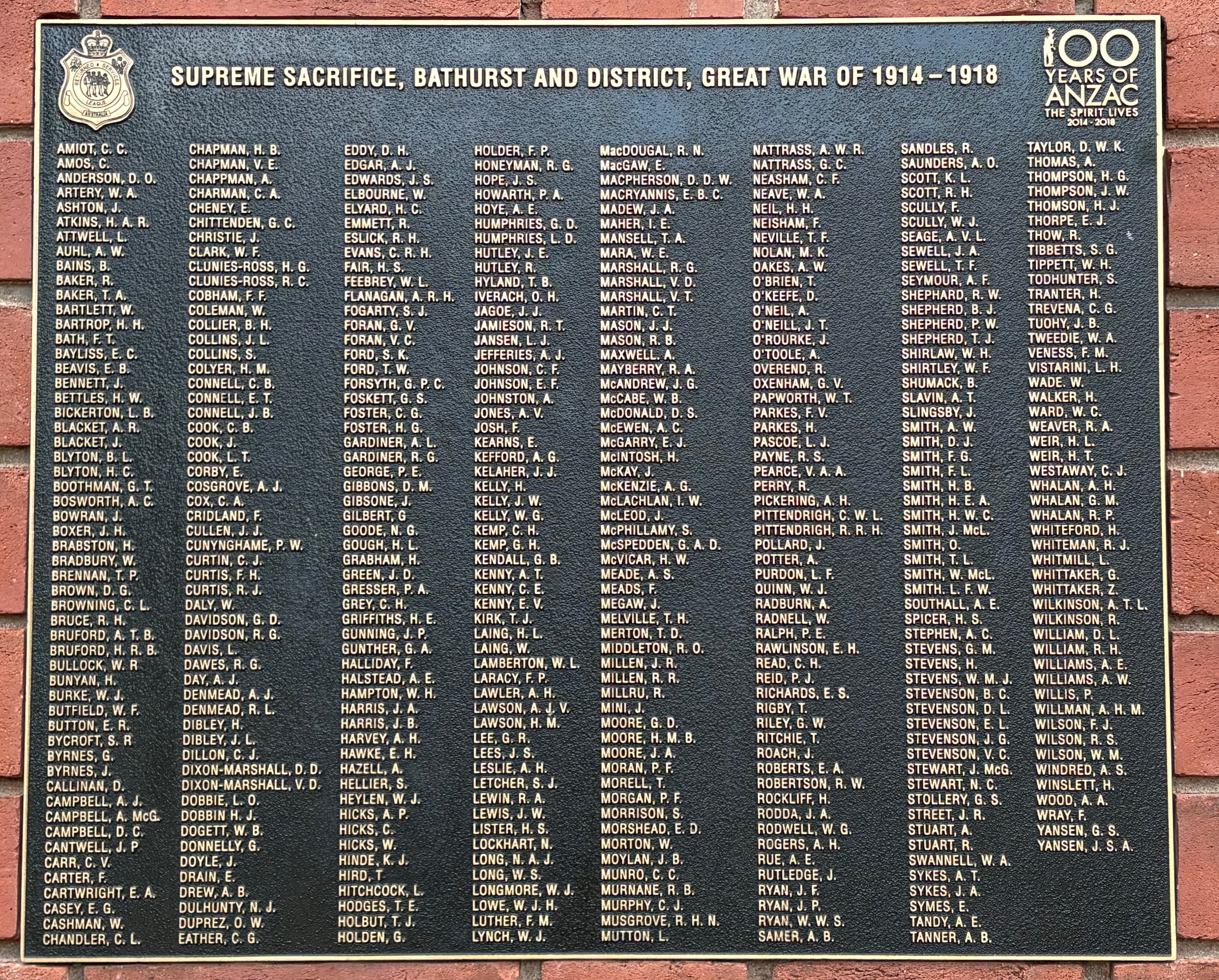
Plaque listing soldiers from Bathurst killed in action in the First World War

The last brick of the tower was laid on Monday 24 April 1933 - the day before the Day of Anzac Celebration in 1933. At the mid-morning ceremony the Deputy Mayor Alderman Browning appealed for funds so that the 'bells and the machinery to operate them' might be ready to enable 'peals of joy to be rung' on Armistice Day. Major Goldenstedt reminded the crowd that Bathurst was the first town in the Commonwealth to offer men and women when the Commonwealth called for 20,000 volunteers at the outbreak of the Great War.

The completed memorial was unveiled on 12 November 1933. The city was thronged with visitors. A procession headed by two bands, with militia, returned soldiers, and about 8,000 pupils of the schools and colleges, paraded the principal streets.

The Mayor, Alderman Griffen, in his address said "Let us prove to those who make the supreme sacrifice, and to those who came through that awful period of suffering, that the spirit of loyalty and self-sacrifice they displayed for their country's sake has not been allowed to die with them, but lives to-day in the hearts and minds of every man and woman in Australia. "The cause they fought and died for we will live for — that Is, the cause of justice, the cause of liberty, the cause of peace among the nations or the earth, tho cause of goodwill to man." The service was broadcast by 2FC out of Sydney.

== Plaques ==
There are two plaques on the side of the memorial, both commemorating the 50th anniversary of the end of World War II – the first unveiled by Peter Wellington, and the other unveiled by Doreen Smith. Inside the building many more plaques have been erected to commemorate sacrifices made by service men and women.

== See also ==
- List of carillons in Australia and New Zealand
