= Atkinsons of London =

British perfumery

Coordinates: 51.5095°N 0.1412°W

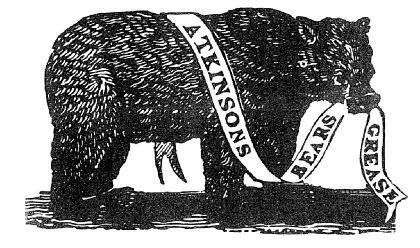
- Industry: Perfume
- Founded: 1799 in London, England
- Founder: James Atkinson
- Headquarters: Burlington Gardens, London, England
- Key people: Enrico Ceccato, CEO
- Products: Fragrances, toiletries and cosmetics
- Owner: Perfume Holding of Italy
- Website: Official website

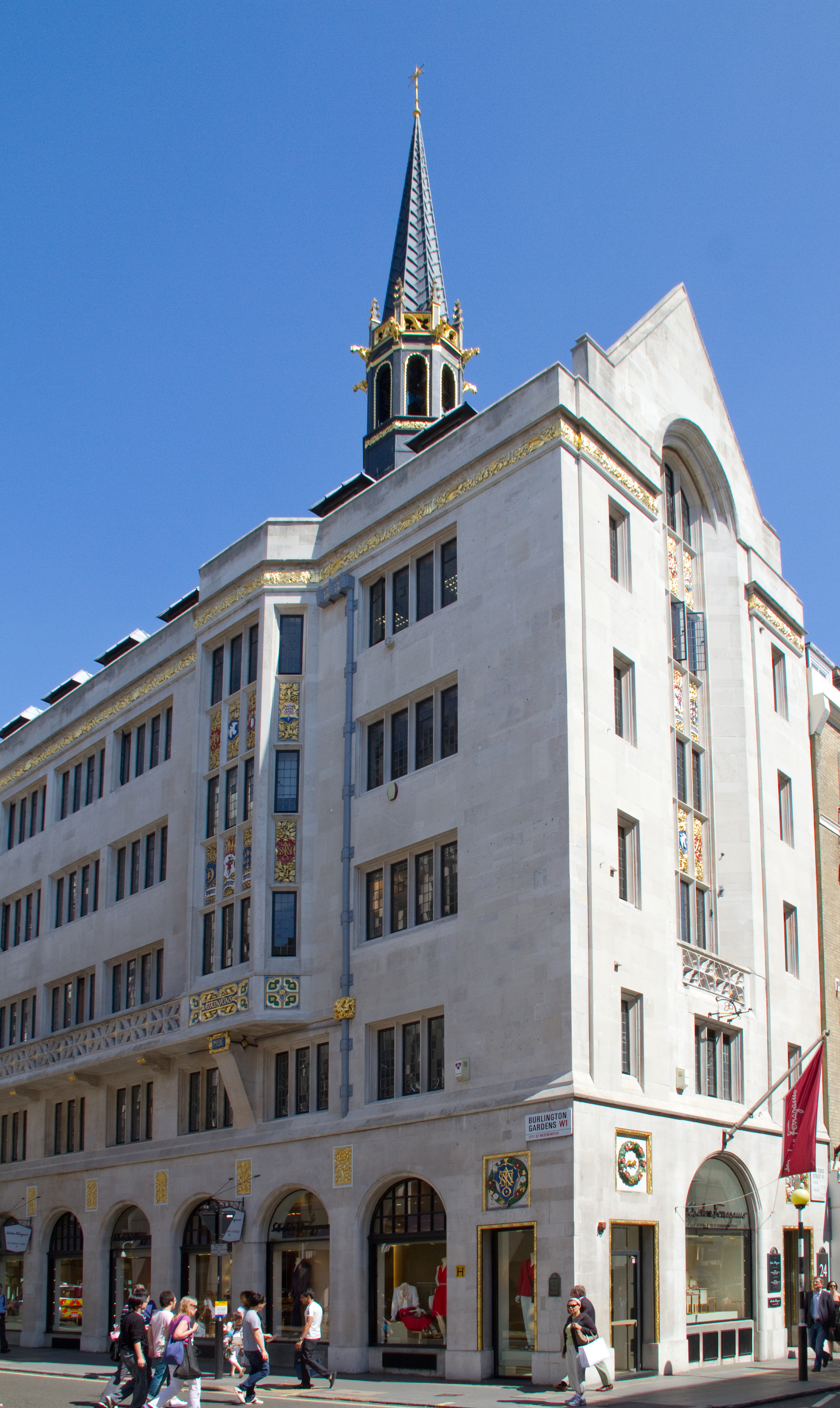
The Atkinsons Building

Atkinsons of London is a British perfume house founded in London in 1799. The brand was relaunched in September 2013 after a long dormant period off the market.

== History ==
The brand was founded by James Atkinson, who was later joined by his brother Edward Atkinson. James Atkinson traveled to London from Cumberland in the far north of England, with detailed recipes of toiletries and fragrances that he had concocted, along with bear's grease balm and a real bear.

They created fragrances, toiletries and cosmetics at their factory at the Eonia Works, Southwark Park Road, Rotherhithe, London. At first Atkinson's most successful product was a hair pomade made with bear grease. In 1832, James Atkinson was appointed Perfumer to the Court of St. James.

Professor John Strachan in Advertising and Satirical Culture in the Romantic Period notes that James Atkinson was best known for his bear's grease product, which remained in production until after the First World War. Atkinsons' logo was a chained bear and this was heavily featured in their advertising. Bear's grease was supposed to facilitate the regrowth of hair for bald men, a claim made by Atkinsons and others.

== Notable customers ==
As well as King George IV, who gave the firm his Royal Warrant, notable customers included the Duke of Wellington, Admiral Lord Nelson, Beau Brummell, Sarah Bernhardt, Emma, Lady Hamilton, the Tsar of Russia and the King of Italy.

== Atkinsons Building, London ==
In 1926, the architect Vincent Harris built the Atkinsons Building, at 2–4 Burlington Gardens, London, now a Grade II listed building on the corner with Old Bond Street and Burlington Gardens. It was built in the Gothic Revival style and includes Arts and Crafts detailing. A spire features a carillon of 23 bells cast by Gillett & Johnston. The Atkinsons Building is now occupied by a Salvatore Ferragamo women's fashion store.

== Relaunch ==
After a period of disuse, the brand is now owned by the Italian-based company Perfume Holding, and was relaunched in September 2013. The brand had been sold several times in the early 2000s, before being bought by Perfume Holding from Procter & Gamble in 2008.
