= List of carillons in Australia and New Zealand =

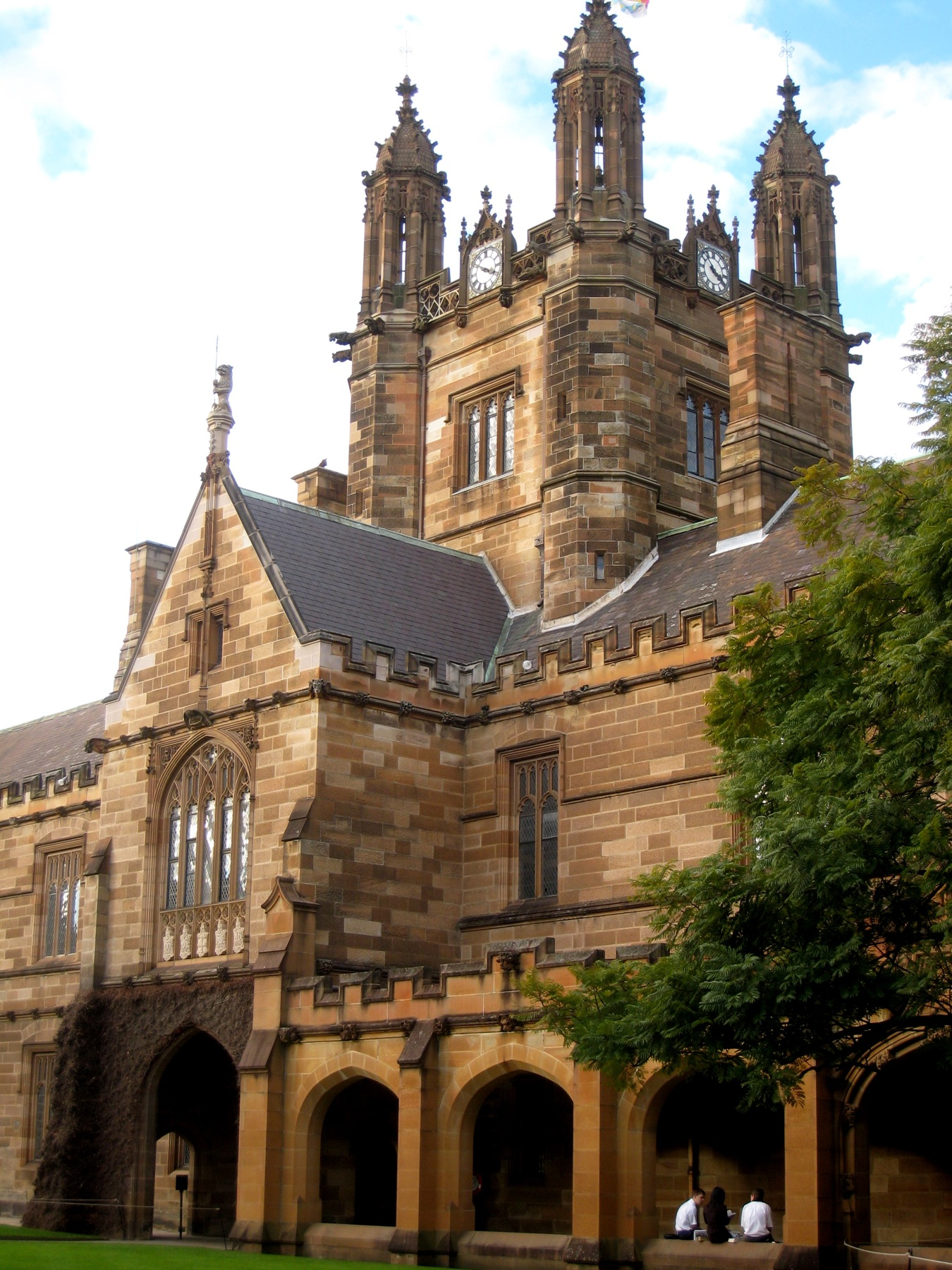
The carillon at the University of Sydney Quadrangle memorialises fallen soldiers of the First World War

Carillons, musical instruments in the percussion family with at least 23 cast bells and played with a keyboard, are found in Australia and New Zealand as a result of the First World War. During the German occupation of Belgium, many of the country's carillons were silenced or destroyed. This news circulated among the Allied Powers, who saw it as "the brutal annihilation of a unique democratic music instrument". The destruction was romanticized in poetry and music, particularly in England. Poets – often exaggerating reality – wrote that the Belgian carillons were in mourning and awaited to ring out on the day of the country's liberation. Edward Elgar composed a work for orchestra which includes motifs of bells and a spoken text anticipating the victory of the Belgian people. He later even composed a work specifically for the carillon. Following the war, countries in the Anglosphere built their own carillons to memorialise the lives lost and to promote world peace, including two in Australia and one in New Zealand.

The World Carillon Federation and the Carillon Society of Australia counts carillons throughout Australia and New Zealand. According to the two sources, there are four carillons: three in Australia and one in New Zealand. The largest and heaviest carillon is the National War Memorial Carillon in Wellington, New Zealand, weighing 70,620 kilograms (155,690 lb). The carillons were primarily constructed in the interwar period by the English bellfounders John Taylor & Co, Gillett & Johnston, and Whitechapel. Almost all of the carillons are transposing instruments.

According to the World Carillon Federation, the carillons in Australia and New Zealand account for less than one per cent of the world's total.

== Criteria for inclusion ==
The World Carillon Federation defines a carillon as an instrument of at least 23 cast bronze bells hung in fixed suspension, played with a traditional keyboard of batons, and tuned in chromatic order so that they can be sounded harmoniously together. It may designate instruments of 15 to 22 bells built before 1940 as "historical carillons". Its member organizations – including for example the Carillon Society of Australia – also define a carillon with those restrictions. This list contains only those carillons that meet the definition outlined by these organizations.

== Australia ==
List of carillons in Australia
| Location | City | Bells | Bourdon weight | | Total weight | | Range and transposition | Bellfounder(s) | Ref. |
| Location | City | Bells | kg | lb | kg | lb | Range and transposition | Bellfounder(s) | Ref. |
|---|---|---|---|---|---|---|---|---|---|
| Carillon War Memorial | Bathurst | 47 | 1,574 | 3,470 | —N/a | | Up 2 semitones | John Taylor & Co 1928/2020 | |
| National Carillon | Canberra | 57 | 6,108 | 13,466 | —N/a | | None (concert pitch) | John Taylor & Co 1970/2003/2020 | |
| University of Sydney Quadrangle | Sydney | 54 | 4,250 | 9,370 | 27,000 | 60,000 | Up 1 semitone | John Taylor & Co 1927; Whitechapel 2003 | |

== New Zealand ==
List of carillons in New Zealand
| Location | City | Bells | Bourdon weight | | Total weight | | Range and transposition | Bellfounder(s) | Ref. |
| Location | City | Bells | kg | lb | kg | lb | Range and transposition | Bellfounder(s) | Ref. |
|---|---|---|---|---|---|---|---|---|---|
| National War Memorial Carillon | Wellington | 74 | 12,485 | 27,525 | 70,620 | 155,690 | Down 2 semitones | Gillett & Johnston 1928–29; John Taylor & Co 1985; Royal Eijsbouts/Whitechapel/Lips 1995 | |
