= List of carillons of the British Isles =

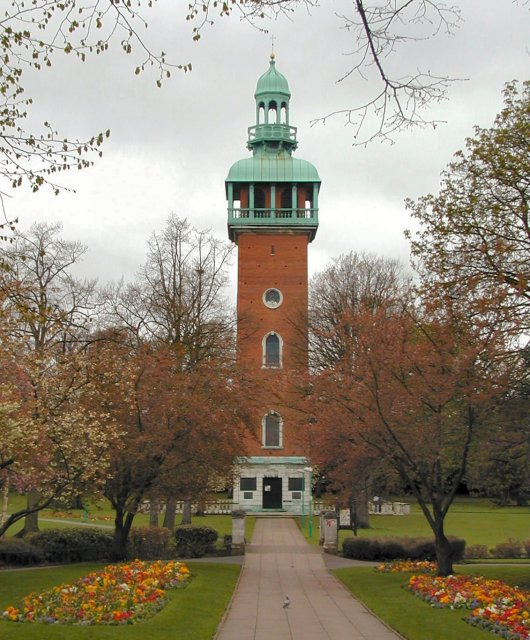
The Loughborough Carillon in Loughborough, England, memorialises fallen soldiers of the First World War

Carillons, musical instruments in the percussion family with at least 23 cast bells and played with a keyboard, are found throughout the British Isles as a result of the First World War. During the German occupation of Belgium, many of the country's carillons were silenced or destroyed. This news circulated among the Allied Powers, who saw it as "the brutal annihilation of a unique democratic music instrument". The destruction was romanticized in poetry and music, particularly in England. Poets – often exaggerating reality – wrote that the Belgian carillons were in mourning and awaited to ring out on the day of the country's liberation. Edward Elgar composed a work for orchestra which includes motifs of bells and a spoken text anticipating the victory of the Belgian people. He later even composed a work specifically for the carillon. Following the war, countries in the Anglosphere built their own carillons to memorialise the lives lost and to promote world peace, including two in England.

The Carillon Society of Britain and Ireland (CSBI) counts carillons throughout the British Isles. Dove's Guide for Church Bell Ringers, a publication that historically concerns itself with bell sets outfitted for full circle ringing, also counts carillons in the region. According to the two sources, there are fifteen carillons: eight in England, one in the Republic of Ireland, one in Northern Ireland, and five in Scotland. There are no carillons in Guernsey, the Isle of Man, Jersey or Wales.

The heaviest carillon is at the Kirk of St Nicholas in Aberdeen, Scotland, weighing 25,846 kilograms (56,981 lb); the lightest is at the Atkinsons Building in London, weighing 3,194 kilograms (7,041 lb). The carillon of St Colman's Cathedral in Cobh has the most bells – 49. The region has several two- and three-octave carillons. The heaviest two-octave carillon in the world – weighing 22,669 kg (49,976 lb) – is located in Newcastle upon Tyne. The carillons were primarily constructed in the interwar period by the English bellfounders Gillett & Johnston and John Taylor & Co. Almost all of the carillons are transposing instruments, all of which transpose such that the lowest note on the keyboard is C.

According to the World Carillon Federation, the carillons of the British Isles account for two percent of the world's total.

== Criteria for inclusion ==
The World Carillon Federation defines a carillon as an instrument of at least 23 cast bronze bells hung in fixed suspension, played with a traditional keyboard of batons, and tuned in chromatic order so that they can be sounded harmoniously together. It may designate instruments of 15 to 22 bells built before 1940 as "historical carillons". Its member organizations – including for example the Carillon Society of Britain and Ireland – also define a carillon with those restrictions. This list contains only those carillons that meet the definition outlined by these organizations.

== England ==
List of carillons in England
Location	City	Bells	Bourdon weight		Total weight		Range and transposition	Bellfounder(s)	Ref.
Location	City	Bells	kg	lb	kg	lb	Range and transposition	Bellfounder(s)	Ref.
Bournville Primary School	Bournville	48	3,260	7,186	17,655	38,923	Down 2 semitones	John Taylor & Co 1906–25; Gillett & Johnston 1934; John Taylor & Co 2015	
Charterhouse School (Note: The carillon was moved from the Mostyn House School in 2010.)	Godalming	37	951	2,097	6,790	14,969	Up 4 semitones	John Taylor & Co 1921–23	
Atkinsons Building	London	23	620	1,360	3,194	7,041	Up 8 semitones	Gillett & Johnston 1925–27	
Loughborough Carillon	Loughborough	47	4,232	9,330	20,986	46,266	Down 4 semitones	John Taylor & Co 1923–29	
Newcastle Civic Centre	Newcastle upon Tyne	25	3,626	7,993	22,669	49,976	Down 3 semitones	John Taylor & Co 1963–67	
Church of St Mary, Lowe House	St Helens, Merseyside	47	4,302	9,484	21,234	46,813	Down 5 semitones	John Taylor & Co 1929	
Our Lady of the Rosary and St Therese of Lisieux RC Church	Saltley	23	870	1,918	4,565	10,064	Up 6 semitones	Gillett & Johnston 1932	
York Minster	York	35	1,215	2,679	6,867	15,139	Up 2 semitones	John Taylor & Co 1933–2008	

== Northern Ireland ==
List of carillons in Northern Ireland
Location	City	Bells	Bourdon weight		Total weight		Range and transposition	Bellfounder(s)	Ref.
Location	City	Bells	kg	lb	kg	lb	Range and transposition	Bellfounder(s)	Ref.
St Patrick's Cathedral (Roman Catholic)	Armagh	39	2,190	4,830	10,850	23,910	None (concert pitch)	John Taylor & Co 1920	

== Republic of Ireland ==
According to the CSBI, there is one carillon in the Republic of Ireland, which is located at St Colman's Cathedral in Cobh. In 2019, playing this cathedral's carillon was recognized by the Irish government as key element of the country's living cultural heritage.

List of carillons in the Republic of Ireland
Location	City	Bells	Bourdon weight		Total weight		Range and transposition	Bellfounder(s)	Ref.
Location	City	Bells	kg	lb	kg	lb	Range and transposition	Bellfounder(s)	Ref.
St Colman's Cathedral	Cobh	49	3,439	7,582	22,327	49,223	Down 3 semitones	John Taylor & Co 1915–58; Gillett & Johnston 1948; Royal Eijsbouts 1998	

== Scotland ==
List of carillons in Scotland
Location		City	Bells	Bourdon weight		Total weight		Range and transposition	Bellfounder(s)	Ref.
Location		City	Bells	kg	lb	kg	lb	Range and transposition	Bellfounder(s)	Ref.
	Kirk of St Nicholas	Aberdeen	48	4,571	10,078	25,846	56,981	Down 4 semitones	Gillett & Johnston 1952–54	
—N/a	St Patrick's Church	Dumbarton	23	860	1,900	4,603	10,148	Up 6 semitones	Gillett & Johnston 1927–28	
	St Marnock's Church	Kilmarnock	30	635	1,401	4,272	9,418	Up 7 semitones	Mears & Stainbank (Whitechapel) 1954	
	St John's Kirk	Perth	35	1,430	3,150	7,883	17,379	Up 1 semitone	Waghevens 1506; Gillett & Johnston 1934	
	Holy Trinity Church	St Andrews	27	1,593	3,512	7,587	16,726	Up 1 semitone	John Taylor & Co 1926–98	

== See also ==
- Index of campanology articles
