= Bear's grease =

Historical treatment for hair loss

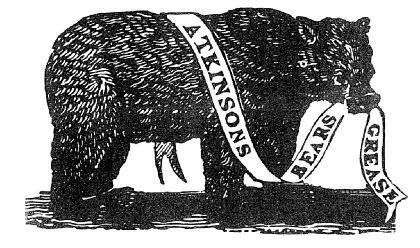
Trade mark of Atkinsons of London, c. 1830

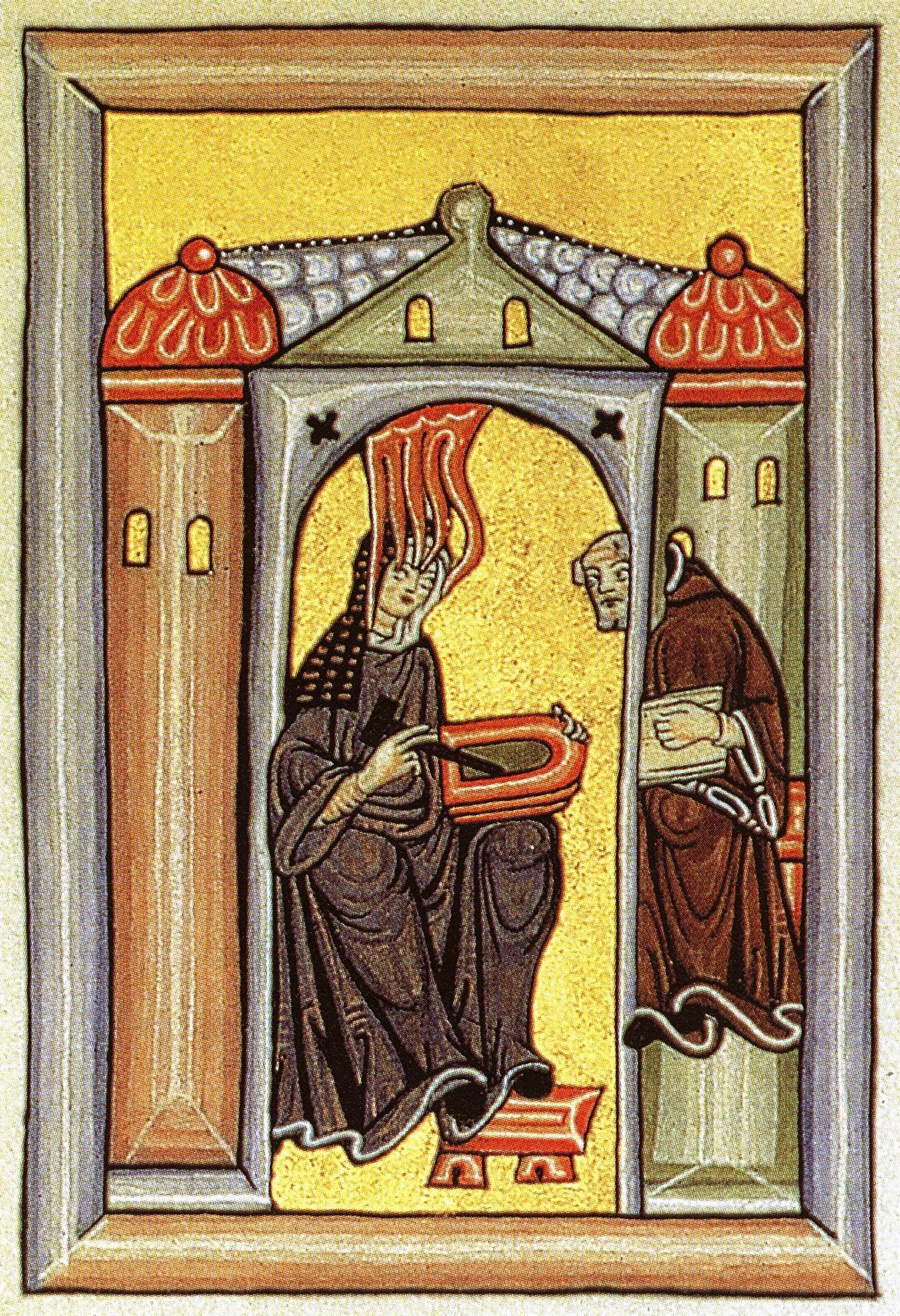
Hildegard of Bingen recommended the use of bear's grease for hair loss

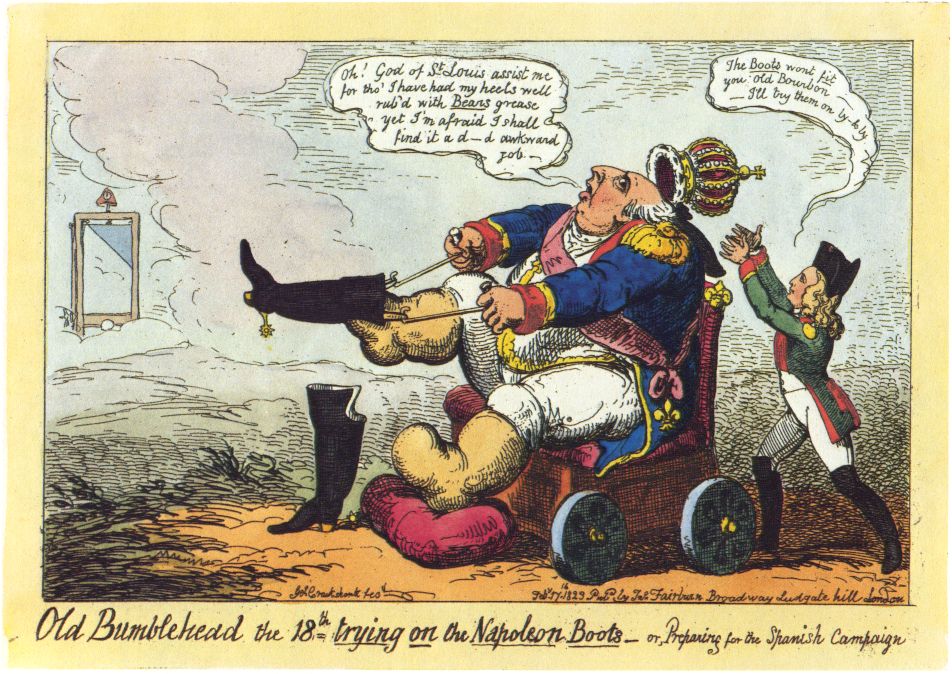
Old Bumblehead the 18th trying on the Napoleon Boots, George Cruikshank, 1823

Bear's grease was a popular treatment for men with hair loss from at least as early as 70 CE until about the First World War. The myth of its effectiveness is based on the belief that as bears are very hairy, their fat would assist hair growth in others. Nicholas Culpeper, the English botanist and herbalist wrote in 1653, in his The Physician's Library, "Bears Grease staies [stops] the falling off of the hair." Hildegard of Bingen (1098–1179), Benedictine mystic, composer and woman of letters, also recommended the use of the substance in her Physica (repeated in her Causae et Curae). A number of cosmetics companies sold bear's grease, and it was a trademark of Atkinsons of London, who sold "Bears Grease Pomade". In the early 1880s in Arkansas, an ell of bear grease, formed from the hide from the head and neck of a deer, was a standard medium of exchange.

== Preparation ==
In the Roman Empire, according to Dioscorides, bear fat was removed from the around the kidneys of the bear then manually rubbed in cold rain water. The rinsed bear fat was then set in a ceramic jar with water and heated and stirred over a coal fire. It was then strained, placed in a second jar, melted for a second time, and then had the "filth" removed from the bottom. After being melted for a third time and placed in a mortar, it was stored in sealed or corked jars.

Bear's grease was made from the fat of the brown bear mixed with beef marrow and a perfume to disguise the smell. Before the start of the twentieth century, manufacturers were substituting pig, veal, suet, lard and beef marrow fat for bear's fat as the demand exceeded the available supply of genuine bear's fat. To these substitutes they added lavender, thyme, rose essence, or oil of bitter almonds for perfume. A green dye was added for the sake of appearances.

It was speculated that 99% of “bear grease” in 1850s England actually contained pig fat, and unscrupulous manufacturers would sometimes keep a bear skin, which they would attach to a dead pig carcass. The purpose of this display was to convince customers that they were selling genuine bear grease.

== Europe ==
During the Roman Empire, various parts of the bear were recommended for both cosmetic and medicinal purposes. Greco-Roman physician and writer Dioscorides describes uses of bear grease and gives specific instructions on obtaining and storing the substance in his 1st century pharmacopoeia De Materia Medica. Dioscorides writes that bears' fat is "thought to make hair destroyed by alopecia grow again, and is good for chilblains."

The general public believed that grease from Russian bears was the best available. In the 1823 cartoon by George Cruikshank on the right, reference is made to "heels well rub'd with bears grease" (by which Russian support is meant). The French King Louis XVIII is unable to put on Napoleon II's boots, and Napoleon's son stands ready to catch the Bourbon crown should it fall.

Professor John Strachan in his book, Advertising and Satirical Culture in the Romantic Period notes that Atkinsons of London were best known for their bear's grease product, which remained in production until after the First World War. Atkinsons' logo was a chained bear, and this was heavily featured in their advertising. The claim that bear's grease could facilitate the regrowth of hair for bald men, was made by Atkinsons and others.

Among the members of the Ursari community, a group of nomadic Romani bear trainers, who manufactured objects of bone, it became widespread to treat the material with bear fat, a luxury good which, they believed, helped make the products in question more durable. The fat was also being sold to Romanians as medicine to combat rheumatism and skeletal disorders, together with bear hairs that were a popular amulet.

== Native American use ==
The use of bear's grease among the Native Americans on their hair to make it shinier was widespread. Other popular substances included deer marrow and raccoon fat. In the Northeast tribes of the Sauk, Huron, and Delaware, the daily use of bear grease on their hair was popular among both men and women. Men in the Dakota Sioux and Crow tribes also regularly used bear's grease. Benjamin West, who was one of the early American fine artists, said he was first taught how to make paint as a child by a Native American friend who showed him how paint could be made by mixing clay with bear grease.
