= Atkinsons Building, London =

Coordinates: 51°30′34″N 0°08′28″W

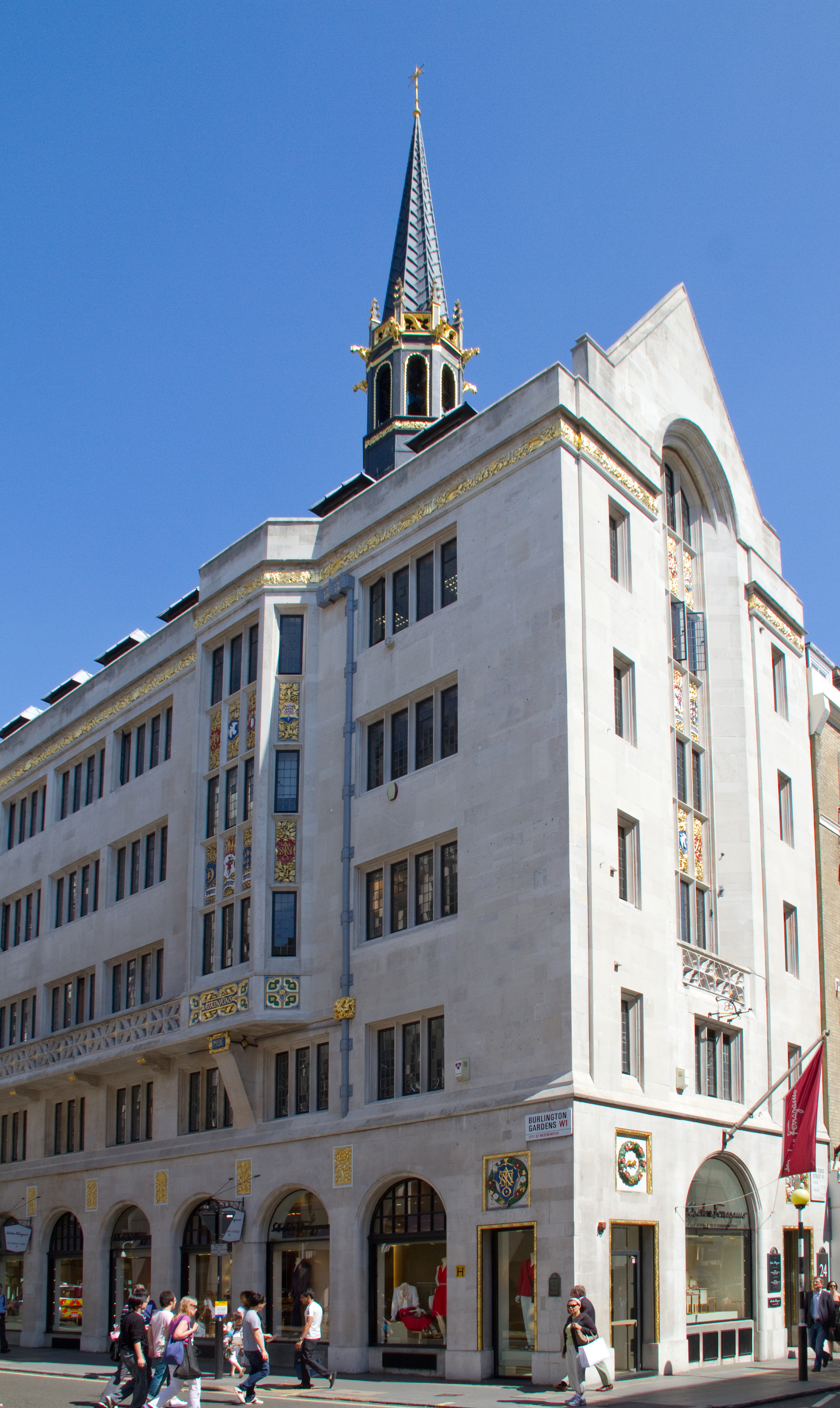
Atkinsons Building. Burlington Gardens side on the left of the picture, Old Bond Street on the right.

Atkinsons Building, which includes 2 and 4 Burlington Gardens, is a Grade II listed building on the corner of Old Bond Street and Burlington Gardens. It was built in 1926 in the Gothic Revival style and includes Arts and Crafts detailing.

The architect was Vincent Harris (1876–1971). The building was designed for the perfume company Atkinsons of London. It is currently occupied by a Salvatore Ferragamo women's fashion store.

The spire of the building contains a carillon musical instrument of 23 bells cast by Gillett & Johnston.

== Gallery ==
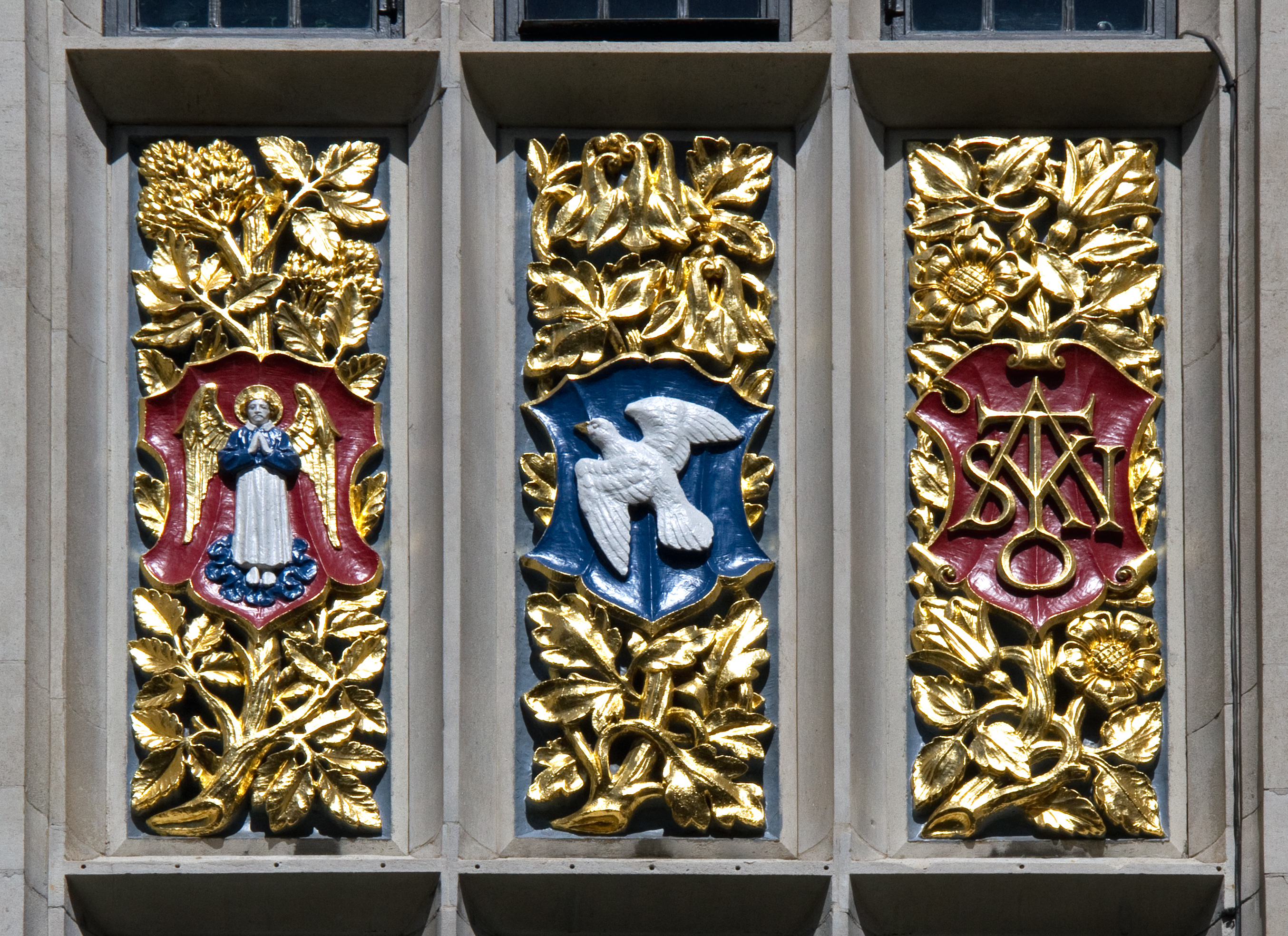
Detail.

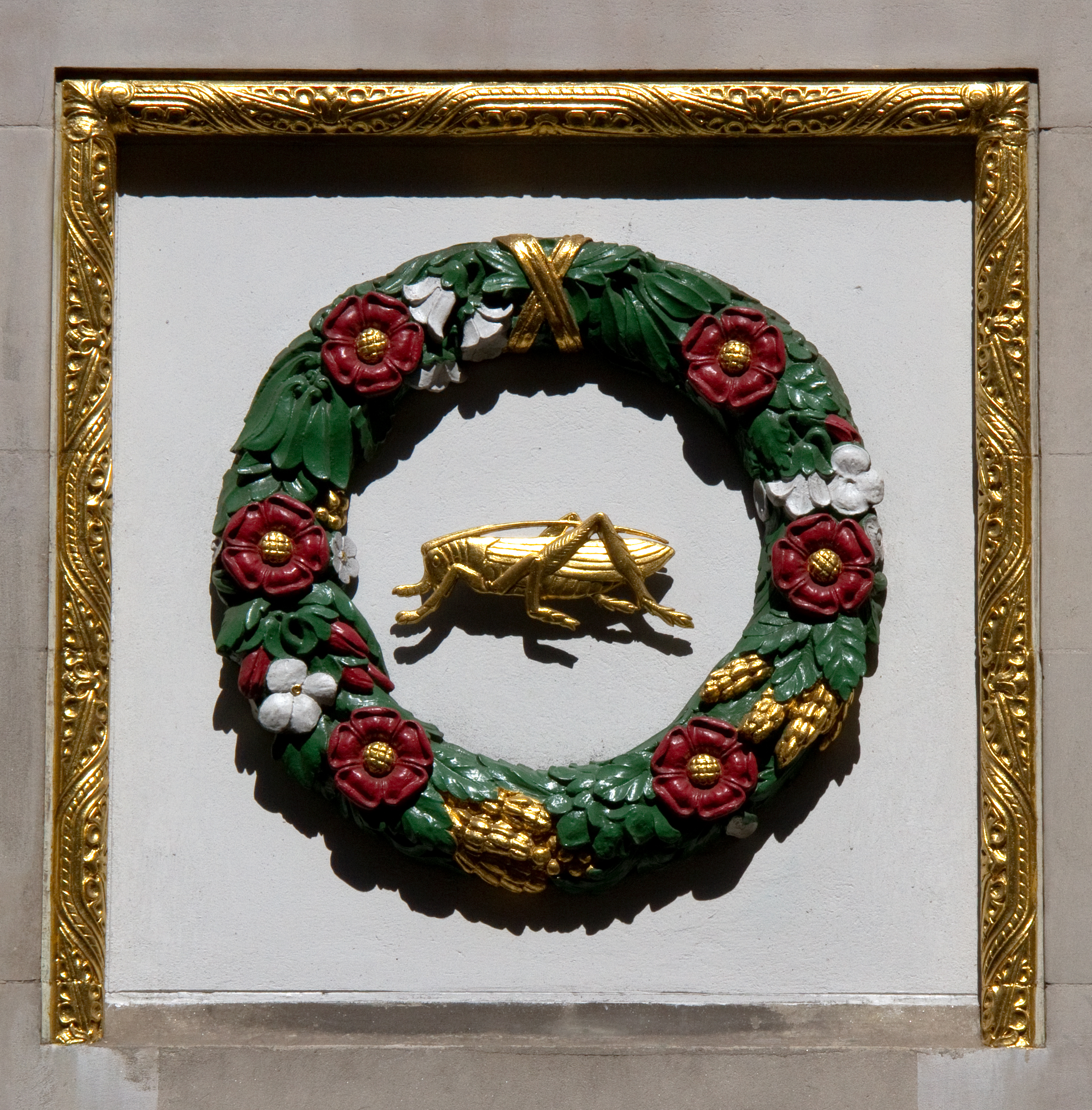
Detail.

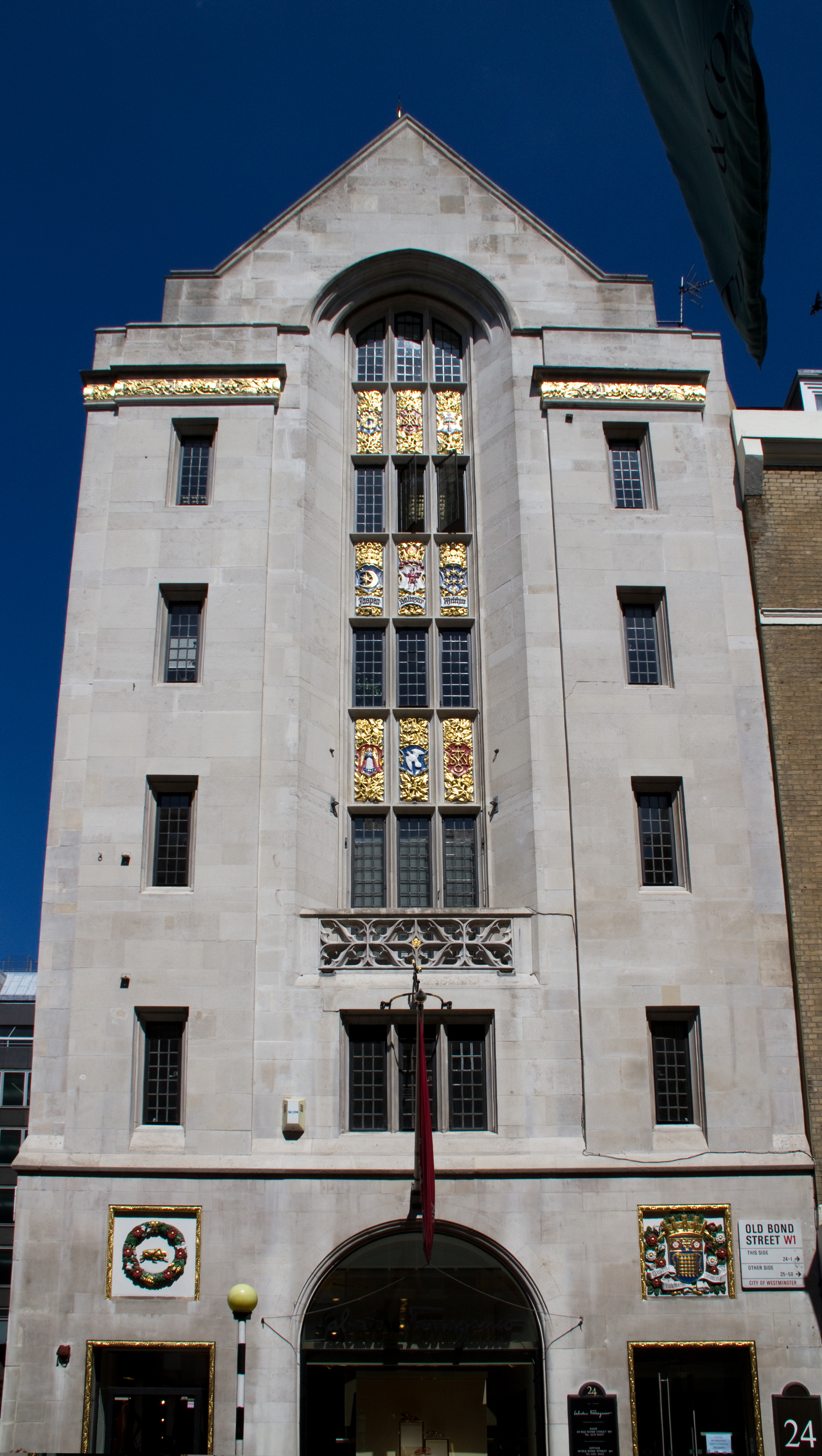
Old Bond Street side.

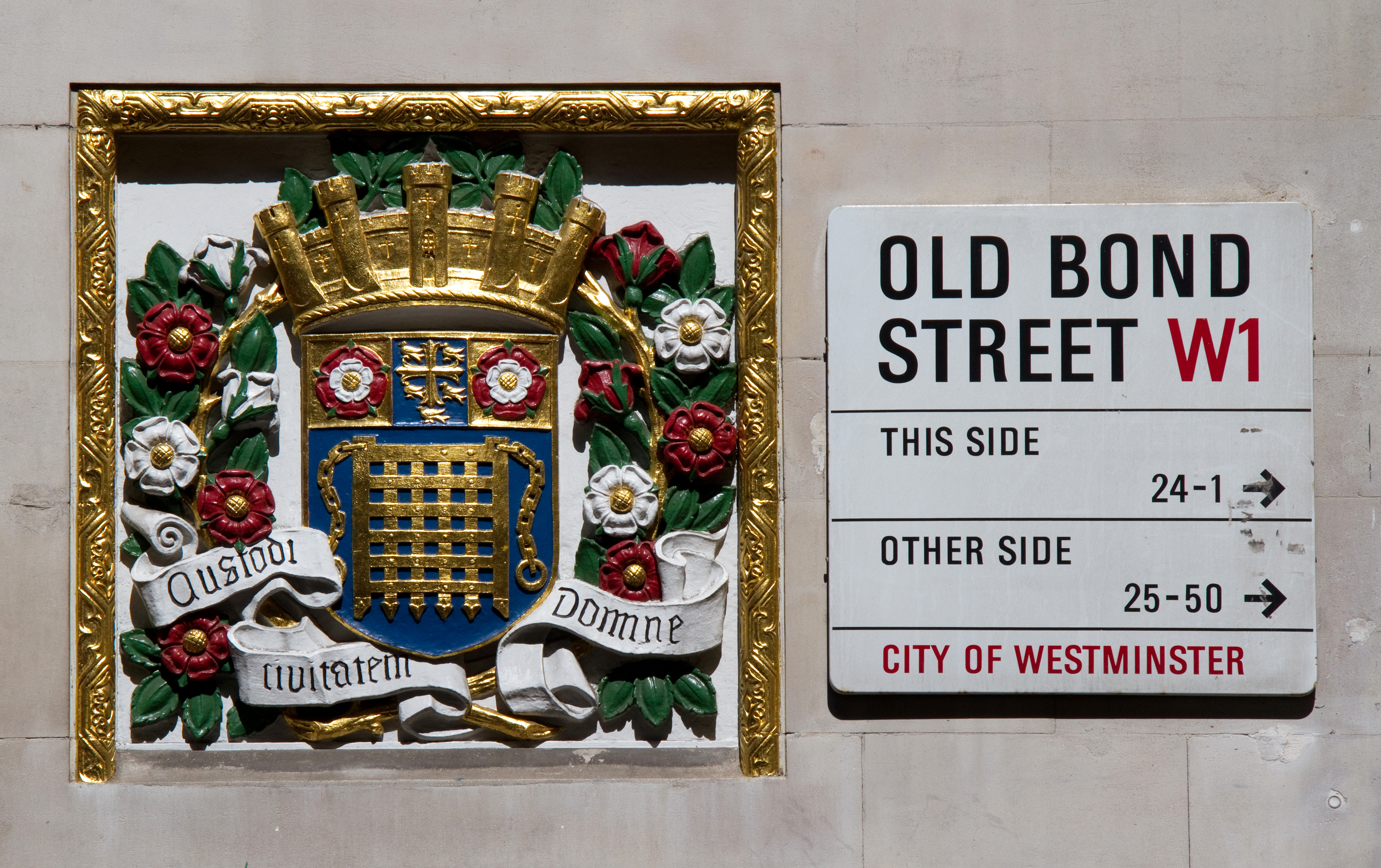
Detail and street sign.

== See also ==
- List of carillons of the British Isles
