= Holy Trinity Church, St Andrews =

Church in Fife, Scotland

Coordinates: 56°20′23″N 2°47′44″W

Holy Trinity Church in 2015

Holy Trinity Church is a Church of Scotland parish church in St Andrews, Fife. It is a Category A listed building.

== History ==
Holy Trinity Church (also known as the Holy Trinity Parish Church or "town kirk") is the most historic church in St Andrews. The church was initially built on land close to the south-east gable of the cathedral, around 1144 by Bishop Robert Kennedy. The church was dedicated in 1234 by Bishop David de Bernham and then moved to a new site on the north side of South Street between 1410 and 1412 by Bishop Wardlaw. Towards the end of June 1547, this was the location where John Knox first preached in public and to which he returned to give an inflammatory sermon on 4 June 1559 which led to the stripping of both the cathedral and ecclesiastical status. Much of the architecture feature of the church was lost in the re-building by Robert Balfour between 1798 and 1800. The church was later restored to a (more elaborately decorated) approximation of its medieval appearance between 1907 and 1909 by MacGregor Chalmers. Only the north-western tower and spire with parts of the arcade arches were retained.

== See also ==
- List of carillons of the British Isles
