= Loughborough Carillon =

Bell instrument in Loughborough, England

Coordinates: 52°46′9.92″N 1°12′37.66″W

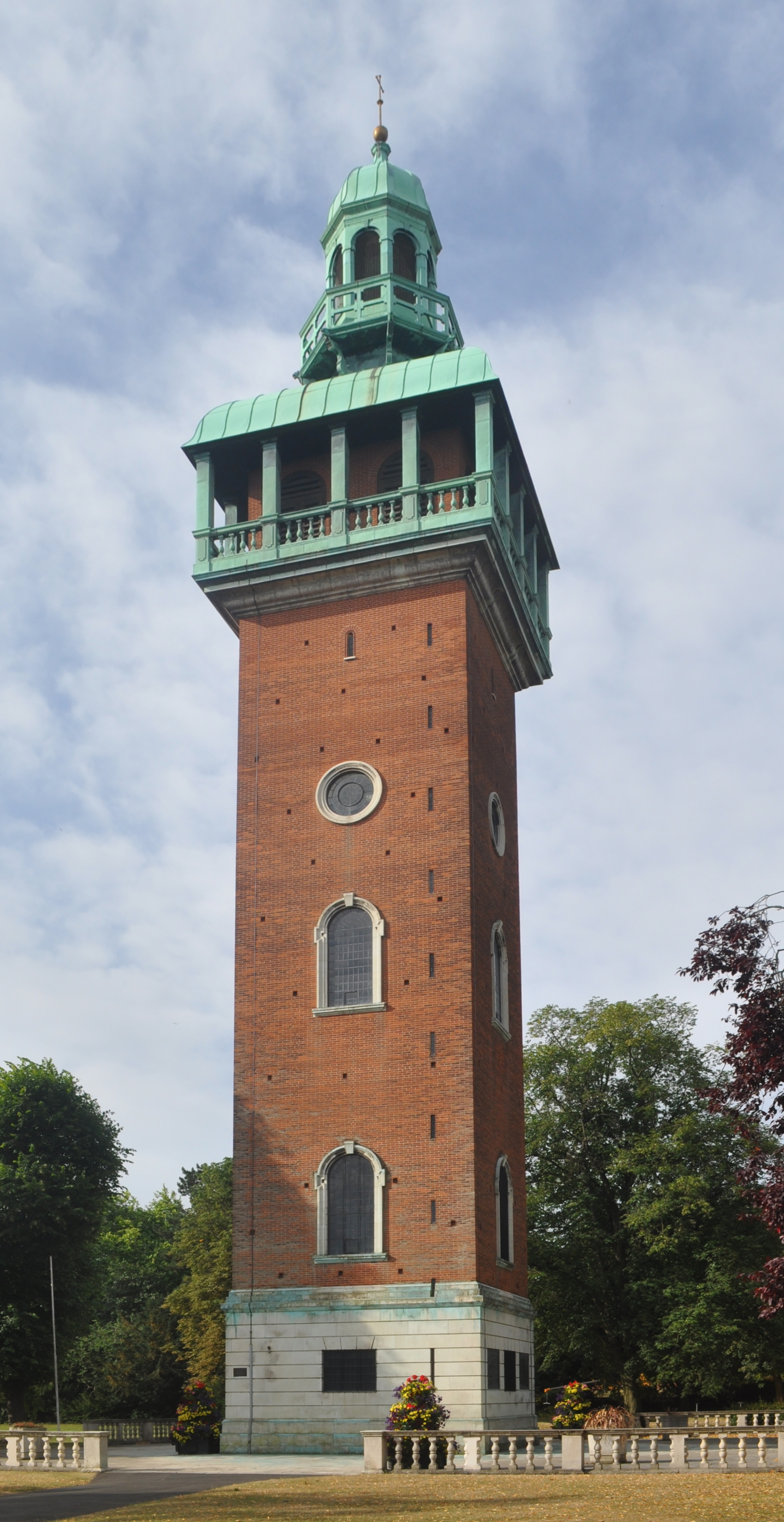
The Loughborough Carillon seen from Queen's Park

The Loughborough Carillon is a carillon tower and war memorial in Loughborough, England. It is in Queen's Park, and is a well-known landmark, visible from several miles away. It is 152 feet (46 m) high.

Plans were finalised in 1919 and when completed in 1923 it was the first four-octave carillon in England, the concept being associated with Belgium where so many British servicemen lost their lives during the 1914–1918 Great War. The Carillon was designed by Sir Walter Tapper, and is now grade II listed. The carillon has 47 bells, all of which were cast at John Taylor Bell Foundry in Loughborough. The carillon was built by William Moss and Sons Ltd of Loughborough.

The dedication was held on Sunday 22 July 1923, led by Theodore Woods, Bishop of Peterborough, and Field-Marshal William Robertson. The carillon was played by city carillonneur Jef Denyn, and the service included a piece Memorial Chimes composed by Edward Elgar for the occasion - the manuscript of which, donated to Charnwood Borough Council in the 1950s, was rediscovered in 2012.

There are recitals every Thursday (1300 till 1400) and Sunday (1300 till 1400) throughout the summer.

The Carillon is a grade II listed building.

== War Memorial Museum ==
The tower features the War Memorial Museum, with three floors of military memorabilia. Exhibits include artifacts from each of the armed forces and both World Wars.

Access up the tower is via a long spiral staircase, which precludes disabled access except to the ground floor.

== The bells ==
Bell	Weight	
Bell	hundredweights-quarters-pounds	(metric equivalent)
Treble	0-0-14	(6 kg)
2	0-0-13	(6 kg)
3	0-0-13	(6 kg)
4	0-0-12	(5 kg)
5	0-0-15	(7 kg)
6	0-0-15	(7 kg)
7	0-0-13	(6 kg)
8	0-0-12	(5 kg)
9	0-0-16	(7 kg)
10	0-0-18	(8 kg)
11	0-0-19	(9 kg)
12	0-0-24	(11 kg)
13	0-0-27	(12 kg)
14	0-1-4	(15 kg)
15	0-1-8	(16 kg)
16	0-1-15	(20 kg)
17	0-1-16	(20 kg)
18	0-1-20	(22 kg)
19	0-2-9	(29 kg)
20	0-2-20	(34 kg)
21	0-3-16	(45 kg)
22	1-0-2	(52 kg)
23	1-0-21	(60 kg)
24	1-1-16	(71 kg)
25	1-2-23	(87 kg)
26	1-3-8	(93 kg)
27	2-0-6	(104 kg)
28	2-1-10	(119 kg)
29	2-3-13	(146 kg)
30	3-2-4	(180 kg)
31	3-3-25	(202 kg)
32	4-3-17	(249 kg)
33	5-1-9	(271 kg)
34	6-0-14	(311 kg)
35	7-1-8	(372 kg)
36	8-3-8	(448 kg)
37	10-1-24	(532 kg)
38	12-1-23	(633 kg)
39	15-1-16	(782 kg)
40	17-3-21	(911 kg)
41	21-2-0	(1092 kg)
42	25-3-25	(1320 kg)
43	31-0-0	(1575 kg)
44	34-1-6	(1743 kg)
45	40-3-25	(2082 kg)
46	60-1-6	(3064 kg)
Bourdon	82-3-16	(4211 kg)

== In popular culture ==
The song "Loughborough Suicide" by Indie group Young Knives starts with the line "I looked down from the carillon".

One of the bells in the tower was used to record the start of the song "Hells Bells (song)" by hard rock band AC/DC.

== See also ==
- List of carillons of the British Isles
