= Gillett & Johnston =

English clockmaker and bell foundry

- Type: Private
- Industry: Bell and clock manufacturing
- Founded: 1844
- Founder: William Gillett
- Headquarters: Croydon, Surrey, UK
- Area served: Global
- Products: Bells, tower clocks, carillons

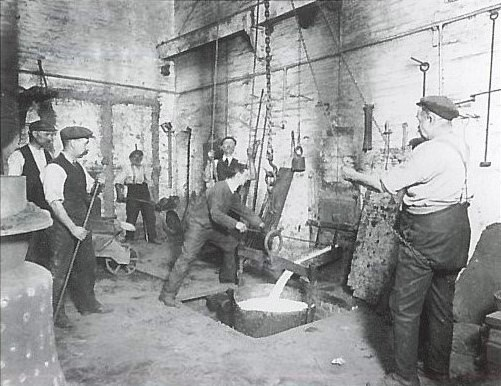
Gillett & Johnston's bell foundry, c.1920, showing molten metal being poured into a crucible

Gillett & Johnston was a clockmaker and bell foundry based in Croydon, England from 1844 until 1957. Between 1844 and 1950, over 14,000 tower clocks were made at the works. The company's most successful and prominent period of activity as a bellfounder was in the 1920s and 1930s, when it was responsible for supplying many important bells and carillons for sites across Britain and around the world.

A successor company continues operation in Bletchingley, Surrey, under the Gillett & Johnston name, engaged in clock-making and clock and carillon repair.

== History ==
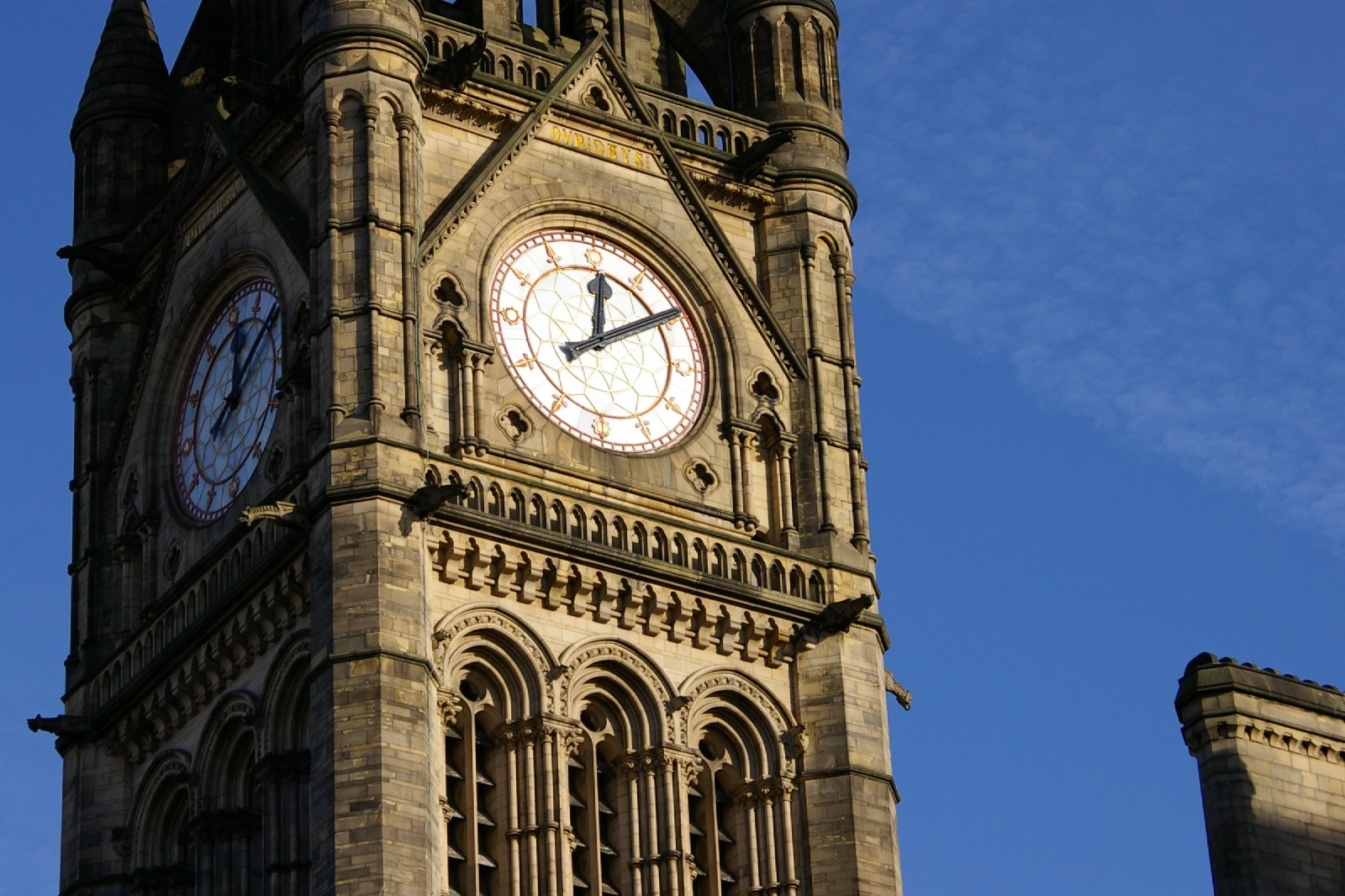
Clock on Manchester Town Hall made by Gillett & Bland, predecessor to Gillett & Johnston, in 1879

The company traced its roots to a clockmaking business established by William Gillett in Hadlow, Kent, in the early 19th century. In 1837, Gillett moved his business to Clerkenwell, London; and in 1844 to the site in what later became known as Union Road, West Croydon, which would remain its home for the next 113 years. Charles Bland became a partner in 1854, and the company subsequently traded as Gillett & Bland. In 1877, Arthur A. Johnston (c.1851–1916) bought a partnership, and shortly afterwards extended the company's output by establishing a bell foundry. The business became known as Gillett, Bland & Co until Bland's death in c.1884, when the name was changed to Gillett & Co. The name Gillett & Johnston seems to have been used from around 1887.

Arthur Johnston's son, Cyril Frederick Johnston (1884–1950), joined the company in 1902, became a partner in 1907, and took over the firm following his father's death in 1916. He developed an interest in the theory of bell-tuning, and greatly expanded the bellfounding side of the business. In 1905 he redeveloped the works, and installed a large vertical tuning lathe. He was particularly interested in the manufacture of carillons, which presented special problems of tuning distinct from those of church bells.

During the First World War, the factory suspended its regular business and became involved in the manufacture of munitions, employing over 1,250 men and women.

The firm became a limited liability company in 1925, initially trading as the Croydon Bell Foundry Ltd (although the name "Gillett and Johnston" still appeared on bells). It reverted to the name Gillett & Johnston Ltd in 1930.

Cyril Johnston resigned as managing director in 1948, following disagreements over company policy, and died suddenly two years later in 1950. Following his departure, Henry Michael Howard took over, and some bells were cast in his name. The business also now diversified into other engineering activities, and new subsidiaries (Microcastings Ltd and Bourdon Tools Ltd) were established. However, it experienced financial difficulties, caused in part by changing architectural tastes, and a falling-off in demand for traditional tower clocks and cast bells. In 1957 the business was taken into receivership and the works were closed down.

== Successor company ==
The business was sold in 1958 to the Bath Portland Group, which already owned Synchronome, a rival office clockmaking company. For a few years, the tower clock side was established in Wembley as Gillett-Johnston Clocks Ltd. In 1962 it was bought by Cecil Hector Coombes (d. 1972), who had previously worked for Gillett & Johnston in Croydon. He returned the firm to Croydon in 1963 as Gillett and Johnston (Croydon) Ltd, basing it first in Clarendon Road (1963–1970), and then in Sanderstead Road (1970–2012). In 2012 the company moved to new premises in Bletchingley, Surrey. It remains in the Coombes family, and undertakes clockmaking, and the restoration and maintenance of tower clocks, carillons and bells.

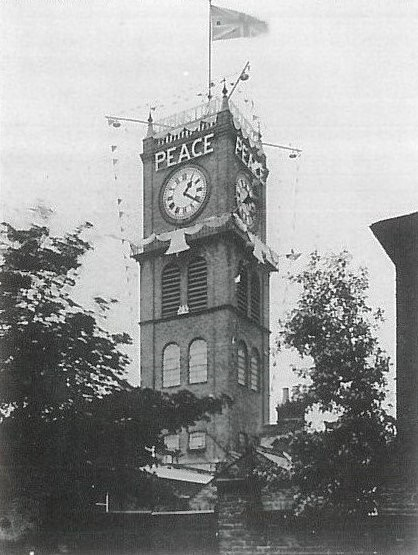
The Gillett & Johnston clocktower in Union Road, decorated for peace celebrations in 1919 at the end of the First World War

== Union Road site ==
The company occupied the same site in Union Road, off Whitehorse Road, West Croydon, from 1844 until the closure of the works in 1957. In 1868 a tall clock tower was built as a "working advertisement", and to provide a facility in which newly cast bells could be tested: this became a prominent local landmark. Each of the four clockfaces was different and unique. A carillon manufactured by the company was installed in the tower in 1920. After the company's closure in 1957, the premises were given over to other industrial uses. The main buildings, including the clock tower, were eventually demolished in 1997, the clockfaces having been removed and placed in storage. After some years standing vacant, part of the foundry building found a new purchaser in 2003 to become a church of the Emmanuel Inspirational Church of God. The greater part of the site is now occupied by a self-storage facility.

The "Mail Coach" pub on the corner of Union Road and Whitehorse Road was renamed "Ye Olde Clocktower" in memory of the firm and its works.

== Archives ==
Surviving records of the foundry include a register of bells cast, 1877–1919; notes relating to work on bells, 1879–1907; and 17 volumes of bell tuning books, 1907–1951. They are now held at the Museum of Croydon (ref. AR 1).

== Notable commissions ==
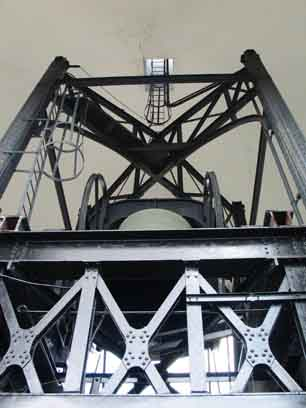
The John Wanamaker Memorial Founder's Bell, Philadelphia, cast in 1926

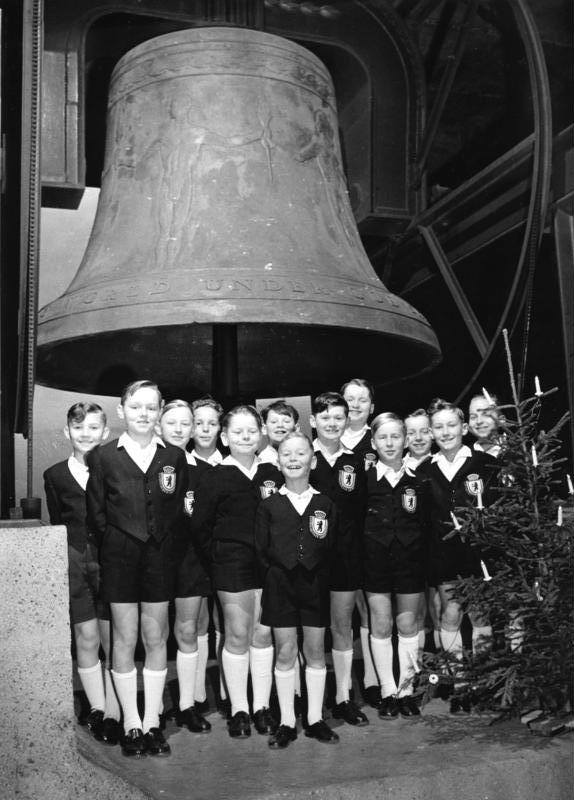
Schoolchildren posing in 1958 beneath the Freedom Bell, Berlin, cast by Gillett & Johnston in 1950

=== Bells ===
- Ring of 9 bells for Reading Town Hall, Berkshire, 1879–1881. Supplied by Gillett, Bland and Co.
- Chime of 8 bells for St Bartholomew's Church, Dublin, 1881. Supplied by Gillett, Bland and Co.
- Ring of 3 bells for Old City Hall, Toronto, Ontario, Canada, 1900. By Gillett and Johnston
- Ring of 10 bells for Wimborne Minster, Dorset, 1911. The original brief was for the restoration of the historic ring of 8 bells, but Cyril Johnston persuaded the incumbent that the ring needed to be entirely recast.
- Ring of 10 bells for St Peter's, South Croydon, Surrey, 1912. Tenor weight 30 Cwt very similar to Wimborne Minster and in the same key of D. Cyril Johnston was a ringer at this tower as was Ronald Dove (Dove's Guide)
- Carillon for Gillett & Johnston's own clocktower, Union Road, Croydon, 1920.
- Carillon of 23 bells for the Metropolitan United Church, Toronto, Ontario, Canada, 1921. The carillon has since been enlarged by two other foundries in 1960 and 1971, and now numbers 54 bells.
- Carillon of 23 bells for the Atkinsons Building, London, 1925–1928. One bell replaced in 1932.
- The John Wanamaker Memorial Founder's Bell, a 16-ton tuned bell originally in the Wanamaker Building and now in the Lincoln-Liberty Building, Philadelphia, commissioned by Rodman Wanamaker in 1925 as a memorial to his father, John. At the time of its casting in 1926 it was the world's largest tuned bell. Originally it could be swung on special occasions; today a large hammer is used to strike the hours. Leopold Stokowski was one of the many admirers of its tone.
- Carillon of 53 bells for the Peace Tower, Parliament Hill, Ottawa, Ontario, Canada, 1926.
- Carillon of 23 bells for 24 Old Bond Street, London, UK, 1927
- Ring of bells for Coventry Cathedral, 1927. The bells survived the bombing of the cathedral in 1940.
- The Laura Spelman Rockefeller memorial carillon of 74 bells at the Riverside Church, New York City, 1928. The carillon contains the largest tuned bell in the world. The Low C "bourdon" of the carillon weighs 20 tons. This particular bell is the largest that has ever been cast in Britain.
- Carillon for Louvain University Library, 1928.
- Carillon of 49 bells for the National War Memorial, Wellington, New Zealand, 1929. Ring of 10 bells cast for St Andrews, Leyland, Lancashire
- The Laura Spelman Rockefeller memorial carillon of 72 bells for Rockefeller Chapel, University of Chicago, 1930. The 18 ton “Db” bourdon of this carillon is supposedly the second largest bell ever cast in Britain, behind its sibling bell in New York City.
- Recasting of "Bow Bells" (church of St Mary-le-Bow), London, 1933. These bells were destroyed by enemy action in 1941.
- Carillon for Bournville, Birmingham, 1934.
- Ring of 5 bells for the T & G Building, Napier, New Zealand, 1936.
- Ring of 12 bells for Croydon Parish Church (now Croydon Minster), 1936.
- Recasting of 10 bells for St Philip's Cathedral, Birmingham, 1937. A further two treble bells were cast in 1949.
- The Freedom Bell, Rathaus Schöneberg, Berlin, Germany, 1950. The 10-ton bell was a gift from Americans to the city of Berlin as a symbol of anti-communism.
- The carillon of 36 bells in the tower of the Kirk of St Nicholas in Aberdeen was replaced with 47 bells in 1950.
- Carillon for the Beaumont Tower, Michigan State University, 1957. This was the firm's last bell installation: the final 4 basses were cast at the foundry of John Taylor & Co, Loughborough, but tuned by Gillett & Johnston.

=== Clocks ===
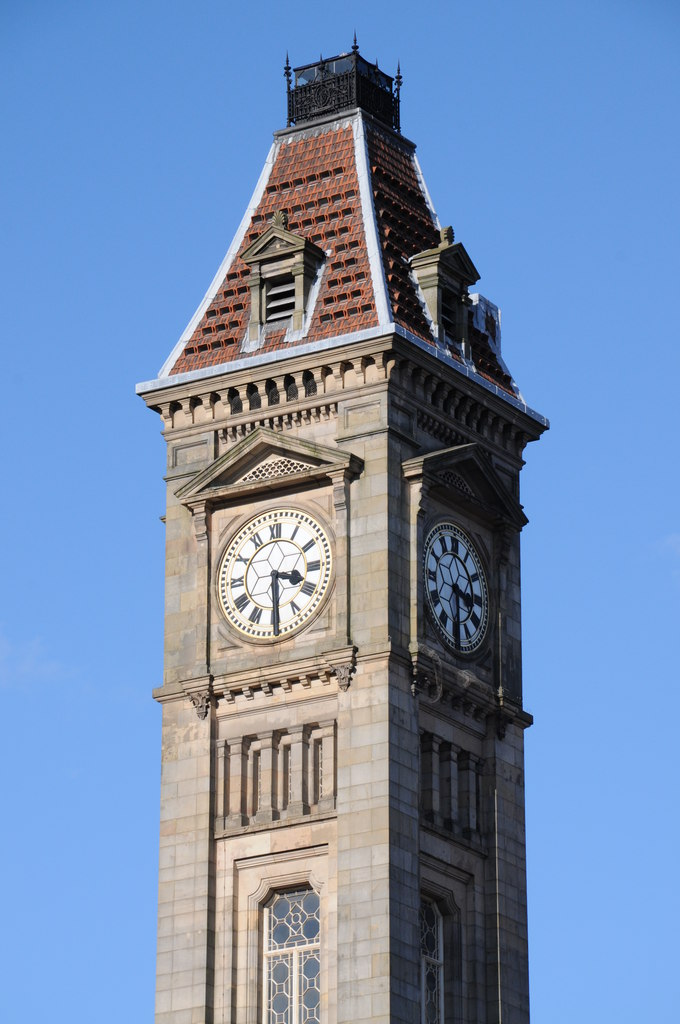
Clock on Birmingham Council House, made by Gillett & Co., 1885

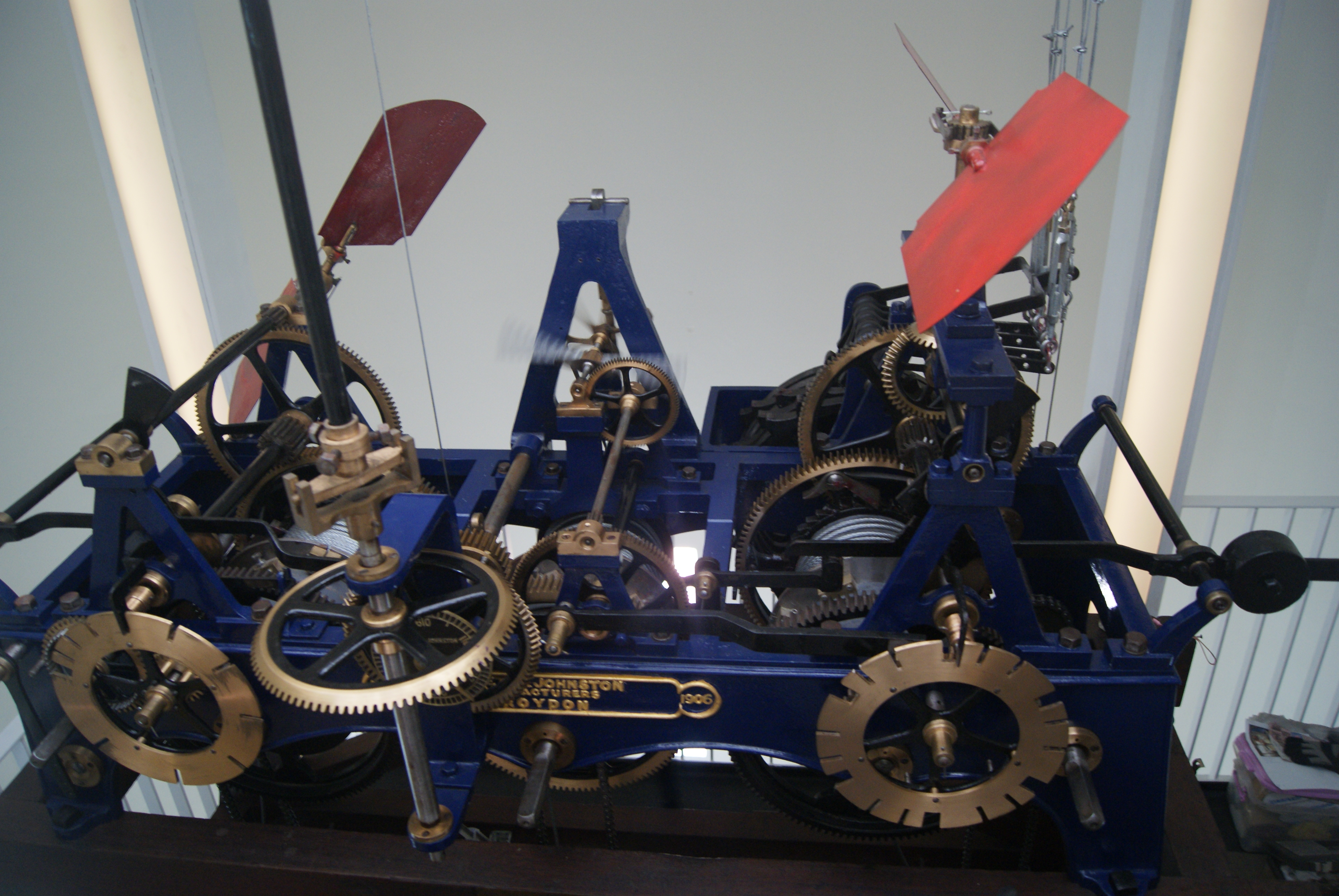
Gillett & Johnston clock movement, Victoria Theatre and Concert Hall, Singapore, 1906.

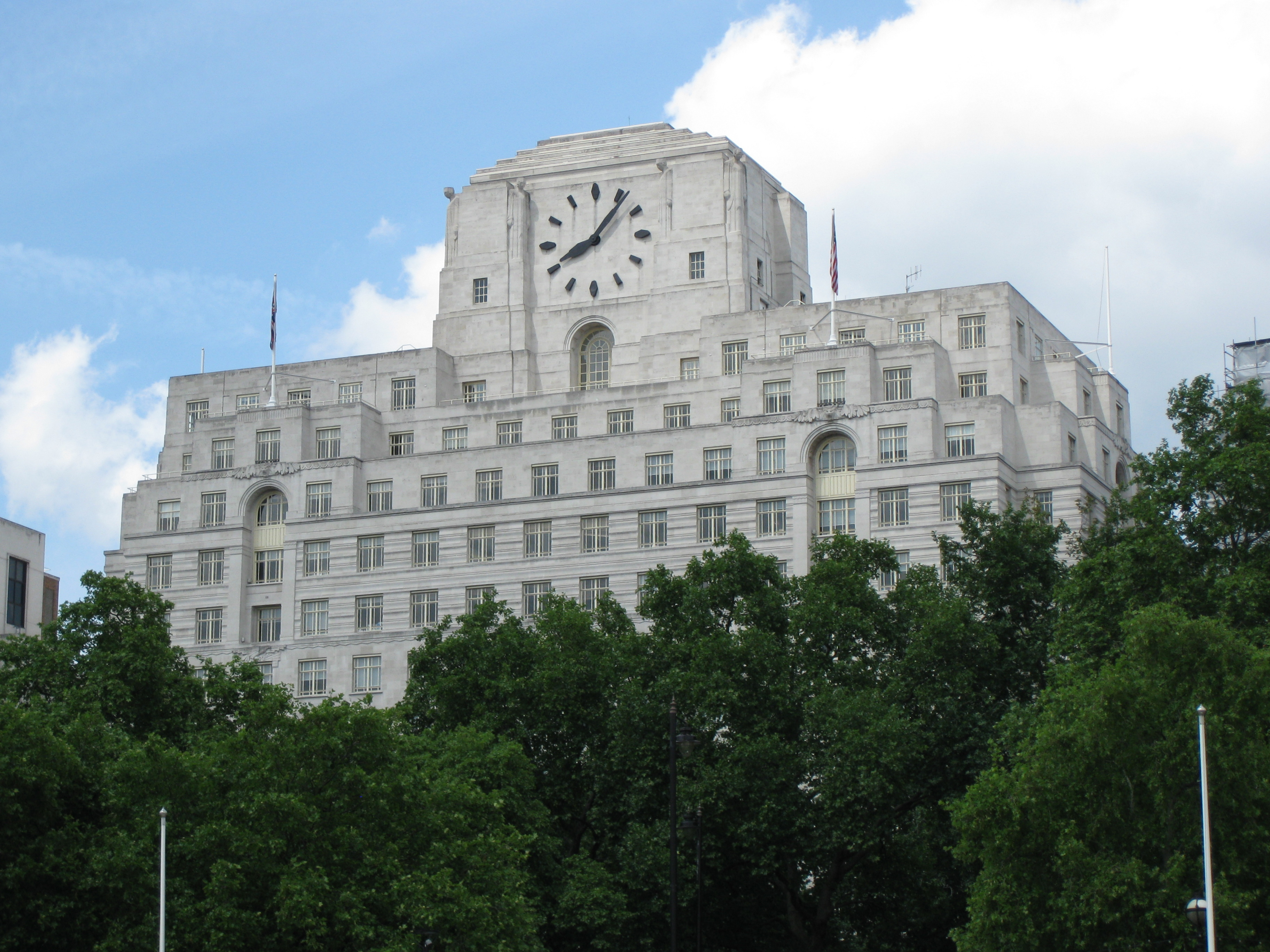
Clock on Shell Mex House, London, made by Gillett & Johnston, 1932

- Clock and carillon machine for St Patrick's Cathedral, Dublin, 1864.
- Clock and carillon for St Botolph's Church, Boston, 1868. By Gillett & Bland.
- Clock for Portsmouth Parish Church (now Portsmouth Cathedral), 1869. By Gillett & Bland.
- Clock and carillon machine for St John's Church, Croydon (now called Croydon Minster), 1870. By Gillett & Bland.
- Clock for Sarajevo Clock Tower, Sarajevo, 1873. By Gillett & Bland.
- Clock and carillon machine for Bradford Town Hall, 1873. By Gillett & Bland.
- Clock currently atop the Chennai Central Railway Station, c. 1873. By Gillett & Bland.
- Clock for Royal Military Academy, Woolwich, 1874. By Gillett & Bland.
- Clock for the Great Eastern Railway Station, Liverpool Street, 1875. By Gillett & Bland.
- Clock for St Wulfram's Church, Grantham 1876-77
- Clock for Lowther Castle stable block, 1877, By Gillett & Bland.
- Clock for the Cathedral of the Immaculate Conception, Sligo, 1877. By Gillett & Bland.
- Clock and carillon machine for Eaton Hall, Cheshire, 1877. By Gillett & Bland.
- Clock and carillon machine for Christ Church Cathedral, Dublin, 1878. By Gillett & Bland.
- Clock for Fredericton City Hall, New Brunswick, Canada, 1878. By Gillett & Bland.
- Clock and carillon machine for Manchester Town Hall, Manchester, 1879. By Gillett & Bland.
- Clock and carillon machine for Reading Town Hall, 1879. By Gillett & Bland.
- New movement for the Hampton Court astronomical clock, 1879. By Gillett & Bland.
- Clock for Chorley Town Hall, 1879. By Gillett, Bland & Co.
- Clock and carillon machine for Llandaff Cathedral, 1879. By Gillett, Bland & Co.
- Clock for Bridlington Priory 1880 By Gillett, Bland & Co.
- Clock for Dunedin Town Hall, New Zealand, 1880. By Gillett, Bland & Co.
- New movement for the Wells Cathedral astronomical clock, 1880. By Gillett, Bland & Co.
- Clock for Lampeter Town Hall, 1881. By Gillett, Bland & Co.
- Clock for Paisley Town Hall, 1881. By Gillett, Bland & Co.
- Clock for St James's Palace, 1882.
- Clock for the Royal Courts of Justice, London, 1883. By Gillett, Bland & Co.
- Clock for the old Town Hall (now Post Office), Durban, South Africa, 1883. By Gillett, Bland & Co.
- Clock for Sydney Town Hall, Australia, 1884. By Gillett, Bland & Co.
- Clock for Craig-y-Nos Castle, Powys, 1884.
- Clock for Barrow-in-Furness Town Hall, 1884. By Gillett & Co.
- New movement for the Exeter Cathedral astronomical clock, 1885.
- Clock for Birmingham Council House, 1885. By Gillett & Co.
- Clock for Birkenhead Town Hall, 1886. By Gillett & Co.
- Clock for Estação Cultura railway station, Campinas, Brazil, 1888.
- Clock for St Barnabas Church, Oxford, 1890. By Gillett & Johnston.
- Clock for Hymers College, Hull, 1893. By Gillett and Johnston.
- Clock for Royal Memorial Church of St George, Cannes, 1893. By Gillett and Johnston.
- Clock for Croydon Town Hall, 1896. By Gillett and Johnston.
- Clock for St Mary's Church, Banbury, 1897. By Gillett and Johnston.
- Clock for Sultan Abdul Samad Clock Tower, Kuala Lumpur, Malaysia, 1897. By Gillett & Johnston (Croydon) Ltd.
- Clock and carillon for Pietermaritzburg City Hall, 1899. By Gillett and Johnston.
- Clock for Old City Hall, Toronto, Ontario, Canada, 1900. By Gillett and Johnston.
- Clock for Royal Arsenal Co-operative Society Central Stores, Woolwich, 1903. By Gillett and Johnston.
- Clock for Castle Drogo stable block, 1905. By Gillett & Johnston.
- Clock for City Hall, Cardiff, 1906. By Gillett & Johnston.
- Clock for Victoria Theatre and Concert Hall, Singapore, 1906. By Gillett & Johnston.
- Clock for Lambeth Town Hall, c.1908. By Gillett and Johnston.
- Clock for City Hall, Krugersdorp, South Africa, 1908. By Gillett & Johnston.
- Clock for Lancaster Town Hall, 1909. By Gillett and Johnston.
- Clock for Launceston General Post Office. By Gillet and Johnston
- Clock for Birch Memorial Clock Tower, Perak, Malaysia, 1909. By Gillett & Johnston.
- Clock for Torre Monumental, Buenos Aires, 1916.
- Clock for Montreal Clock Tower, Montreal, 1922. By Gillett & Johnston.
- Clock for Braintree Town Hall, Braintree, 1927. By Croydon Bell Foundry Ltd.
- Clock for Selfridges, Oxford Street, London, 1931.
- Clock for Shell Mex House, London, 1932: the largest public clock in London.
- Clock for Tabriz City Hall, Tabriz, Iran, 1934. By Gillett and Johnston.
- Clock for Luton Town Hall, 1936. By Gillett and Johnston.
- Clock for Cairo University, 1937. By Gillett and Johnston.
- Clock for City Hall, Norwich, 1938. By Gillett and Johnston.
- Clock for Misr Spinning and Weaving Company, El-Mahalla El-Kubra, Egypt, 1947. By Gillett and Johnston.

== Gallery ==
The following pictures are from the Old Port of Montreal clock tower
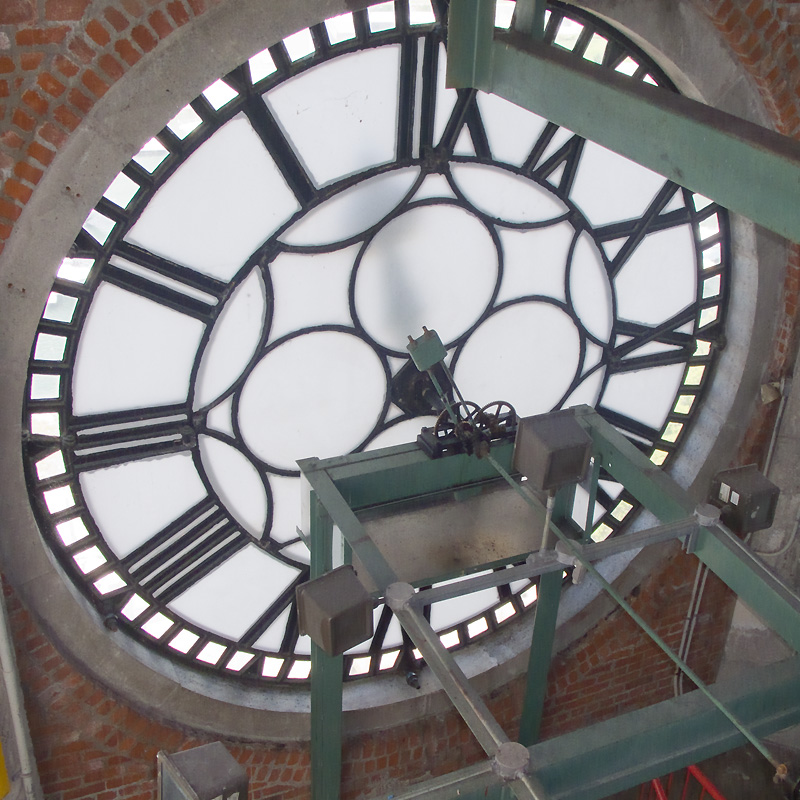
View behind a clock face

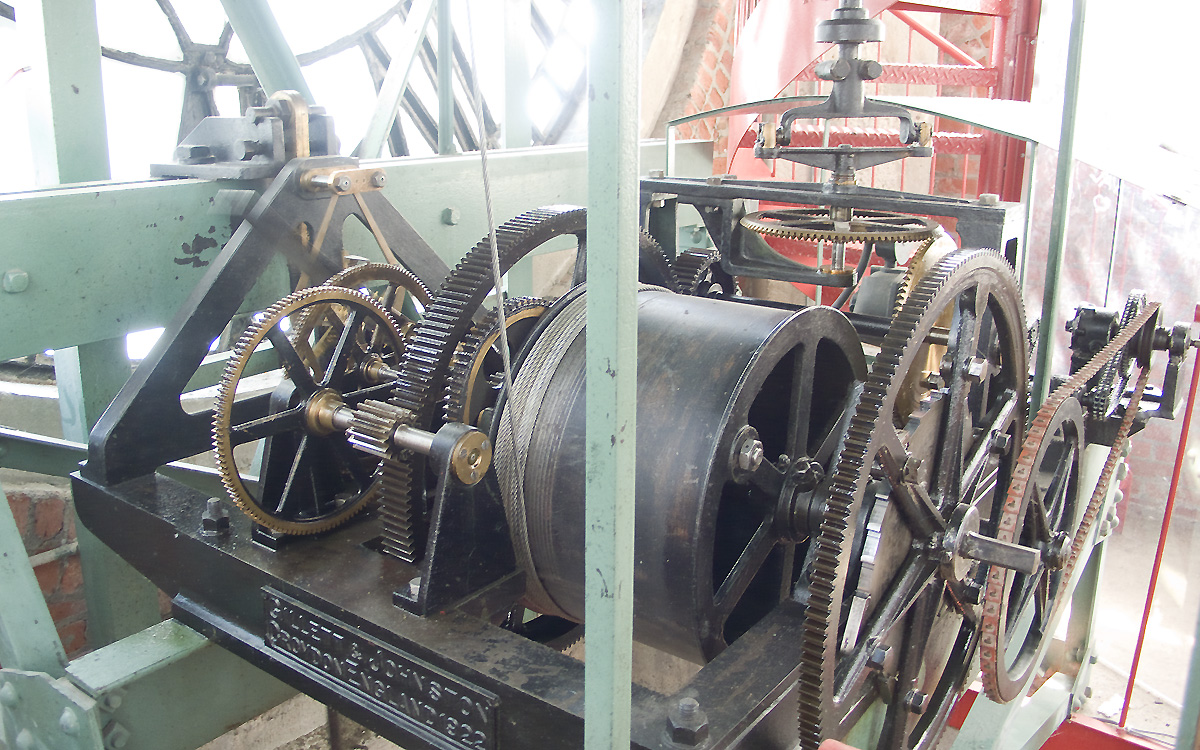
Escapement section with weight cable drum

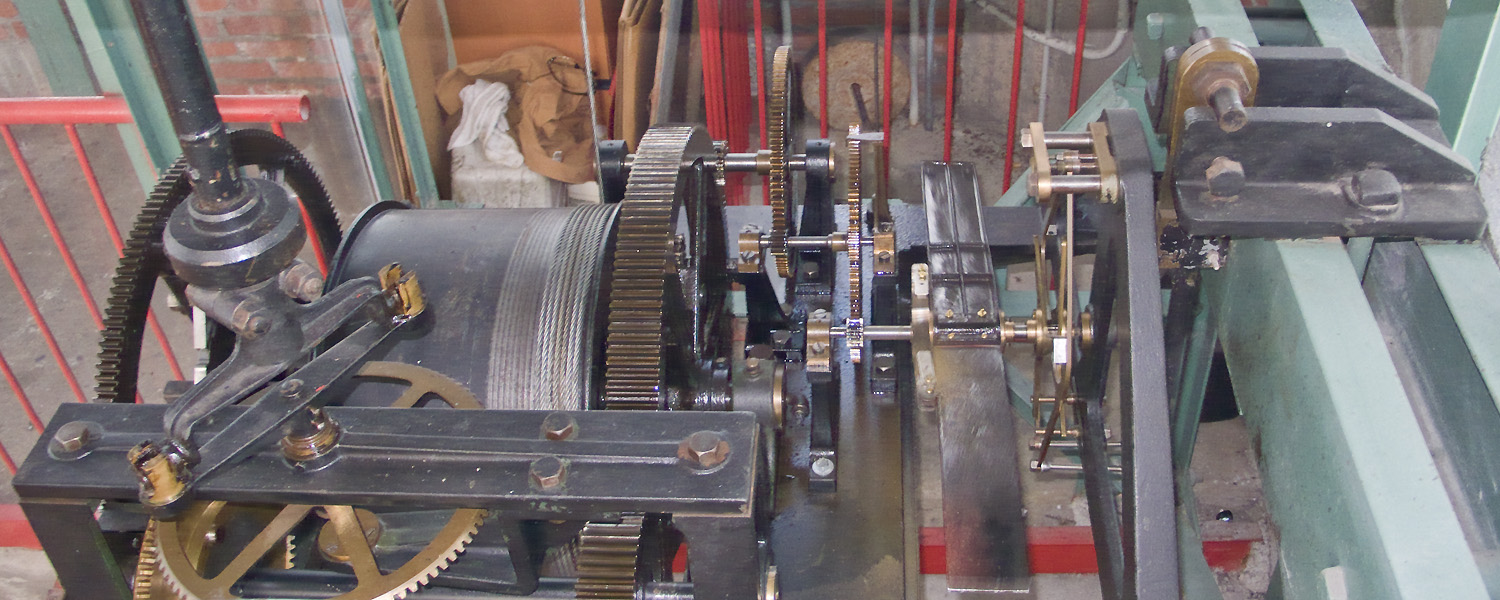
Escapement section with weight cable drum

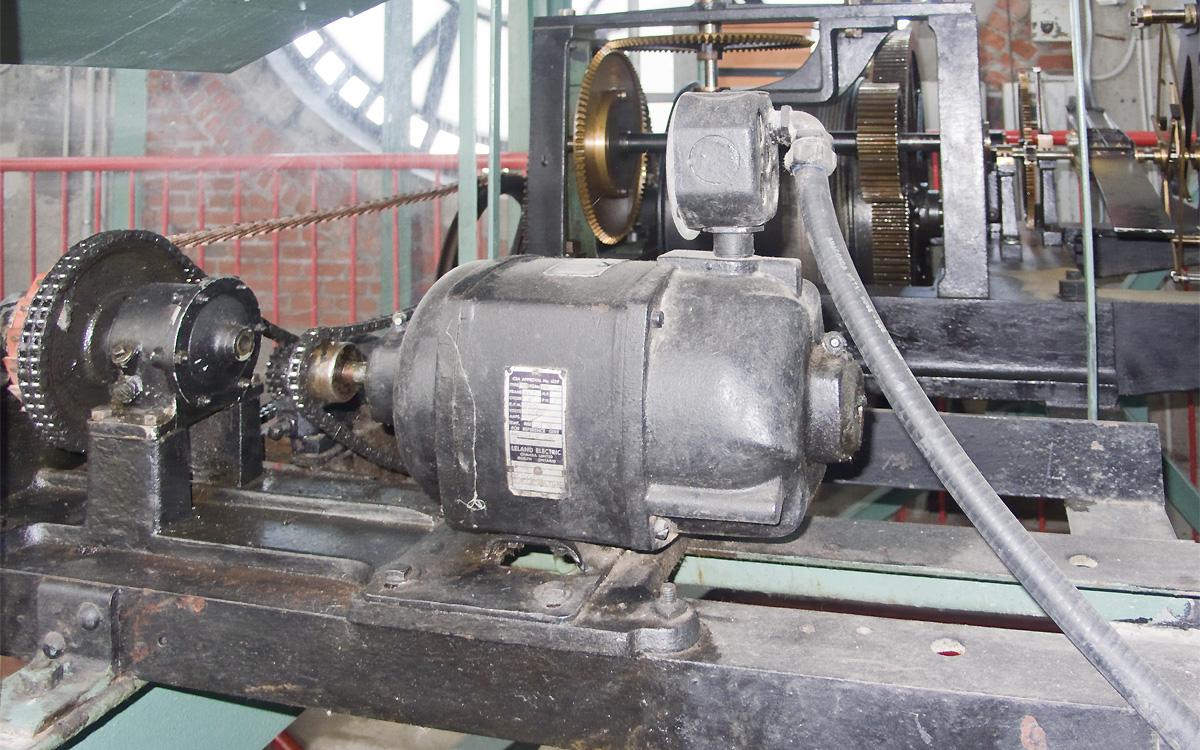
Clock winding motor

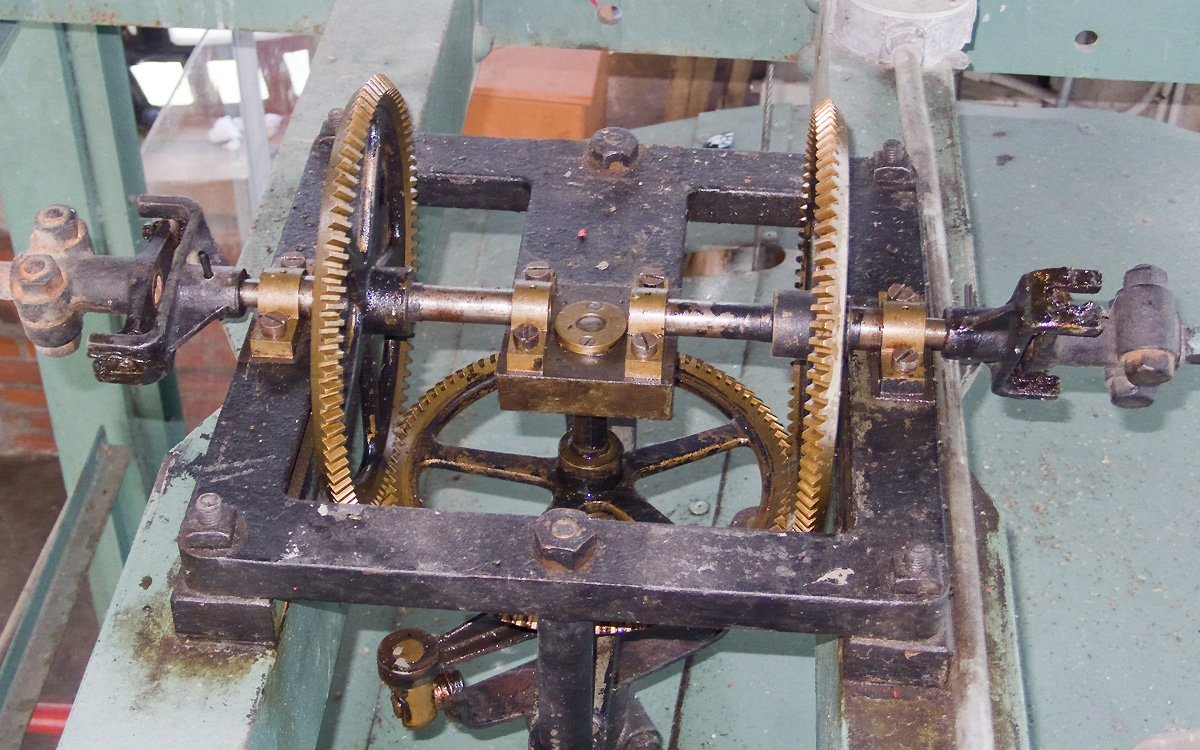
Escapement output

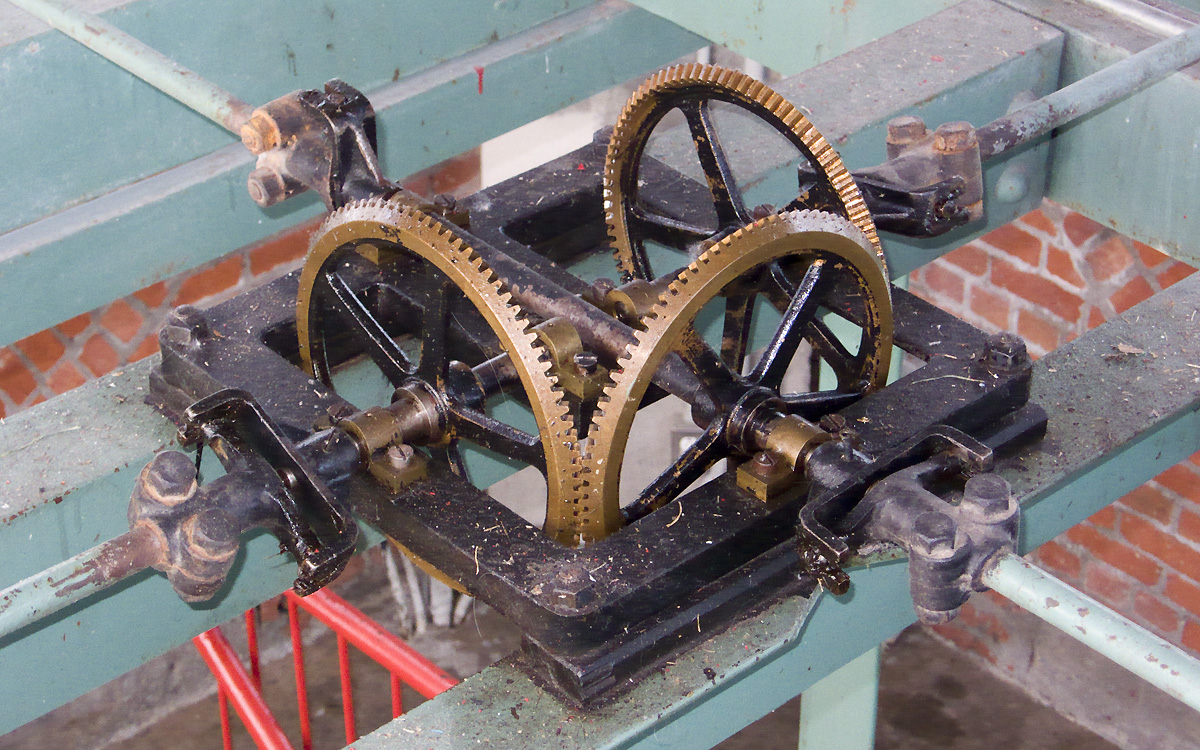
4 faces distributing gears

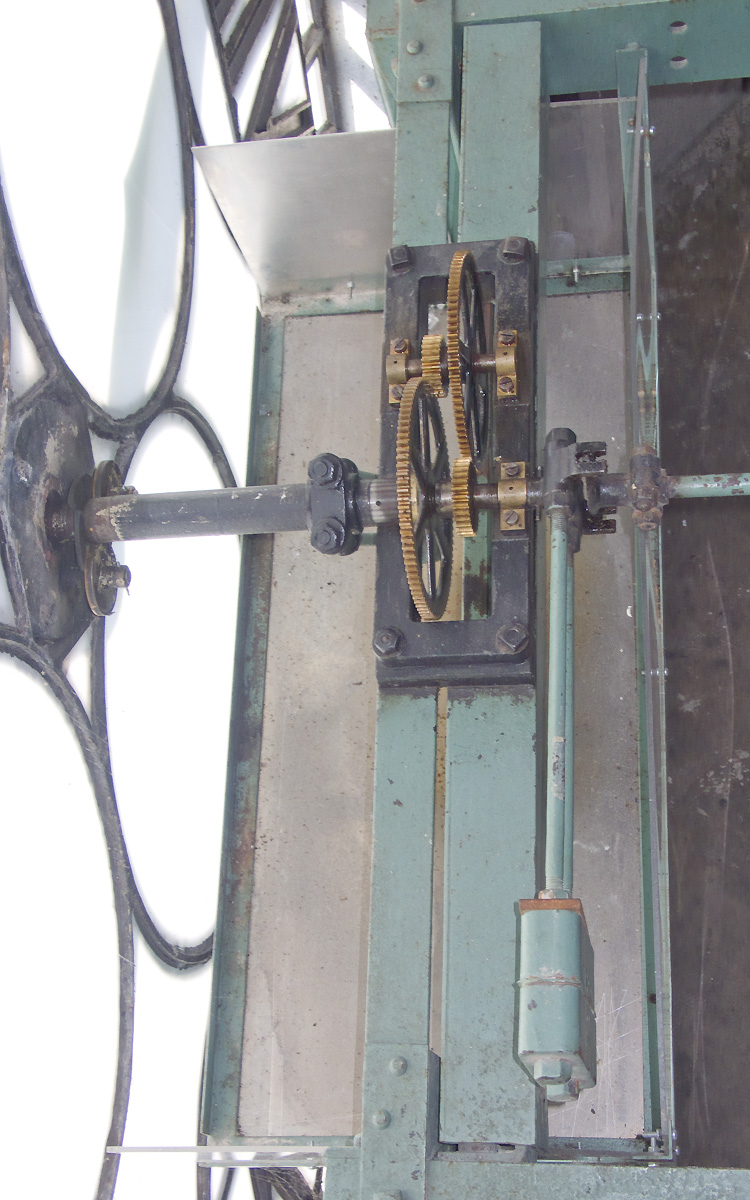
Hours hand downgear & minutes hand counterweight

== Bibliography ==
- Bliss, Mary; Sharpe, Frederick (1986). The Church Bells of Gloucestershire. Gloucester: Alan Sutton. pp. 30–32. ISBN 0900592087.
- Butler, William (2000). Musical Handbells: A Comprehensive History of the Bells and Their Founders. Chichester: Phillimore. pp. 85–87. ISBN 1860771181.
- Dalton, Christopher (2005). The Bells and Belfries of Dorset. Vol. 3. Ullingswick: Upper Court Press. pp. 970–72. ISBN 0953861627.
- Elphick, George P. (1970). Sussex Bells and Belfries. Chichester: Phillimore. pp. 169–75. ISBN 0900592087.
- Johnston, Jill (2008). England's Child: The Carillon and the Casting of Big Bells. San Francisco: Cadmus Editions. ISBN 9780932274717. [primarily a biography of Cyril Johnston, the author's father]
- Sharpe, Frederick (1975). The Church Bells of Herefordshire. Vol. 5. Brackley: Smart & Co. p. 652. ISBN 0950509507.
