= Assamese cuisine =

Culinary tradition of India

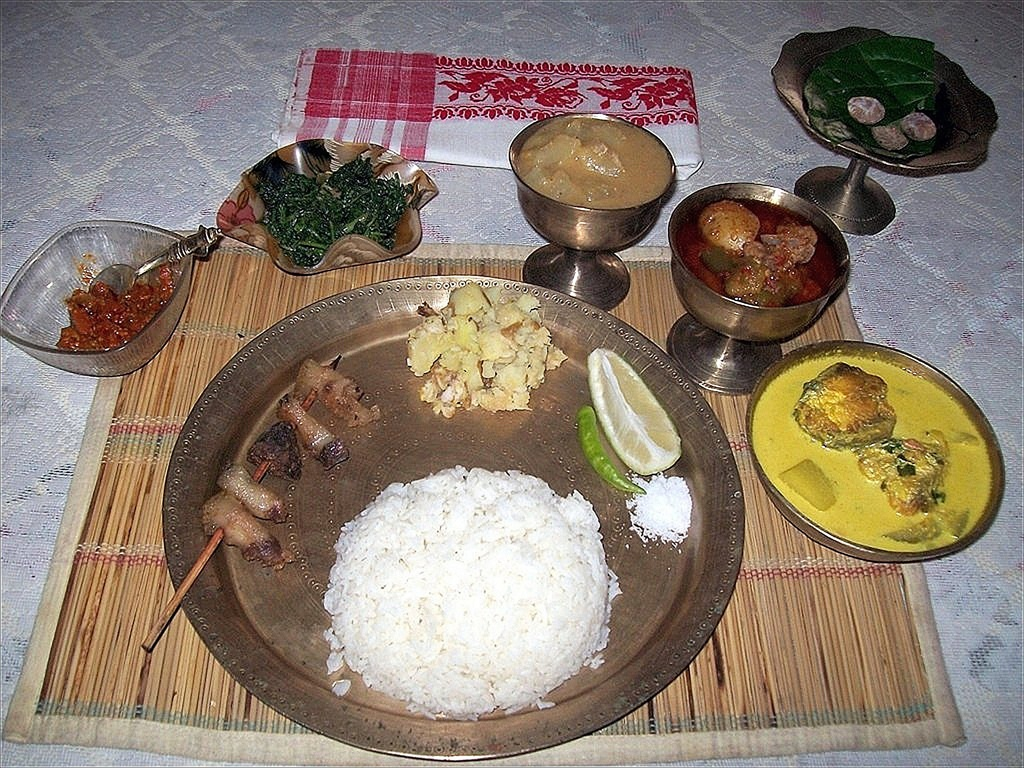
A spread representing Assamese cuisine. It shows sauteed greens, khar, fish, pork, pitika and the kaji lemon wedge, in traditional bell metal utensils. There is no sweet dessert and the meal ends with betel nut chewing.

Assamese cuisine is the cuisine of the Indian state of Assam. It is a style of cooking that is a confluence of cooking habits of the hills that favour fermentation and drying as forms of preservation and those from the plains that provide extremely wide variety of fresh vegetables and greens, and an abundance of fish and meat. Both are centred on the main ingredient — rice.

Assamese cuisine is a mixture of different indigenous styles with considerable regional variations and some external influences. It is characterized by very little use of spices and strong flavor due to the use of endemic exotic fruits and vegetables that are either fresh, dried or fermented.

Fish is widely used, and birds like duck, pigeon, squab, etc. are very popular, which are often paired with a main vegetable or ingredient; beef used to be eaten before British colonialism, and now Muslim communities continue to do so.

Preparations are rarely elaborate. The practice of bhuna, the gentle frying of spices before the addition of the main ingredients so common in Indian cooking, is absent in the cuisine of Assam. The preferred oil for cooking is the pungent mustard oil.

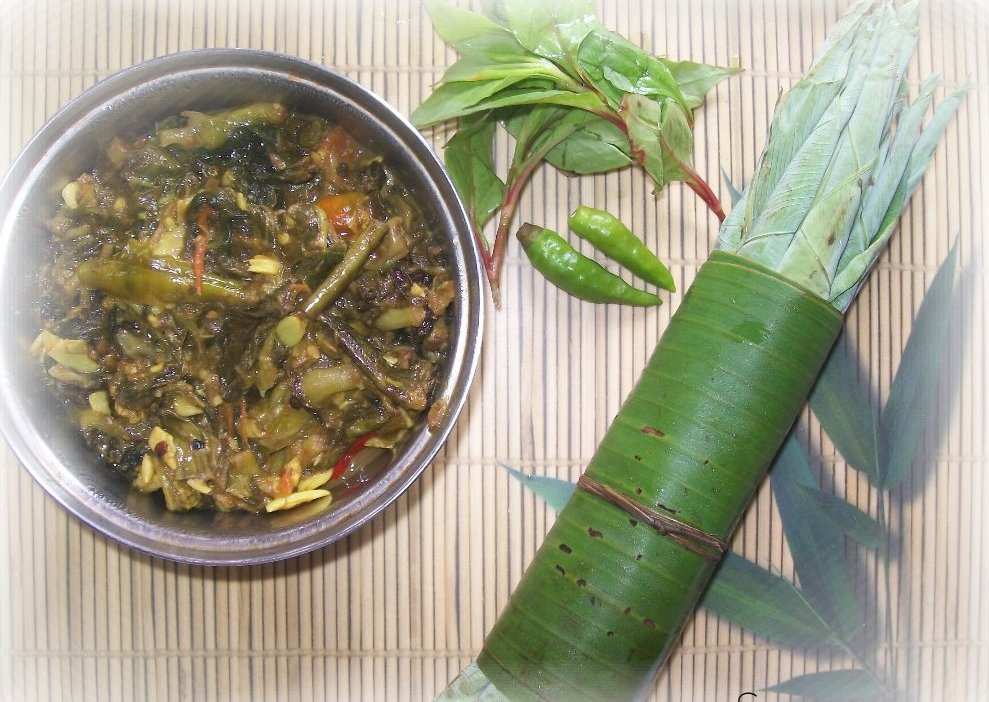
Kosu xaak aru madhuxuleng (Colocasia with Polygonum microcephalum)

A traditional meal in Assam begins with a khar, a class of dishes named after the main ingredient. Another very common dish is tenga, a sour dish. Traditionally, both khar and tenga are not eaten together in the same meal, though it has become common lately. The food is usually served in bell metal utensils made by an indigenous community called Mariya/Moria. Tamul (betel nut, raw or fermented) and paan generally conclude the meal.

Though still obscure, this cuisine has seen wider notice in recent times. The discovery of this cuisine in the popular media continues, with the presenters yet to settle on the language and the specific distinctiveness to describe it.

== Ingredients ==
=== Rice ===
Rice is the most important ingredient in this cuisine. The diversity of rice grown in the region has led to speculation that the grain was first domesticated in the Assam-Yunnan region. Both the indica as well as the japonica varieties are grown in Assam. The most popular class of rice is the joha or scented rice. As a staple, rice is eaten either steam boiled (ukhua) or sundried (aaroi). Some very high quality rice varieties, Karaballam or kauribadam etc., are available in Assam only.

Rice is eaten as a snack in many forms: roasted and ground (xandoh), boiled in its husk and flattened (chira), puffed (akhoi). Kumol saul is rice that is precooked, dried and then husked; it can be simply soaked in warm water and eaten as a light meal.

Rice is a part of all meals in Assam. A traditional breakfast consists of chira with yogurt and jaggery. Typically, farmers eat cooked rice soaked overnight (poita) simply accompanied with salt, mustard oil, onions, etc. Snacks are xandoh, kumol saul or boka saul, sticky rice or bora saul, which can be eaten with sweet or salty accompaniments. For other major meals, rice could be boiled, steamed, or wrapped in leaves and roasted. 'Sunga Saul' is a special preparation in which (sticky) rice (bora saul) is cooked in bamboo hollows called 'sunga'. 'Sewa diya Bhaat' is another preparation where sticky rice is steamed over boiling water. They are generally served with meat or fish. Sticky rice is also wrapped in leaves, usually plantain leaves or tora pat, and dropped into boiling water to prepare tupula bhat.

A special class of rice preparations, called pithas are generally made only on special occasions like the Bihu. Made usually with soaked and ground glutinous rice (bora saul), they could be fried in oil with a sesame filling (xutuli pitha), roasted in young green bamboo over a slow fire (sunga pitha) or baked and rolled over a hot plate with a filling (kholasaporia pitha).

=== Fish ===
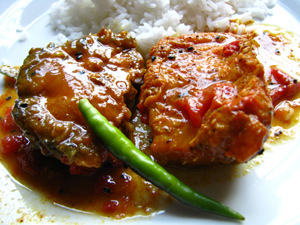
Masor tenga

The next most important ingredient is fish, harvested from the many rivers, ponds and lakes in the region. The extremely wet climate and the large numbers of water bodies has ensured that large varieties of freshwater fish are available in abundance in the valley. It is a staple item in Assamese cuisine. There is no traditional ethnic community in Assam that does not eat fish. Most traditional rural households have their own ponds for pisciculture. Some of the most popular big fishes are the borali (freshwater dhark), rou, and cital (big), khoria (medium) (Chitala chitala), maagur, xingi, borali, bhokua or bahu, xal, and xoul. Small varieties of fish available and eaten in Assam include puthi (swamp barb), ari (long-whiskered catfish), goroi (green snake head/spotted snake head), kawoi (climbing perch; Anabas testudineus), kholihona (Indian paradise fish; Ctenops nobilis) borolia, mua, seniputhi, tengera, lasin, bhangun, and pabho.

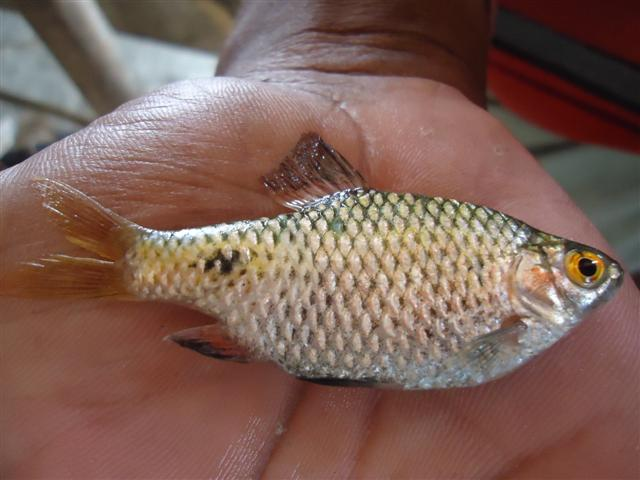
Puthi maas (swamp barb)

The mas tenga (sour fish), which is commonly eaten by most communities of Assam, has lately become a signature dish of Assamese cuisine. The most popular souring agent for the tenga is tomatoes, though ones made with kajinemu juice (thick skinned elongated lemon) and thekera (dried mangosteen), Ou-tenga, teteli, kordoi tenga (south-east Asian starfruit), and tengamora(roselle leaves) are also popular.

The most common way of eating fish in traditional Assamese homes is by preparing a stew with herbs, vegetables, and greens as per preference and availability. Fish is also prepared by roasting or char-grilling. A common favourite dish is a small fish roasted in banana leaves (paatotdia). Hukoti is a special fish dish prepared from dried small fish like (puthi maas) pounded with arum stem and dried and stored in bamboo tubes. Variations of this exist among the ethnic communities of northeast India in general and Assam in particular. Dried and fermented small fish puthy mas (Ticto barb), three to four in number, are roasted with lavish amounts of green chilis, tomatoes, ginger and garlic (all roasted). The ingredients are then pounded in a mortar to make a coarse paste and served with rice. Fish eggs and innards are also cooked and consumed. Petu bhoja (fried fish intestines) is also considered a delicacy along with the traditional Assamese Jal, which is an herbal fish curry made with medicinal herbs like bhedailota (Chinese fever vine), noroxingho (curry leaves), bon dhunia, man dhunia, manimuni (Asiatic Pennywort), tengesi leaves, and more. It is known for its rich flavour and medicinal and antioxidant qualities.

=== Meat ===
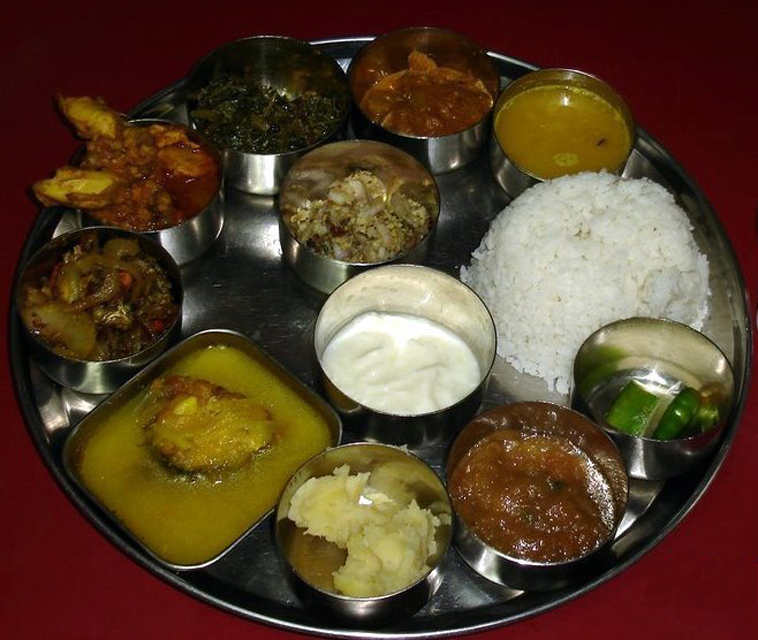

The Assamese meat and fish dishes are characterized by a low amount of spices and oil, higher quantity of ginger, noroxinghow paat (curry leaves), Khorisa (fermented bamboo shoot) and lemon juice, and differ completely in taste from the dishes of neighboring Bengal and are quite similar to the cuisines of nearby South-East Asian and East Asian countries. Chicken, venison, squab, mutton, duck and pork is very popular among the indigenous ethnic Assamese communities like Sonowals, Bodo, Rabha, Keot (Kaibarta), Ahom, Moran, Sutiya etc. Assamese Cast Hindus such as Assamese Brahmins (including Ganaks), Kaibarta, Rajbanshi, Kayasthas of Assam, Kalitas of Lower Assam refrain from pork and beef consumption. Beef is occasionally consumed by Assamese Muslims, although they traditionally refrain from consuming pork. Christians, many indigenous Assamese communities, and the non-religious sections consume all types of meat.

The basic cooking methods include cooking, shallow and deep frying. Onla, of the Bodos, is made with ground rice and special herbs and constitutes a complete meal in itself. Other meats include squab, duck, chicken, goat meat, venison, and turtle although venison and turtle meat are legally prohibited. The combinations of duck and white gourd, and squab and papaya or banana flower is very popular. Meat is generally stewed using limited spices as well as a choice of herbs and vegetables.

Most communities of Assam are entomophagous. Various indigenous ethnic groups of certain areas partake of the silkworm, water bugs, grasshoppers, and other insects. Insects are fried or cooked or roasted in leaves and then prepared according to the timing of the meal. The red ant eggs (amroli poruar tup) is considered a delicacy during the Rongali Bihu festival.

=== Green vegetables ===
The environs of Assam are rich in vegetation, and green leafy vegetables, called xaak, are an important part of the cuisine. Some of them are grown while others like the dhekia (fern) grows wild. There is a bewildering variety that is eaten and according to custom, one has to have 101 different xaak (greens) during Rongali Bihu. Herbs, greens, and vegetables are commonly eaten by simply cooking in water and salt, lightly frying, as a thick soup or by adding to varieties of lentils. They are also prepared in combination with fish, meat and eggs.

A mash roasted wrapped in leaves (Mosundari, Noltenga, and Kochuthor 'Patot Diya Pitika')

=== Spices of Assam ===
Among spices there are ginger, garlic, onion, cumin seed, black cumin, black pepper, chilli, turmeric, coriander seed, cinnamon, cardamom, clove, fenugreek seed, white mustard seed, aniseed, Malabar leaf, etc. Some herbs peculiar to Assam are maan dhaniya, moran Ada, madhuhuleng, bhedai lota, manimuni, masundari, tengesi, thekera, kordoi, outenga, tengamora': etc. An Assamese meal is incomplete without green chilis, many varieties of which are available in the region. Assam is famous for the bhut jolokia or ghost pepper, which was recognized as the hottest chili in the world. Panch-furan (mixture of 5 spices) is used for adding flavour to Dail. Dail was not originally eaten by the indigenous people of Assam, but has slowly been adopted and adapted to local preferences due to external influences.

== Preparations ==
Although the modern cuisine of Assam has been influenced to a small extent by East and North Indian cuisine, Assam has many traditional dishes which are similar to the cuisines of East Asian and South-East Asian nations.

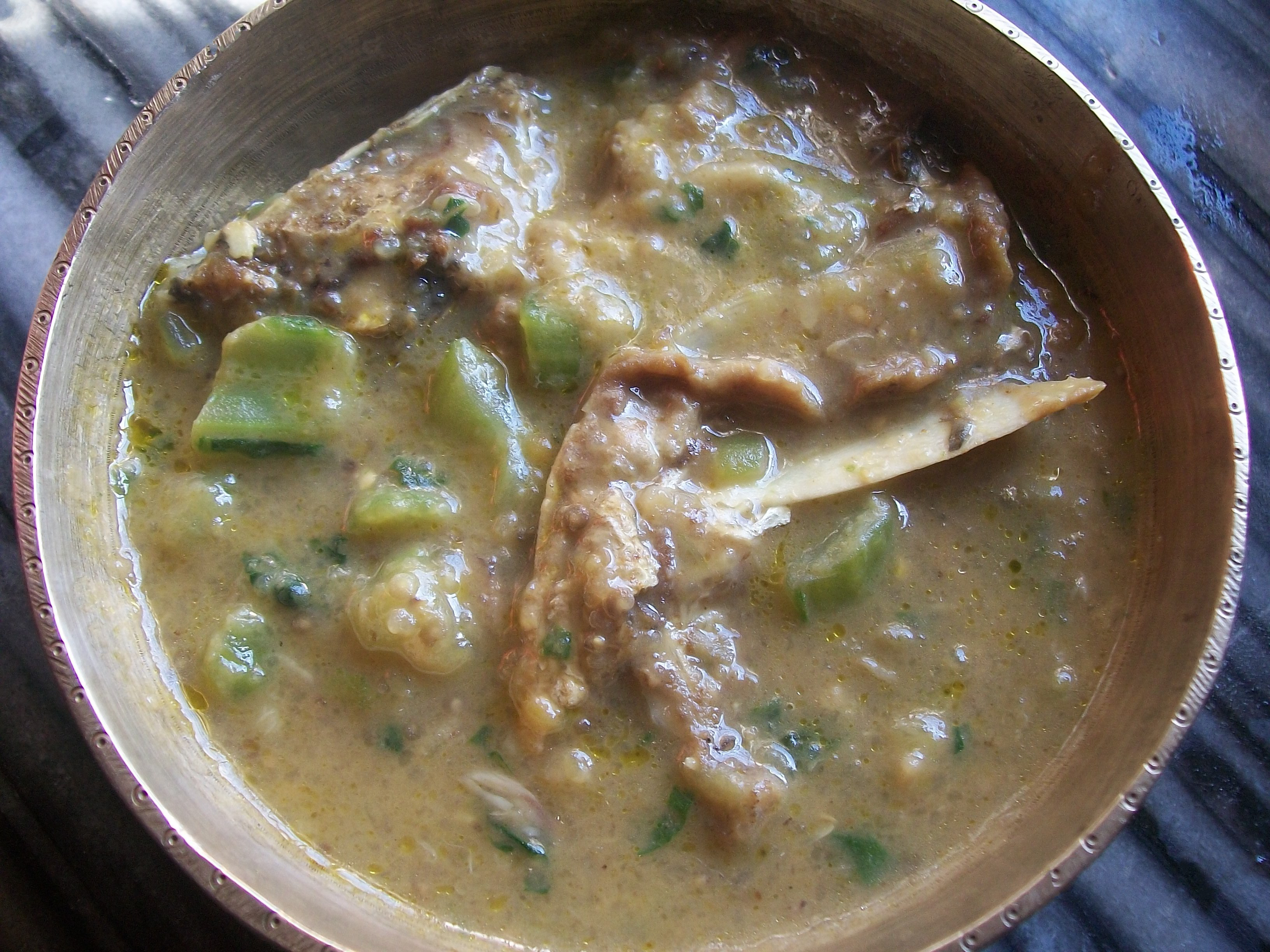
An Assamese 'khar'(Kharwai-a traditional Kachari tribe dish) recipe preparation with rohu fish head

Khar
a signature class of preparations made with a key ingredient, also called khar. The traditional ingredient is made by filtering water through the ashes of the sun-dried skin of a few varieties of banana, which is then called kola khar (The name derived from the local term for banana, "kol" or "kola.") A traditional meal invariably begins with a khar dish, which can be prepared with raw papaya, mustard leaves, vegetables, pulses, fish or any other main ingredient.

Xôkôta
a severely bitter type of preparation. It is prepared with dry jute leaf, urad bean and khar. However, the combination of khar (alkaline) and tenga (acidic) is not recommended. The liquid khar is also simply eaten as kharoli with rice which is prepared by adding a few drops of mustard oil. Assamese people have a peculiar tradition of eating a large variety of bitter dishes, many of which are considered delicacies. Some dishes in this category include, fresh bamboo shoot, cooked or lightly fried, cane shoot, Neem leaves fried, titabhekuri, bitter gourd, Xukuta, Titaphool, Sewali Phool etc.

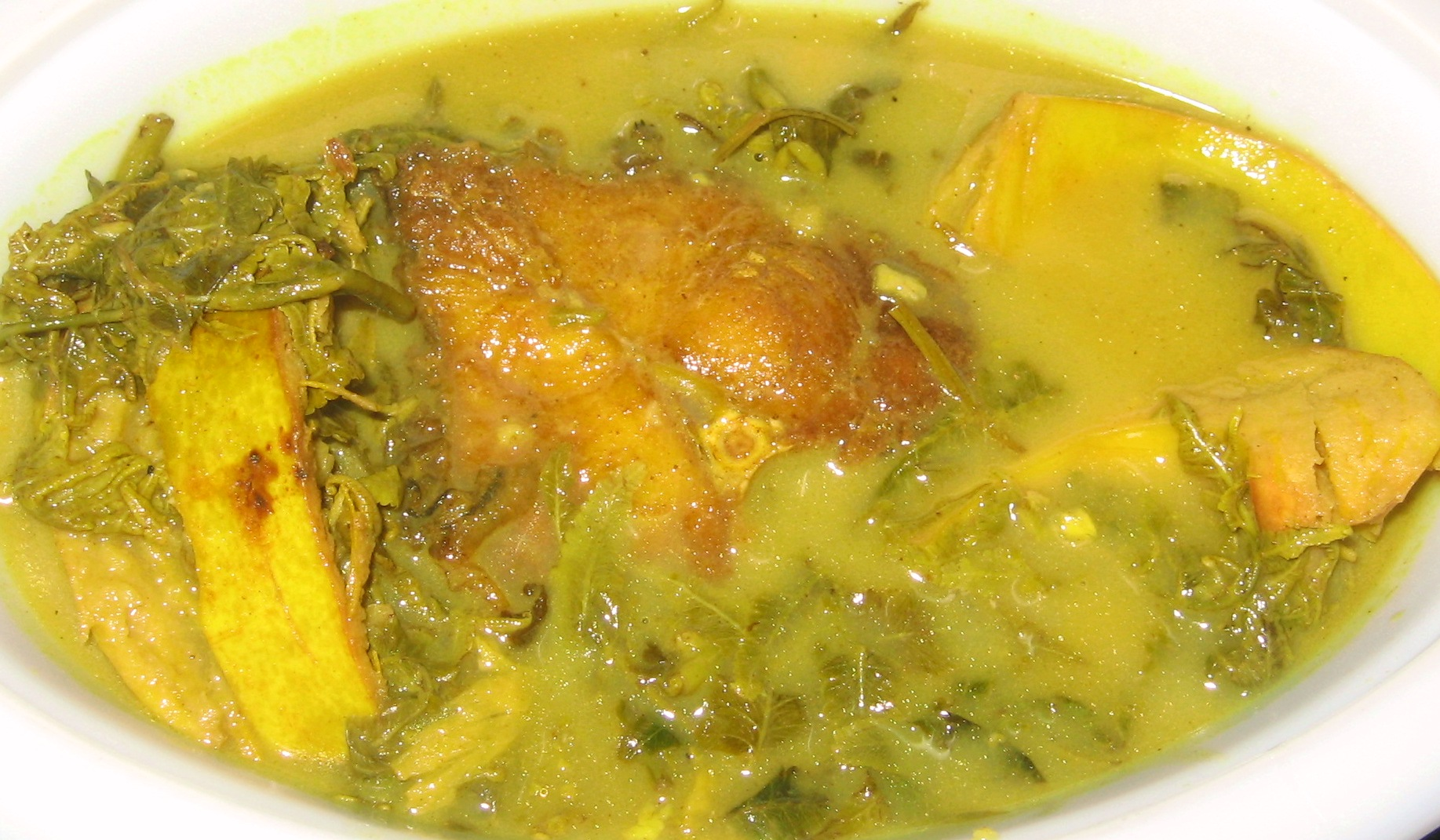
Dhekiyaxak and outenga

Masor tenga
is a light and sour fish dish, another signature class of preparations. There are numerous ways of preparing the sour fish curry among Assamese people. The souring ingredient could be mangosteen, lemon, tomatoes, roselle leaves, Outenga, Manimuni, Tengesi, etc. Another important ingredient is kokum. Fish dishes made with fermented bamboo shoot (khorisa) are generally sour, but they are not called tenga. Fish is fried in mustard oil or stewed with bottle gourd or spinach or boiled simply. Another tenga dish is prepared with matimah (urad bean) and outenga (elephant apple). Bottle gourd can be added to it. Tengamora (Roselle) or noltenga (Indian chestnut vine) and lentil is a distinct tenga curry.

Naroxingho masor jul
another authentic dish from Assam, fish is cooked in a light gravy of curry leaves (noro-xingho paat), a common aromatic herb used in southern and some northern parts of India. The fish preparations in Assam emphasize on retaining the natural flavours of the fish, and hence, few spices are used.

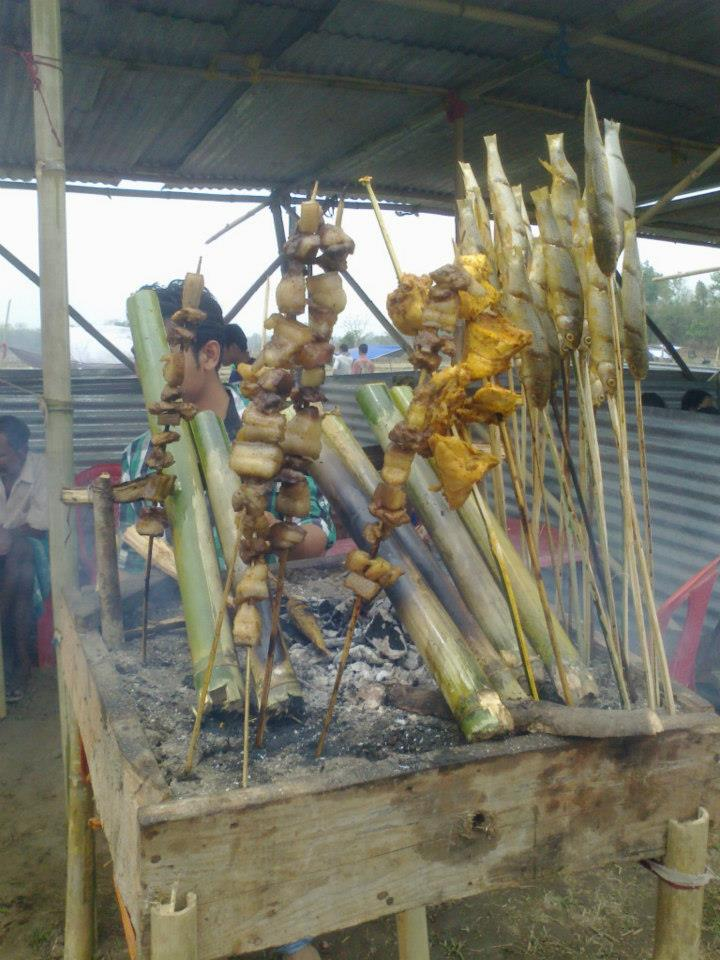
Pura maas mankho

Pura
various forms of grilled and roasted food. Vegetables, meat and fish are often served in this form. Aalu bengena pura pitika, pura maas pitika (mashed grilled fish), pura mankho etc. are a few of the popular dishes.

Poita bhat
a favourite dish in Assam during the summer season. Cooked rice is soaked overnight and left to ferment. It is and served with mustard oil, onion, chili, pickles, pitika (mashes), etc. The 'poitabhat' preparation is sometimes made alcoholic according to preference.

Pitika (পিটিকা, mashes)
a signature characteristic of this cuisine. The most popular is aloo pitika - আলু পিটিকা (mashed potatoes) garnished with raw onions, mustard oil, green chillies and sometimes boiled eggs. Khorisa tenga is mashed fermented bamboo shoot, sometimes pickled in mustard oil and spices. Kharoli is fermented mashed mustard (Brassica campestris var. toria) seed to which a khar has been added, and kahudi to which an acidic agent (lemon juice, dried mangosteen) has been added. Pitikas are also made from roasted or steamed vegetables (tomatoes and eggplants being very popular). Small fish, asiatic pennywort, matikaduri, tengamora leaves, heartleaf, dôrôn (Leucas longifolia), etc. are roasted separately wrapped in banana leaves and mashed into 'pitika'.

Pickles
made of mango, indian gooseberry, hog plum, Indian olive, Tamarind, star fruit, mangosteen, radish, carrot, elephant apple, Indian jujube, chili, lime, garlic, etc. Panitenga and kharoli are signature Assamese pickles made from ground mustard seeds.

Chutney
made of coriander, spinach, tomato, heartleaf, curry leaf, chilli, lentil, chickpea etc. Xukan masor (chutney made of dried fish) is popular among the tribal communities. Salads are made of carrot, radish, tomato, cucumber, beetroot, etc.

Bor
fried balls of mashed lentil or gram; equivalent to vada in few other Indian languages. It may contain other green leafy vegetable locally called 'xaak' within it, and it is best while served with 'teteli' (tamarind) curry or dip. There is a huge variety of 'bora' preparations in Assamese cuisine. The base ingredients include greens, vegetables, fruits, flowers, skin, and shoots of various plants. 'Bora' can also be prepared from fish eggs etc.

Fritter
made of flower and tender leaves of pumpkin, banana, tender leaves of bottle gourd, eggplant, tender leaves of night-flowering jasmine, etc. It is a new style of cooking somewhat having external influences.

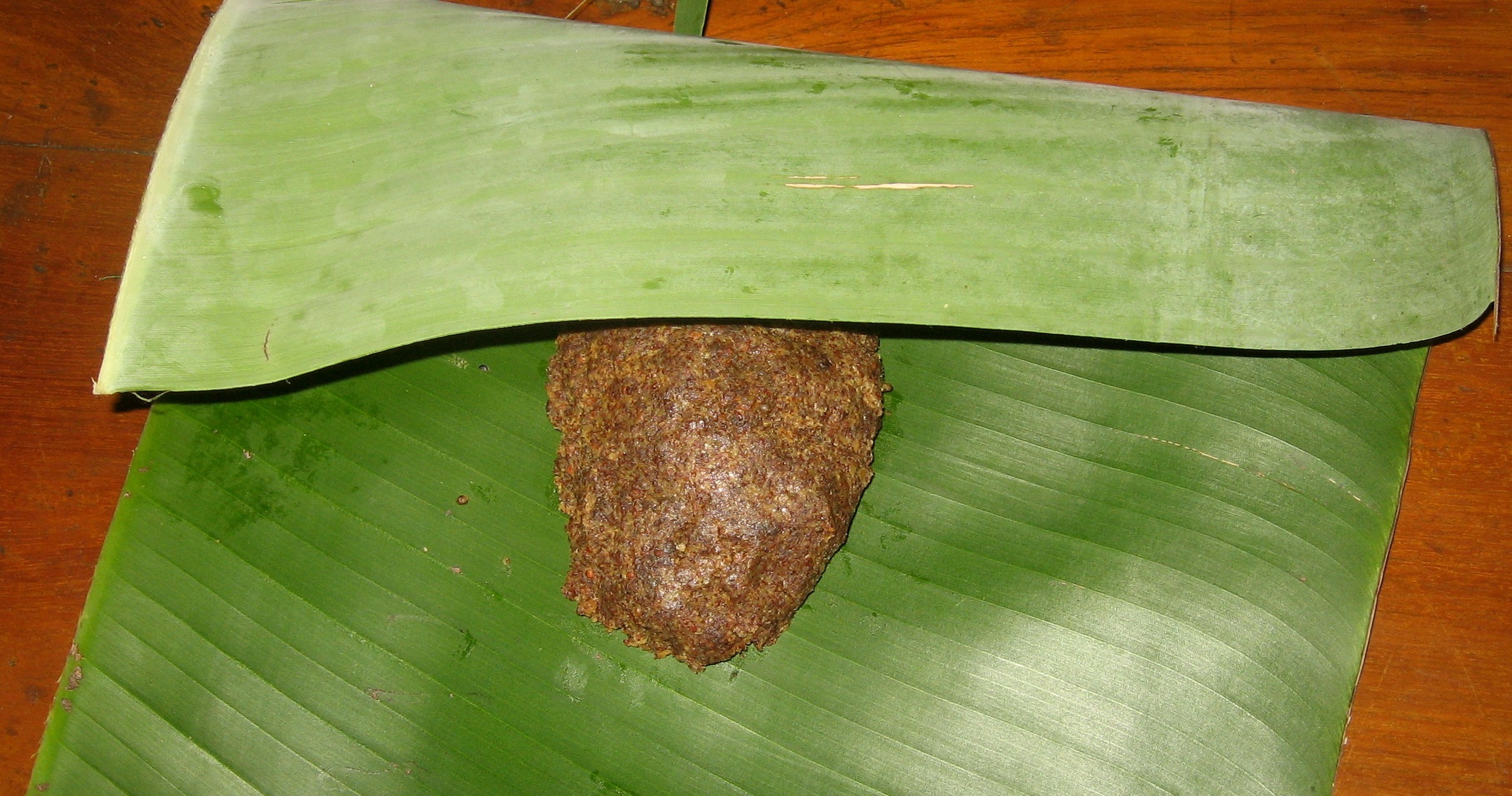
Panitenga

Other preparations in Assamese cuisine include kahudi, panitenga, khorikatdiya, tenga sorsoriya and posola.

== Alcoholic beverages ==
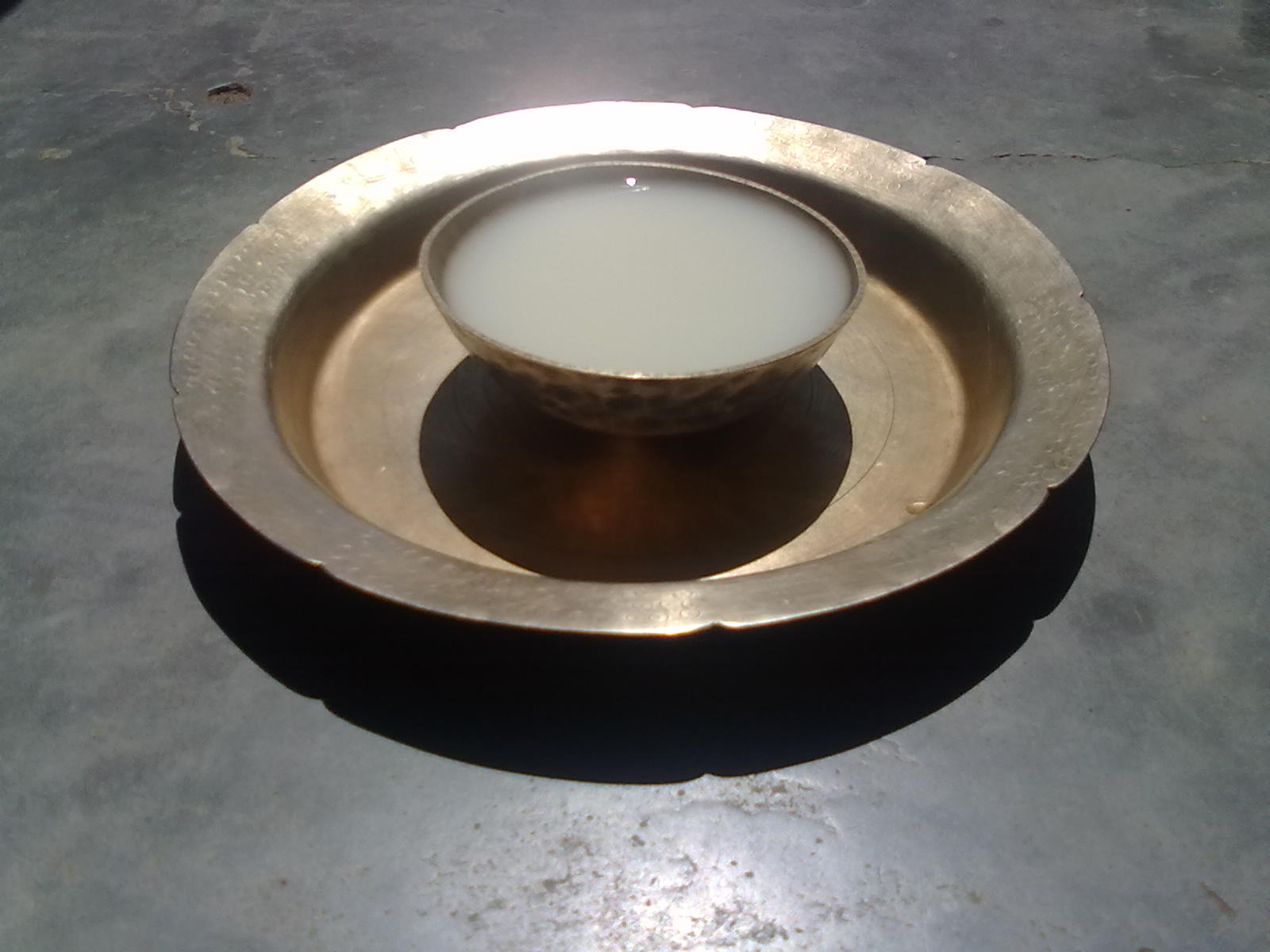
Xaj, a type of rice beer, offered in traditional utensils

Liquor is an integral part of linguistically and culturally diverse communities in Assamaese society. Rice is a primary ingredient for the many rice beers (Nam-lao - নাম-লাও) or (Laopani/Xaaj) and liquors made in Assam by different ethnic communities: zou (Bodo), aapong (Mishing), rohi (ৰহি) and mod (মদ) (Sonowal Kachari), chuje (Chutia), nam-lao -নাম-লাও (Tai-Ahom), haj (Tiwa), hor (Karbi), photika - ফটিকা (Kachari), etc.

== Snacks and cakes ==
=== Jolpan ===
Jolpan (snacks) in Assamese are often considered breakfast foods, although they are not always served as breakfast in Assamese cuisine. They are eaten as light meals between main meals and widely served during Bihu, weddings, Assamese shraadhs or any other kind of special occasions and gatherings. Some types of jolpan are Bora saul (varieties of sticky rice), Komal Saul, Xandoh, Chira, Muri, Akhoi, Sunga saul, etc., eaten in combination with hot milk, curd, jaggery, yogurt or seasonal ripe fruits. These are probably some of the earliest forms of "cereals". Assamese people have been eating them mainly as breakfast for many centuries.

=== Pitha ===
Pitha (rice cake) is a special class of rice preparation generally made only on occasions like Bhogali Bihu in Assam. Made usually with soaked and ground rice, they could be fried in oil, roasted over a slow fire or baked and rolled over a hot plate. Some pithas are Til Pitha, Ghila Pitha, Xutuli Pitha, Sunga Pitha, Bhapotdiya Pitha, Lakhimi Pitha, Tora Pitha, Tekeli Pitha, Deksi Pitha, Muthiya Pitha, Kholasapori Pitha, etc.

It is made in other areas of East and South-East Asia and has similarities with them rather than any Mainland Indian cuisine form etc.

=== Laru ===
Larus are sweet balls that are associated with traditional Assamese food: Laskara, narikolor laru, tilor laru are often seen in Assamese cuisine.

=== Tea ===
Tea (saah in Assamese) is an indispensable part of Assamese cuisine. Preparations and variations include: black tea served without milk (also known as laal saah or red tea), milk tea, lemon tea (black tea with lemon juice), herbal tea, spiced tea, and green tea.

== Tamul ==
An Assamese meal is generally concluded with the chewing of tamul (Assamese: তামোল). Pieces of betel nut (Areca catechu) are eaten in combination with betel leaf (Piper betle), edible limestone and tobacco.

== See also ==
- List of vegetables used in Assamese cuisine

== Furth reading ==
- Barbora, Sanjay (2006) Who needs butter chicken? The search for (and the finding of) a proud Assamese tradition of food, Himal Magazine, November 2006.
- Bhuyan, Biman; Baishya, Krishna (2013). "Ethno medicinal value of various plants used in the preparation of traditional rice beer by different tribes of Assam, India". Drug Invention Today. 5 (4): 335–341. doi:10.1016/j.dit.2013.09.002.
- Barman, Rini (16 January 2018). "The myth of 'Assamese Muslim' cuisine". The Hindu Business Line. Archived from the original on 26 November 2021.
- Das, A. J; Deka, S. C (2012). "Fermented foods and beverages of the North-East India" (PDF). International Food Research Journal. 19 (2). 377-392. Archived (PDF) from the original on 21 November 2023.
- Gogoi, Shrutashwinee (2011). Tai ahom religion a philosophical study (PhD). hdl:10603/116167. Archived from the original on 21 March 2024.
- Goswami, Prashanta (2004) Assam: Feast Northeast, Outlook Traveller, April 2004.
- Goswami, Uddipana (2000) Baptism by Beer: Assamese Cuisine, Tehelka Archived 27 September 2019 at the Wayback Machine.
- Guha, Amalendu (June 1984). "Pre-Ahom Roots and the Medieval State in Assam: A Reply". Social Scientist. 12 (6): 70. doi:10.2307/3517005. JSTOR 3517005.
- Saleh, Wahid (2007) A few links to Assamese Cuisine, Indiawijzer
- Tamang, Buddhiman; Tamang, Jyoti Prakash (2009). "Traditional knowledge of biopreservation of perishable vegetables and bamboo shoots in Northeast India as food resources" (PDF). Indian Journal of Traditional Knowledge. 8 (1): 89–95. Archived (PDF) from the original on 4 March 2016.
