= List of vegetables used in Assamese cuisine =

This is a list of culinary vegetables used in the cuisine of Assam. The fresh vegetables and herbs used in Assamese food contribute to its distinctive flavour. The tribes of Assam were known for using the bark, flowers, fruits, and stem, in addition to green leaves and herbs in their cooking. Assamese cuisine uses less oil, masala spice, and seasoning compared to other cuisines of India.

== Leafy vegetables and herbs ==
Assamese name	English name	Scientific name	Image
Paleng	Spinach	Spinacia oleracea	
Nol-Tenga	Indian chestnut vine	Tetrastigma leucostaphylum	
Modhu-Xuleng		Persicaria microcephala	
Bor-Maanimuni	Asiatic pennywort	Centella asiatica	
Xoru-Maanimuni	Lawn Marshpennywort	Hydrocotyle sibthorpioides	Soru Manimuni
Podina	Mint	Mentha arvensis	
Kolmou	Water spinach	Ipomoea aquatica	
Brahmi	Brahmi	Bacopa monnieri	
Dhonia, Doondia	Coriander	Coriandrum sativum	
Maan-Dhonia	Thai coriander	Eryngium foetidum	
Xukloti	Patchouli	Pogostemon cablin	
Xukloti	Bengal Patchouli	Pogostemon benghalensis	
Xukloti	Indian Patchouli	Pogostemon heyneanus	
Mosundori	Fish Mint	Houttuynia cordata	
Noro-Xingho	Curry leaf	Murraya koenigii	
Bhedai-Lota	Stinkvine	Paederia foetida	
Pokmou	Tomatillo	Physalis philadelphica	
Xorioh Xaak	Mustard plant	Brassica juncea	
Lai Xaak	Vegetable Mustard	Brassica juncea	
Purno-Nobha Xaak	Dichondra	Dichondra	
Morisa Xaak/Datha	Amaranth	Amaranthus caudatus	
Khutura Xaak	Green amaranth	Amaranthus viridis	
Puroi Xaak	Red vine spinach	Basella rubra	
Mula Xaak	Radish	Raphanus sativus	
Suka Xaak	Spinach dock	Rumex acetosa	
Babori (Calendula)	Crown Daisy		
Lofa Xaak	Chinese Mellow	Malva verticillata	
Zilmil Xaak	White Goosefoot	Chenopodium album	
Tenga-Mora	Roselle	Hibiscus sabdariffa	
Tita-Mora / Mora-paat	Jute plant	Corchorus olitorius	
Doroon	Long-Leaf Laucas	Leucas plukenetii (Roth.) Spr.	
Purno-Nobha	Tar vine	Boerhavia diffusa	
Dhekia Xaak	Fiddle head fern	Diplazium esculentum	
Motor Xaak	Pea greens		
Mosur Xaak	Lentil greens	Lens culinaris	
Ronga Laur Xaak	Pumpkin greens	Cucurbita pepo	
Kola Kosu	Elephant Ear	colocasia	
Mohanim	Margosa leaves	Azadirachta indica	
Xeuali Ful	Night-flowering Jasmine	Nyctanthes arbor-tristis	
Mati-Kaduri	Sessile joyweed	Alternanthera sessilis	
Hati Khutura/ Kata Khutura	Spiny amaranth	Amaranthus spinosus	
Kukura Jara		Celosia argentea	
		Hydrocotyle javanica	
Meteka Xaak	Arrowhead	Sagittaria sagittifolia	
Malbhog Khutura	Purslane	Portulaca oleracea	
Kona-Ximolu	Tropical spiderwort	Commelina benghalensis	
Xoru-Pokmou	Hound's Berry	Solanum nigrum	
	Arrowleaf Sida	Sida rhombifolia	
Bhringraj	False Daisy	Eclipta alba	
Ul Kosu	Stink lily	Amorphophallus paeoniifolius	
Methi Xaak	Fenugreek greens	Trigonella foenum-graecum	
Piaz Xaak	Spring Onion	Tree onion	
Nohoru Xaak	Garlic greens	Allium sativum	
Tynriew	Viagra palm	Calamus erectus	

== Non-leafy vegetables ==
Assamese name	English name	Scientific name	Image
Bondha-Kobi, Bondhakobi	Cabbage	Brassica oleracea Capitata Group	
Ful-Kobi, Phulkobi	Cauliflower	Brassica oleracea Botrytis Group	
Ul-Kobi, Oolkobi	Knolkhol or Kohlrabi	Brassica oleracea Gongylodes Group	
Alu	Potato	Solanum tuberosum	
Kath-Alu, Thaa in Bodo	Yam	Dioscorea alata	
Mitha-Alu, Ronga aloo	Sweet potato	Ipomoea batatas	
Bit, Beet	Beet	Beta vulgaris	
Kosu, Thaso	Taro	Colocasia esculenta	
Koldil, Kolful	Banana flower		
Kaskol, Purakol	Curry banana	Musa splendida	
Posola	Banana Stem		
Kothalor Musi, Musi Kothal	Jackfruit (Young), Unripe Jackfruit	Artocarpus heterophyllus	
Potol	Pointed gourd	Trichosanthes dioica	
Bhul	Sponge gourd or Luffa	Luffa aegyptiaca	
Zika, Jika	Ridge gourd or Ridged Luffa	Luffa acutangula	
Dhunduli	Snake gourd	Trichosanthes cucumerina	
Toroi			
Zati-Lau, Jati Lao	Bottle gourd	Lagenaria siceraria	
Kumura	White gourd or White Melon	Benincasa hispida	
Ronga-Lau, Ronga Lao Jwgwnar	Pumpkin	Cucurbita moschata	
Teeta-Kerela	Bitter gourd	Momordica charantia	
Bhaat-Kerela	Teasle Gourd	Momordica dioica	Bhat Kerela
Kunduli	Ivy gourd	Coccinia grandis	
Siral / Bangi / Bami	Mouse melon / Santa claus melon	Melothria scabra	
Bhendi	Okra, Lady's fingers	Abelmoschus esculentus	
Tioh / Tihu/ Thaibeng	Cucumber	Cucumis sativus	
Mula	Radish	Raphanus sativus	
Gaazor, Gajor	Carrot	Daucus carota	
Bilahi	Tomato	Solanum lycopersicum	
Kon-Bilahi	Cherry tomato	Solanum pimpinellifolium	
Salgum	Turnip	Brassica rapa rapa	
Bengena	Eggplant	Solanum melongena	
Bhekuri	Indian nightshade	Solanum anguivi	
Omita, Mudumful	Papaya	Carica papaya	
Iskos (borrowed from English: Squash)	Chayote	Sechium edule	
Sozina	Drumstick	Moringa oleifera	
Ou-Tenga, Thaigir	Elephant apple	Dillenia indica	
Thekera-Tenga	Thekera tenga	Garcinia pedunculata	
Bet-Gaaz	Rattan shoot		
Bah-Gaaz	Bamboo shoot		
Kath-Ful, Kathphula	Mushroom	Agaricus bisporus	
Jolokia	Chili pepper	Capsicum frutescens	
Bhut Jolokia	Bhut jolokia	Capsicum chinense 'Naga Jolokia'	
কেপছিকাম, Kepsikam	Bell pepper	Capsicum annuum	
Piyaaj	Onion	Allium cepa	

== Beans and pulses ==
Assamese name	English name	Scientific name	Image			
Mosur-Maah	Lentil	Lens culinaris				
Motor-Maah	Pea	Pisum sativum				
Dhua Mogu	White lentil	Vigna mungo				
Mati-Maah	Urad bean	Vigna mungo				
Mogu-Maah	Mung bean	Vigna radiata				
Rohor dail/dali	Pigeon pea	Cajanus cajan				
Boot-Maah	Chickpea	Cicer arietinum				
Motor Dail/Dali	Split pea	Pisum sativum				
French bean	Green bean					
	Runner bean	Phaseolus coccineus				
Dangbodi/Lesera/Leseri	Yardlong bean	Vigna unguiculata sesquipedalis				
Raz-Maah	Common bean	Phaseolus vulgaris				
Lesera-Maah	Black-eyed pea	Vigna unguiculata unguiculata				
Urohi	Indian Bean	Lablab purpureus		long guti	clove Bean	Ipomoea Muricata

== Spices ==
Assamese name	English name	Scientific name	Image
Aada	Ginger	Zingiber officinale	
Nohoru	Garlic	Allium sativum	
Piyaaj	Onion	Allium cepa	
Jeera	Cumin	Cuminum cyminum	
Kaal Jeera, Kola Jeera	Black cumin	Nigella sativa	
Jaluk	Black pepper	Piper nigrum	
Jolokiya	Chili pepper		
Halodhi	Turmeric	Curcuma longa	
Dhoniya	Coriander seed	Coriandrum sativum	
Dalsini, Dalseni	Cinnamon	Cinnamomum verum	
Elaisi, Elaichi	Cardamom	Elettaria cardamomum	
Lwong	Clove	Syzygium aromaticum	
Methiguti	Fenugreek seed	Trigonella foenum-graecum	
Boga Xoriyoh	White mustard seed	Sinapis alba	
Sofguti	Fennel	Foeniculum vulgare	
Tezpat	Bay leaf	Cinnamomum tamala	

== See also ==
- Assamese cuisine
