= Bacoside A =

Chemical structure of bacoside A3, a major constituent of bacoside A

Bacoside A is a mixture of chemical compounds, known as bacosides, isolated from Bacopa monnieri. Its major constituents include the saponins bacoside A3, bacopaside II, bacopasaponin C, and jujubogenin isomer of bacopasaponin C. The mixture has been studied in in vitro experiments and animal models for its potential neuroprotectivity.
