= Kaji Nemu =

State fruit of Assam

- Geographical indication
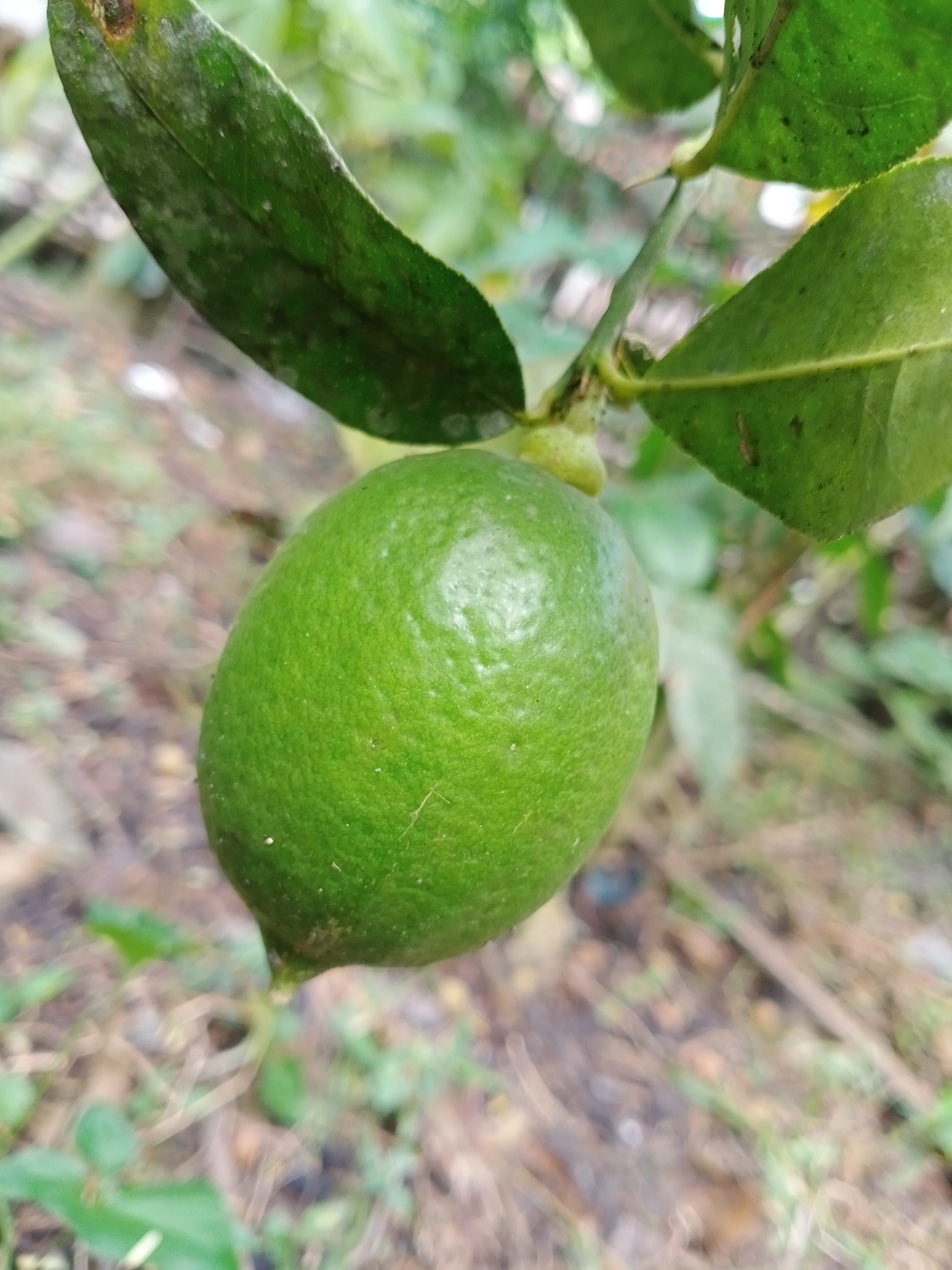
- Kaji Nemu
- Alternative names: Kazi Nemu, Kajinemu
- Type: Agricultural
- Area: Assam
- Country: India
- Registered: 10 May 2019
- Material: Lemon

Kaji Nemu is a special variety of Assam lemon grown in various parts of Assam. Kaji Nemu is the state fruit of Assam. Kaji Nemu has some characteristics that set it apart from other lemons, particularly its distinct smell and relatively larger size. Kaji Nemu fruits do not fall off the tree for many days after ripening, and they usually bear fruit throughout the year. On 10 May 2019, Kaji Nemu received geographical indication tag.

== Description ==
Kaji Nemu is a perennial thorny shrub. Its leaves are dark green in color and emit a fragrance when picked. The trees typically grow to a height of 2–3.5 m, with leaves measuring 7–10 cm in length and 3–5 cm in width. Kaji Nemu trees have a lifespan of about 20 to 25 years. They produce light purple flowers and yield 300 to 500 fruits when mature. Each fruit weighs about 60–100 grams, and the trees can yield 20 to 30 tonnes per hectare per year. The lemon's bark is thin, and ripe lemons are rich in juice. The fruit ranges in color from dark green to light green-yellow and is suitable for picking. Kaji Nemu are produced throughout the year, although production is lower from November to January.

Major producing districts include Dibrugarh, Golaghat, Cachar, Chirang, Nalbari and Dima Hasao.

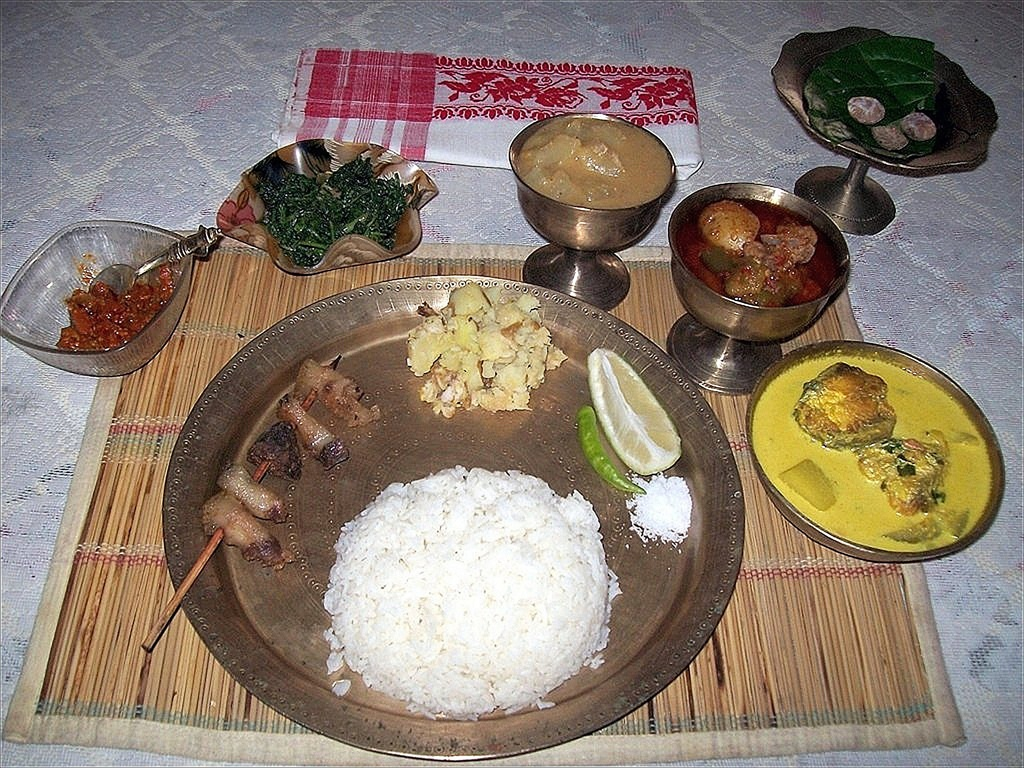
Kaji Nemu in Assamese Thali. It is in the upper right position to the rice, near salt and green chilli

== Agriculture ==
Kaji Nemu thrives best in loamy soils with good drainage, avoiding water retention. A dry subtropical climate is ideal for lemon cultivation. Kaji Nemu is primarily propagated through cuttings, although seedlings can also be grown from seeds. To achieve higher yields, appropriate fertilizers and water management practices should be applied, while pesticides are recommended to protect against pests and diseases.

== Speciality ==
Kaji Nemu exhibits several distinctive characteristics, including its larger size compared to other lemons, often resulting in seedless fruit or very few seeds. Other notable features include:

- Kaji Nemu bears fruit consistently throughout the year, with peak fruiting periods occurring twice annually, leading to high yields.
- It emits a unique fragrance distinct from other lemon varieties.
- The fruits remain attached to the tree even after ripening.
- Fruits grow in clusters on new branches, contributing to the abundance of the harvest.

== Uses ==
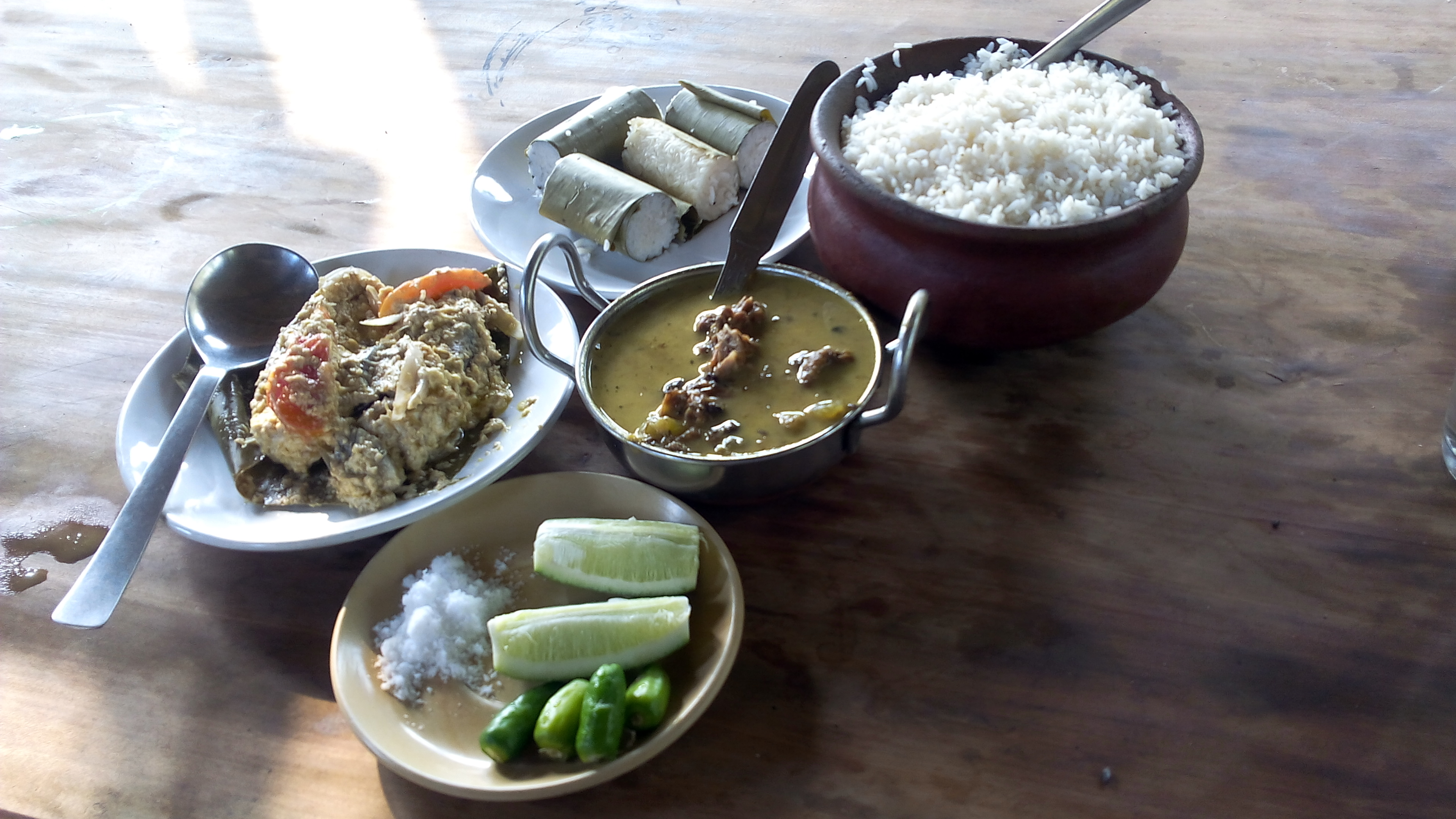
Kaji Nemu with Chunga Saul, fish steamed with mustard paste and Assamese style Duck curry

Kaji Nemu holds a special significance in Assamese cuisine, where raw lemon slices are commonly served with rice and curries, allowing diners to season their meal as desired by squeezing the lemon slices. Moreover, lemons play a ceremonial role in weddings and are utilized in preparing tangy and sour dishes. Beyond culinary applications, Kaji Nemu possesses medicinal properties, making it a common ingredient in home remedies. Additionally, the fruit is utilized to extract essential oils for various purposes, further showcasing its versatility and importance in Assamese culture. It used for preparing refreshing drinks and pickles as well as garnishing curry and other dishes.

== Geographical indication ==
On January 5, 2018, the CRS Na-Dihing Nemu Tenga Development Committee, in collaboration with Assam Agricultural University, submitted an application for geographical recognition of Kaji Nemu. On May 10, 2019, it was granted a Geographical indication tag, acknowledging its unique geographical origin and characteristics. In February 2024, Government of Assam named it as state fruit, highlighting the unique aroma and antioxidant properties of the indigenous lemon variety.
