= Jolpan =

Indian snack

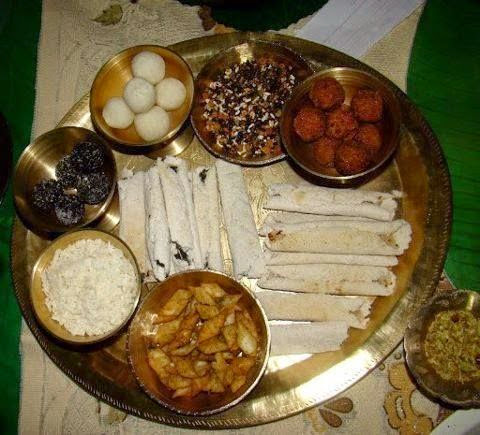
Traditional Assamese Jolpan Thali

Jolpan is a snack often served at breakfast in the cuisine of Assam, although they may also be served at Bihu festivals or weddings. Jolpan includes various preparations such as pitha, chira, muri along with curd, and others. Other common items served for breakfast may include roti, luchi, ghugni and sometimes paratha. Jolpan are also found in Bengal. The word literally derives from "water and betel leaf" but can mean any snack.

== Types of jolpan ==
Variations on jolpan include bora saul, komal saul, xandoh, chira, muri, and akhoi, along with curd, jaggery, yogurt and various pitha.

=== Bora saul ===
Bora saul (Assamese: বৰা চাউল) is boiled and served as jolpan with curd or milk, jaggery or sugar. Mostly used in Northern Assam.

=== Komal saul ===
Kumol saul (Assamese: কোমল চাউল) is a unique type of rice from Assam that can be eaten without cooking. It is rendered fluffy and edible by being soaked in water for a short time. The rice may be eaten with milk or curd, jaggery, yogurt after being immersed in warm water for just fifteen minutes or so.

=== Chira ===
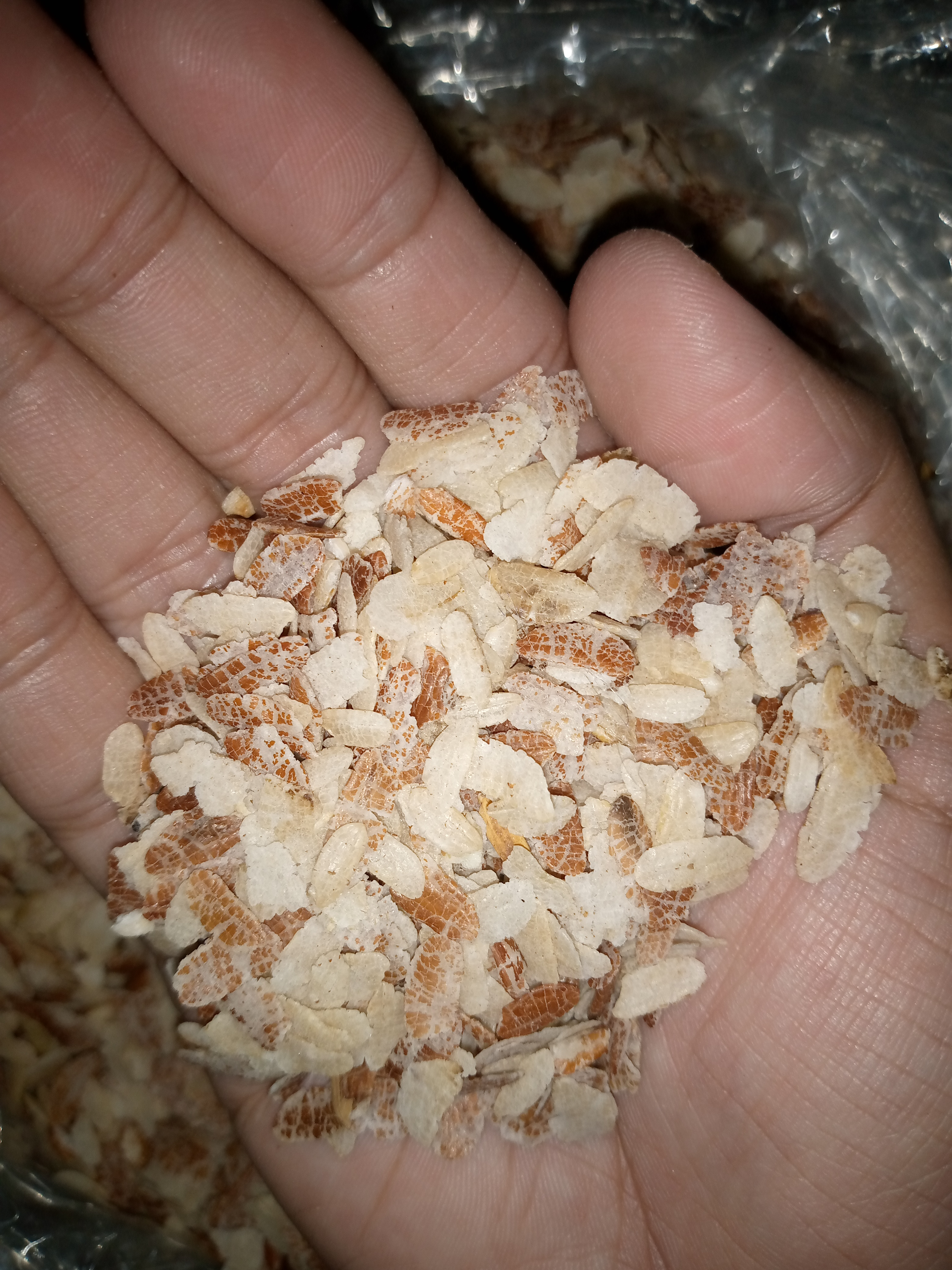
Chira

Chira (flattened rice, also called beaten rice, Assamese: চিৰা) is a dehusked rice which is flattened into flat light dry flakes. These flakes of rice swell when added to liquid, whether hot or cold, as they absorb water, milk or any other liquids. It can be eaten raw by immersing it in plain water or milk or curd, with salt or sugar or jaggery to taste, or lightly fried in oil.

=== Muri ===
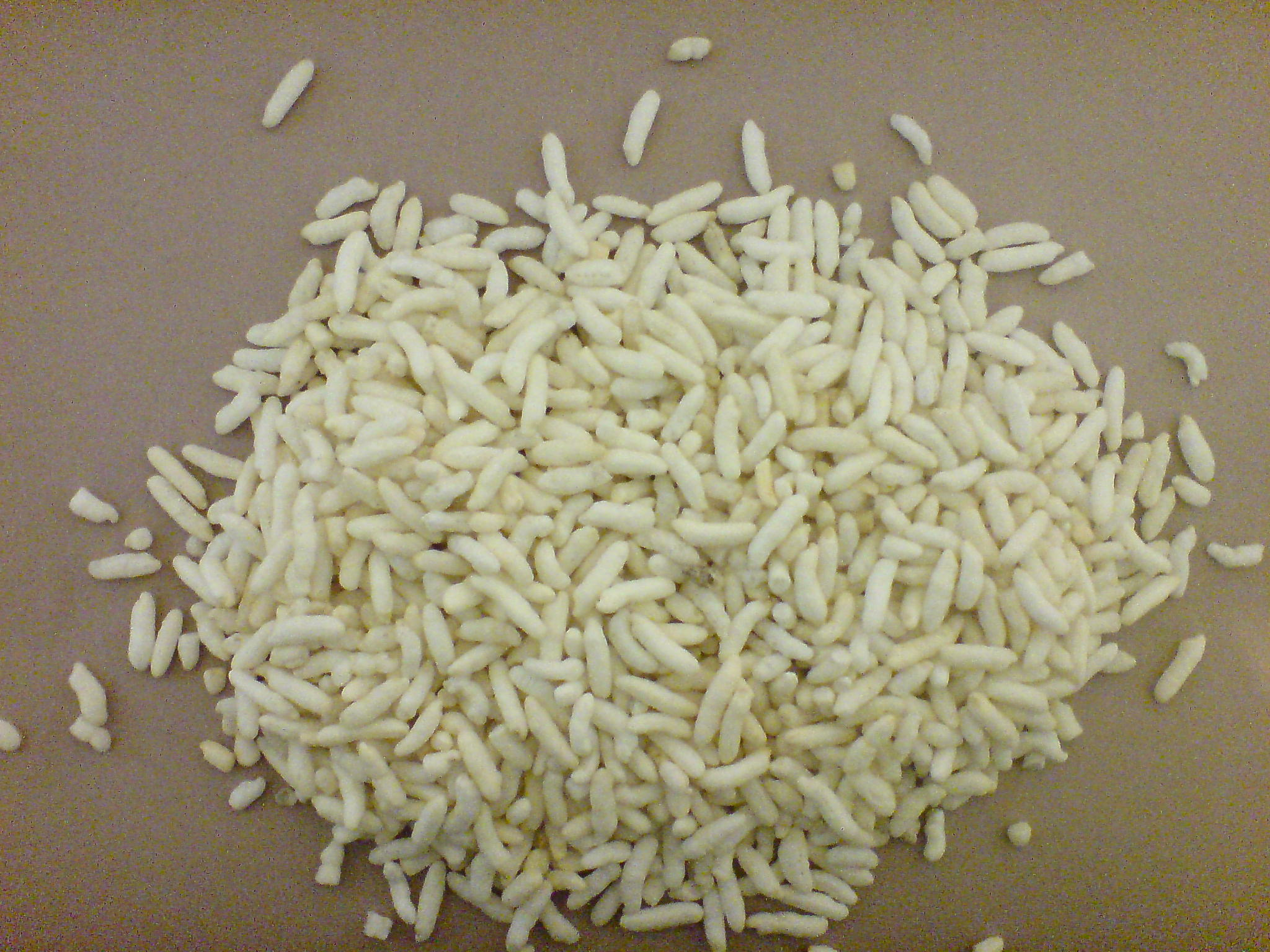
Muri

Muri (puffed rice) is made by heating sand in a pot, and then throwing in grains of rice. The rice may be washed in brine to provide seasoning. The rice puffs up and is separated from the sand by a strainer. It is served with hot milk or curd and jaggery or sugar. The puffed rice made from bora saul is popularly known as hurum.

=== Xandoh guri ===
(Assamese: সান্দহ গুৰি) It is prepared from kola bora, ghiu bora, pakhi bora or ronga bora (varieties of bora saul). The rice is soaked for three to four days and then fried. The fried rice is pounded in a dheki, a homemade wooden mill in Assam to pound grains, and sifted to dehusk. The pounded and dehusked rice is again fried in hot sand and thus hurum is prepared. It is served with curd, hot milk, yogurt, sugar or jaggery.

=== Sunga saul ===
Dehusked aroi bora saul is soaked for 2/3 hours. Then it is put in an immature bamboo tube and a little water or sometimes coconut milk is added to it. Banana leaf is used as cork. The tube is roasted in fire and sunga saul is prepared. Removing the tube the substance is served with curd, hot milk, yogurt, sugar etc.

=== Pithaguri ===
Rice flour (pithaguri in Assamese) is fried and served with hot milk, jaggery and sometimes with ripe banana or ripe jackfruit. It is a common type of jolpan.

=== Suji ===
Suji (semolina) is also one type of common jolpan, a type of dessert. Like pithaguri it is heated on a frying pan and water is added to make it a paste and then served with hot milk.

=== Koni-dhan ===
The basic preparation consists of washing the millet (konidhan in Assamese; Koni = tiny; dhan = rice) and toasting it while moving it until one notes a characteristic scent. Then five measures of boiling water for each two measures of millet are added with some sugar or salt. The mixture is cooked covered using low flame for 30–35 minutes.

=== Kath aloo ===
Yam (kath aloo in Assamese) is peeled, sliced, added salt and tamarind powder and then deep-fried in mustard oil.

== Pitha ==
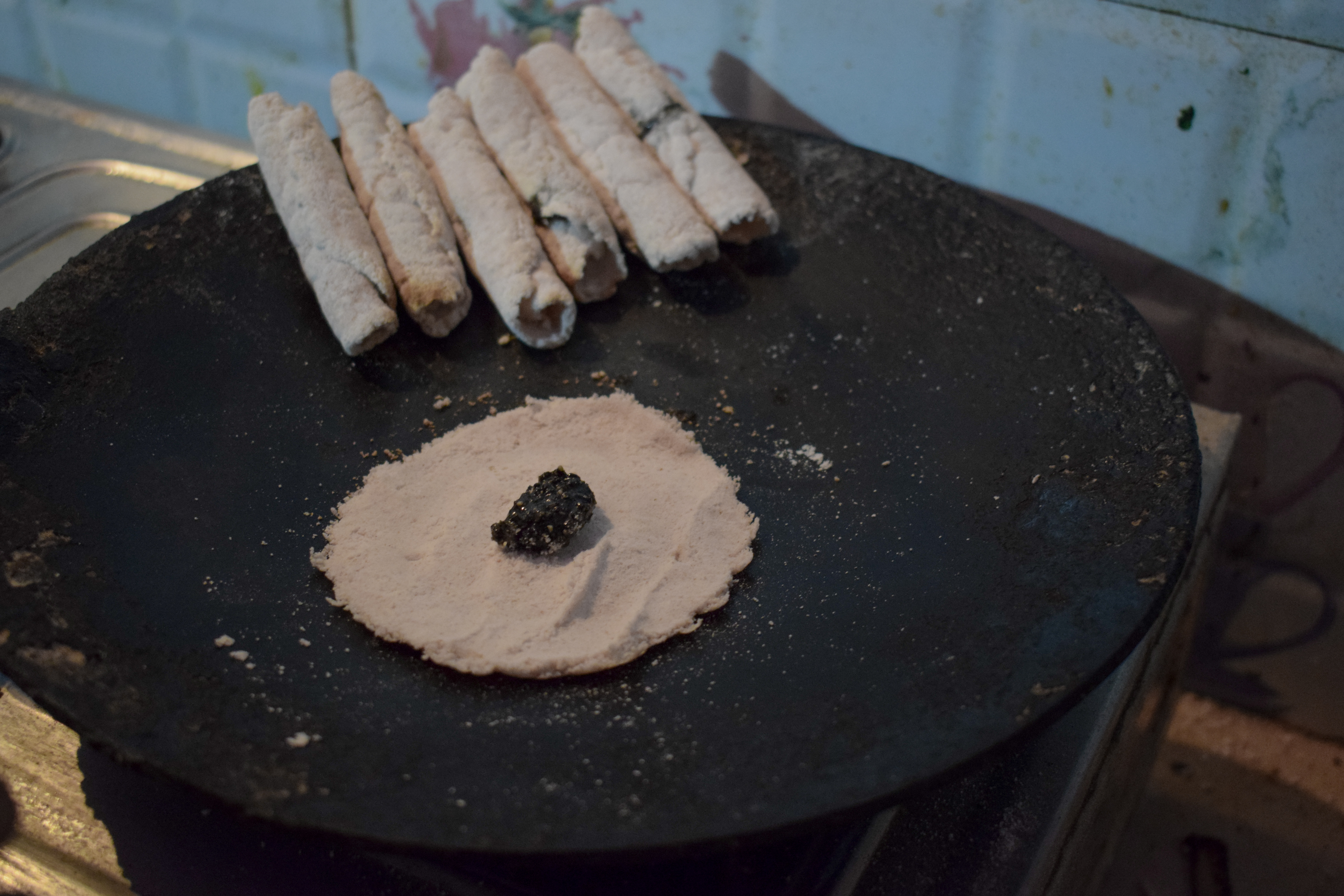
Making of til pitha

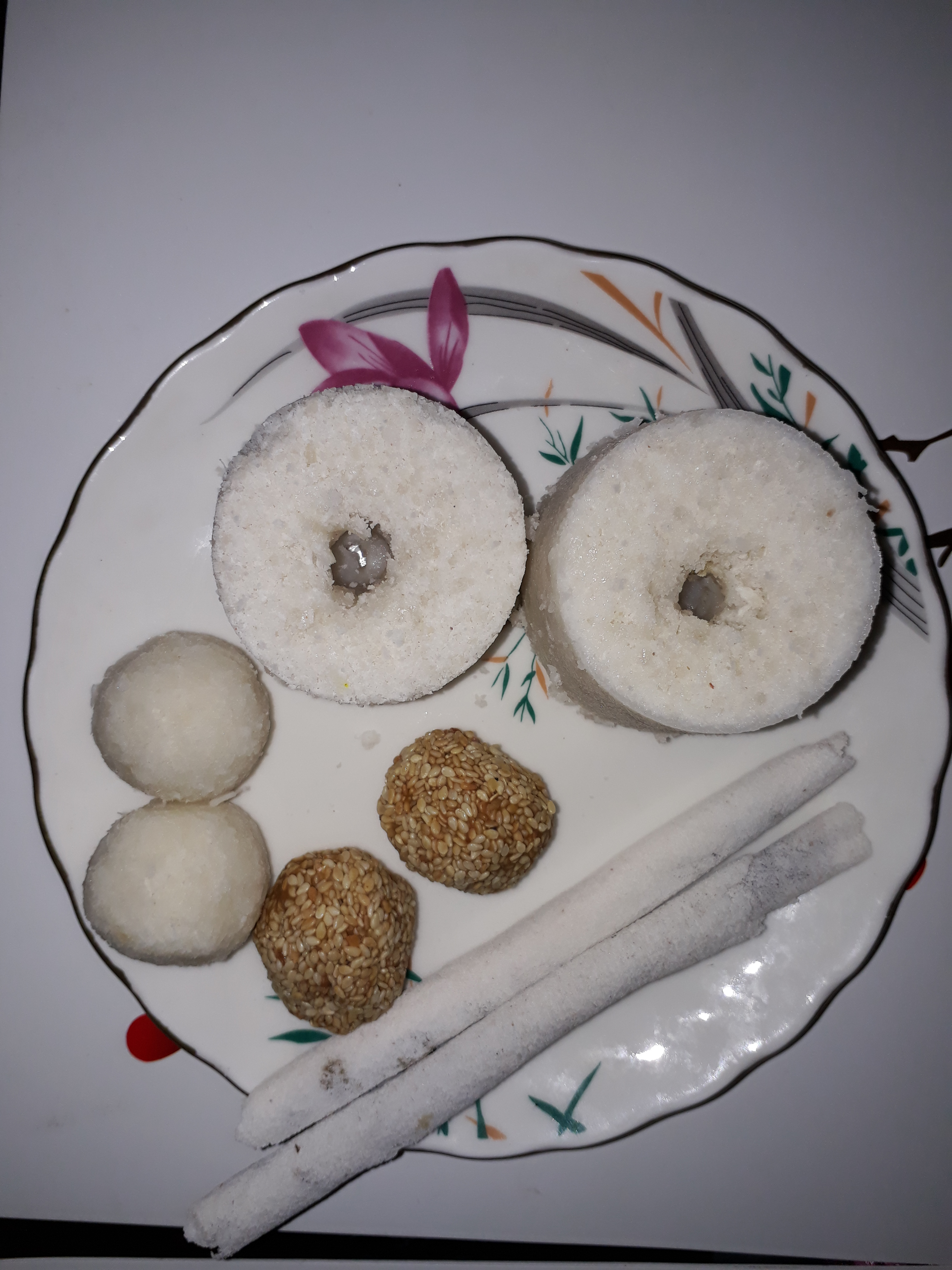
Sunga pitha, narikol or laru, Tilor laru and Tilor pitha in a plate

Pitha (Assamese: পিঠা) is a rice cake or pancake, a thin flat cake prepared from a batter and cooked on a hot griddle or frying pan. It is an inseparable part of jolpan in Assam. It is a special class of rice preparation generally made only on special occasions like Bihu in Assam. Made usually with soaked and ground rice, they may be fried in oil, roasted over a slow fire or baked and rolled over a hot plate. Some pithas are Til Pitha, Narikol Pitha, Ghila Pitha, Xutuli Pitha, Sunga Pitha, Bhapotdiya Pitha, Lakhimi Pitha, Tora Pitha, Tekeli Pitha, Muthiya Pitha and Kholasapori Pitha.

=== Kachi pitha ===
Kachi Pitha is a type of pancake. It is a special class of rice preparation and generally made only on special occasions like Bihu in Assam. Bora saul, a glutinous type of rice is soaked and ground. Then a certain quantity of this rice flour is baked, filled up with sesame seeds, ground coconut and dried rind of orange, jaggery etc. and pressed and rolled with many folders.

=== Ghila pitha ===
Ghila pitha is a type of pancake so called because of its knee cap-like shape. (The knee cap is called ghila in Assamese.) Rice flour of Bora saul, one kind of glutinous rice or any common rice is used in it. A paste made of rice flour and jaggery is prepared first and then fried in cooking oil at a certain quantity. Salt is also used instead of jaggery to make salty Ghila pitha. It is generally prepared and served in Bihu in Assam.

=== Sunga pitha ===
The procedure of preparing Sunga Pitha is almost the same as for Sunga Saul except for the fact that the preparation of sunga pitha involves grounded rice or rice flour instead of whole rice as in Sunga saul . Rice flour of Xaali saul and Bora saul is mixed with water and jaggery and churned thoroughly. Then the paste is put in an immature bamboo tube corked with banana leaf and roasted over a fire. The bamboo tube is removed to leave a solid cylinder of pitha. This is cut into pieces and served with hot milk.

=== Uhuwa pitha ===
Rice flour of xaali saul and bora saul is mixed with jaggery or salt and water and churned thoroughly. The paste is rolled into small balls and flattened and then boiled in water. It is served with tea and also can be eaten with milk.

=== Tekeli pitha ===
Rice flour of Xaali saul (sunned rice) and Bora saul is mixed with coconut, sugar and a little powdered milk. Ground cardamom and dried orange rind can also be added. An earthenware, half filled up with water is set on a hearth. A neat cloth is placed on the beam of the pitcher and the flour mixture is put in it. Now the beam is covered with a cork and fire is set in the hearth. The substance is baked with the heat of vapor that comes from inside the pitcher and subsequently takes shape. Now it is cut into pieces like a cake and served with tea. This pitha is so called because a tekeli (earthenware) is used in it.

=== Ketli pitha ===
The method of preparation as well as the substance is as same as tekeli pitha, but a kettle is used here instead of earthenware. This is why it is called ketli pitha (ketli in Assamese means kettle). Here the kettle-cork is kept upside-down on the kettle and the substance is put on it. It usually takes less time to be baked than tekeli pitha takes.

== Laru ==
Different types of larus are prepared in the season of Bihu in Assam.

=== Narikolor Laru ===
Mature coconut is scrapped (or ground) and fried. Then sugar is added and mixed well. Then it is toasted over slow fire till the ingredients caramelize and hold on to each other. Its readiness is tested by trying to make a small ball first; if it does, then the caramelized coconut pot is taken out to cool off a little. With the help of cold water rubbed on palms, and before it cools down to room temperature, it is now rolled into small balls and kept separately to dry. These small balls of coconut are called Narikol Laru. It is served with tea.

=== Tilor laru ===
Tilor laru is a kind of sesame candy. Sesame seeds are fried and kept aside. Jaggery is heated to liquefy and then poured into the heap of fried sesame seeds. They get sticky and the substance is rolled into small balls and kept separately to dry. These balls are served with tea.

== Tea ==
A cup of tea is nearly always served with jolpan or pitha, in the form of black tea, milk tea, spiced tea, lemon tea (adding lemon juice to black tea), or other preparations.

== See also ==
- Cuisine of Assam
- List of vegetables used in Assamese cuisine
