= Indian pennywort =

Indian pennywort is a common name for several plants and may refer to:

- Bacopa monnieri
- Centella asiatica
- Oenanthe javanica
