= Bacoside =

Chemical structure of bacoside A3

Bacosides are a class of chemical compounds isolated from Bacopa monnieri. Chemically, they are dammarane-type triterpenoid saponins.

There are at least twelve known members of the class.

== See also ==
- Bacoside A
