= Chokuwa saul rice =

Variety of rice found in Assam, India

Joha rice
- Geographical indication
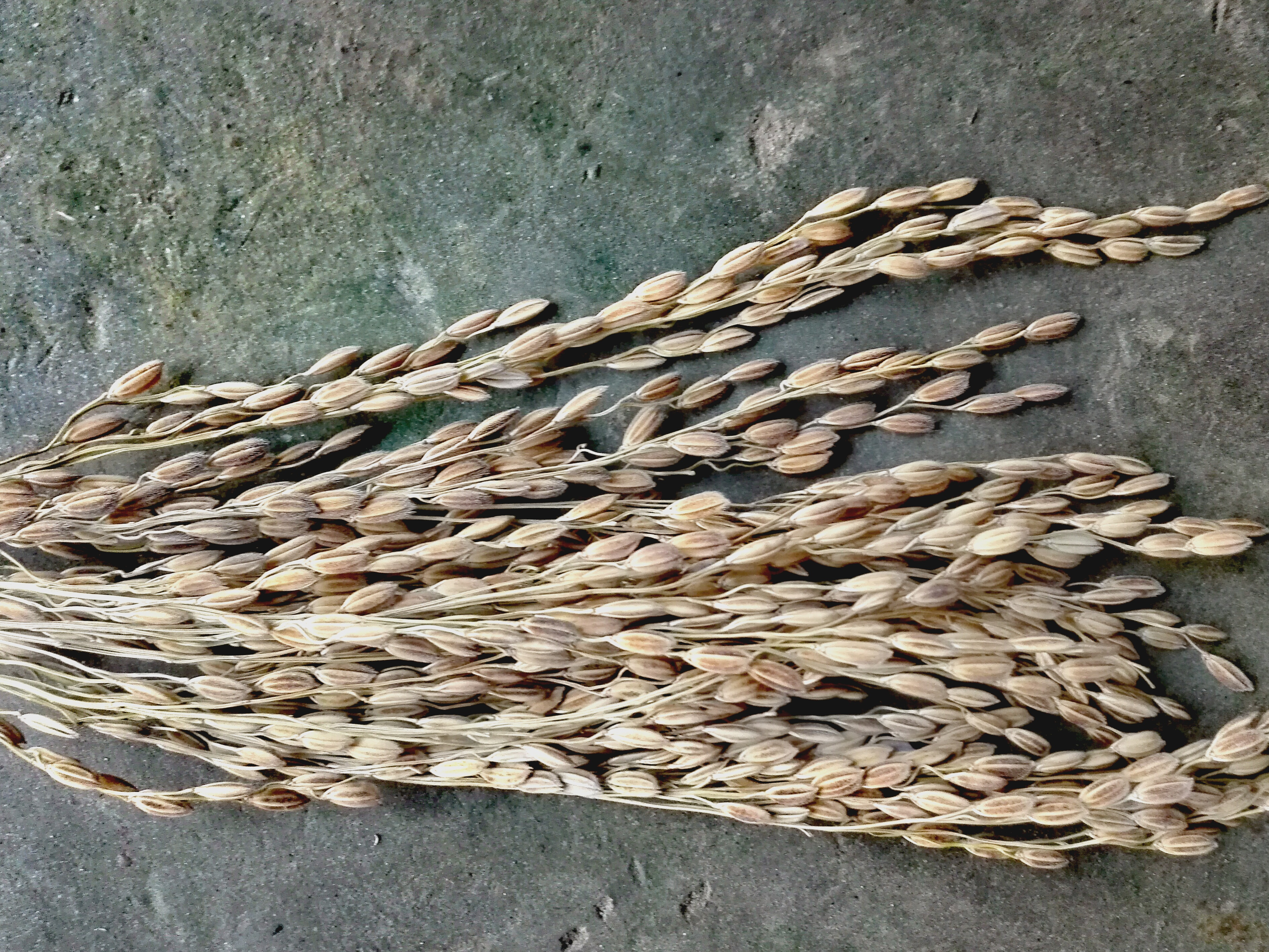
- Chokuwa Rice
- Description: Chokuwa rice is a rice variety cultivated in Assam
- Area: Assam
- Country: India

Chokuwa saul is a variety of semi-glutinous rice found in Assam, India. The sticky rice of Assam is traditionally classified as bora (glutinous) and Chokuwa (semi-glutinous) based on stickiness after cooking. It has an important role in Assam.

Chokuwa rises is traditionally prepared by soaking or boiling and is well known for requiring no active cooking process before consumption.

== Geographical Indication ==
In 2016, an organization called Seuj Satirtha in Sivasagar district in collaboration with the Assam Agricultural University applied for geographical recognition of chokuwa rice. The 124th edition of the journal published by the Geographical Identification Registration Department of the Government of India on 24 October 2019 granted a geographical indication (GI) tag to chokuwa rice.
