= Posola =

Assamese dish made from banana shoots

Posola in Assamese cuisine is a food made with the inner part of banana shoots. The bark is peeled off and the tender inner part of the banana stem cut into small pieces. Onions, garlic, cumin seeds, mustard seeds, and fenugreek seeds are fried in oil until they splutter and then the banana stem pieces are added into the mixture and simmered in a kadhai with some hot water. Once the water evaporates the dish is ready.
