= Bora saul =

Type of sticky rice

Bora Chaul
- Geographical indication
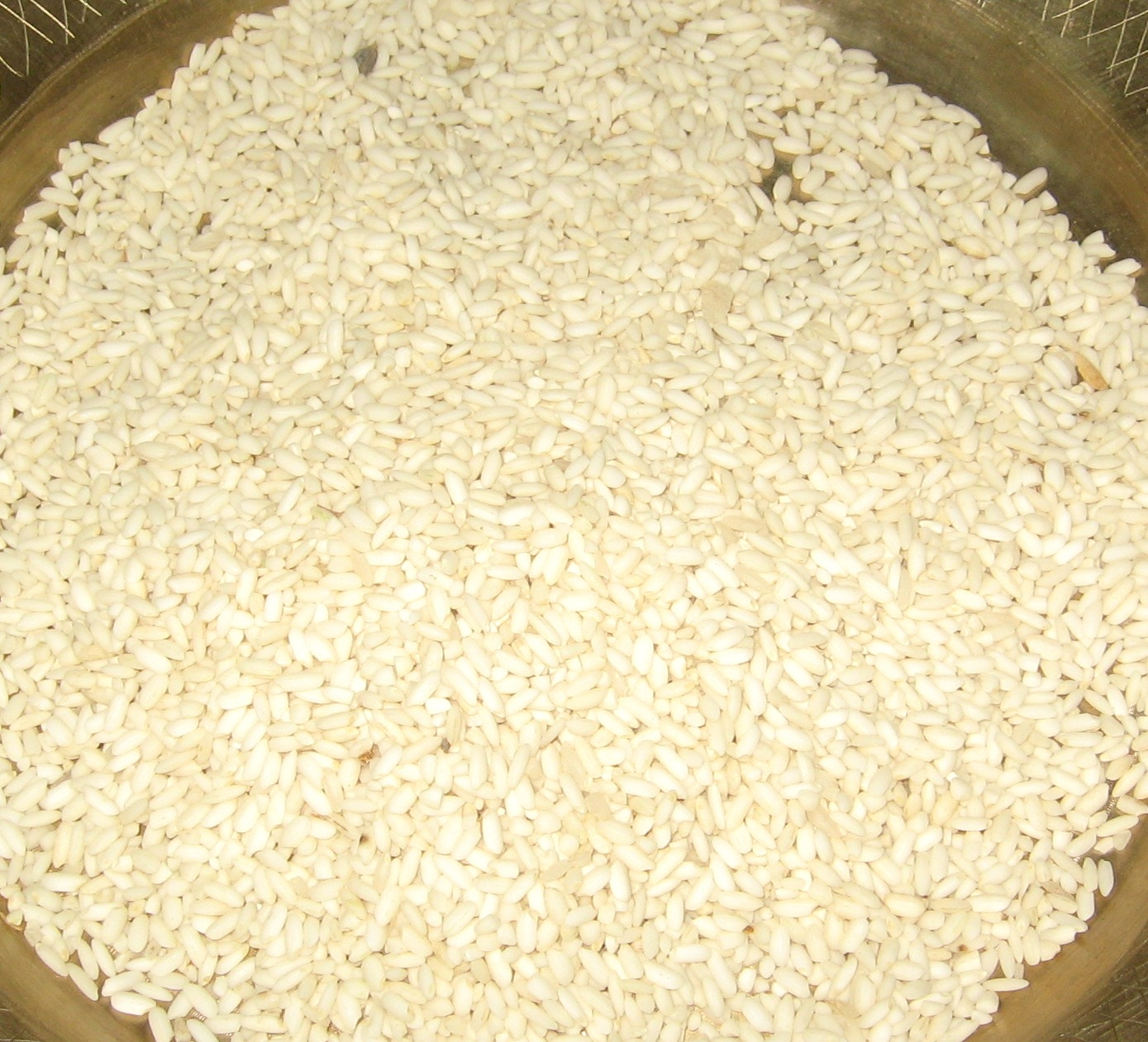
- Close-up of Bora Chaul rice
- Description: Bora Chaul is a rice variety cultivated in Assam
- Area: Assam
- Country: India
- Official website: ipindia.gov.in

Bora saul is a variety of glutinous rice found in Assam, India. It has an important role in festivals of Assam. During traditional occasions like Bihu, this variety of rice is eaten with served with doi (curd), gur (jaggery) and cream.

Bora saul is different from the rice consumed in mainland India and is more aligned with the type of sticky rice consumed in Southeast Asian cuisine. One variation of bora saul is kola (black) bora saul, or black sticky rice.

Bora saul is used in various other dishes, such as jolpan (snacks) and pitha (rice cakes or pancakes). Boiled bora saul is served as jolpan with curd or milk, jaggery or sugar. Soaked and ground bora saul is used in preparing pitha.

Some local entrepreneurs are also experimenting with using bora saul to create commercially available rice-based alcoholic brews.

== See also ==
- Chokuwa saul
- Joha saul
