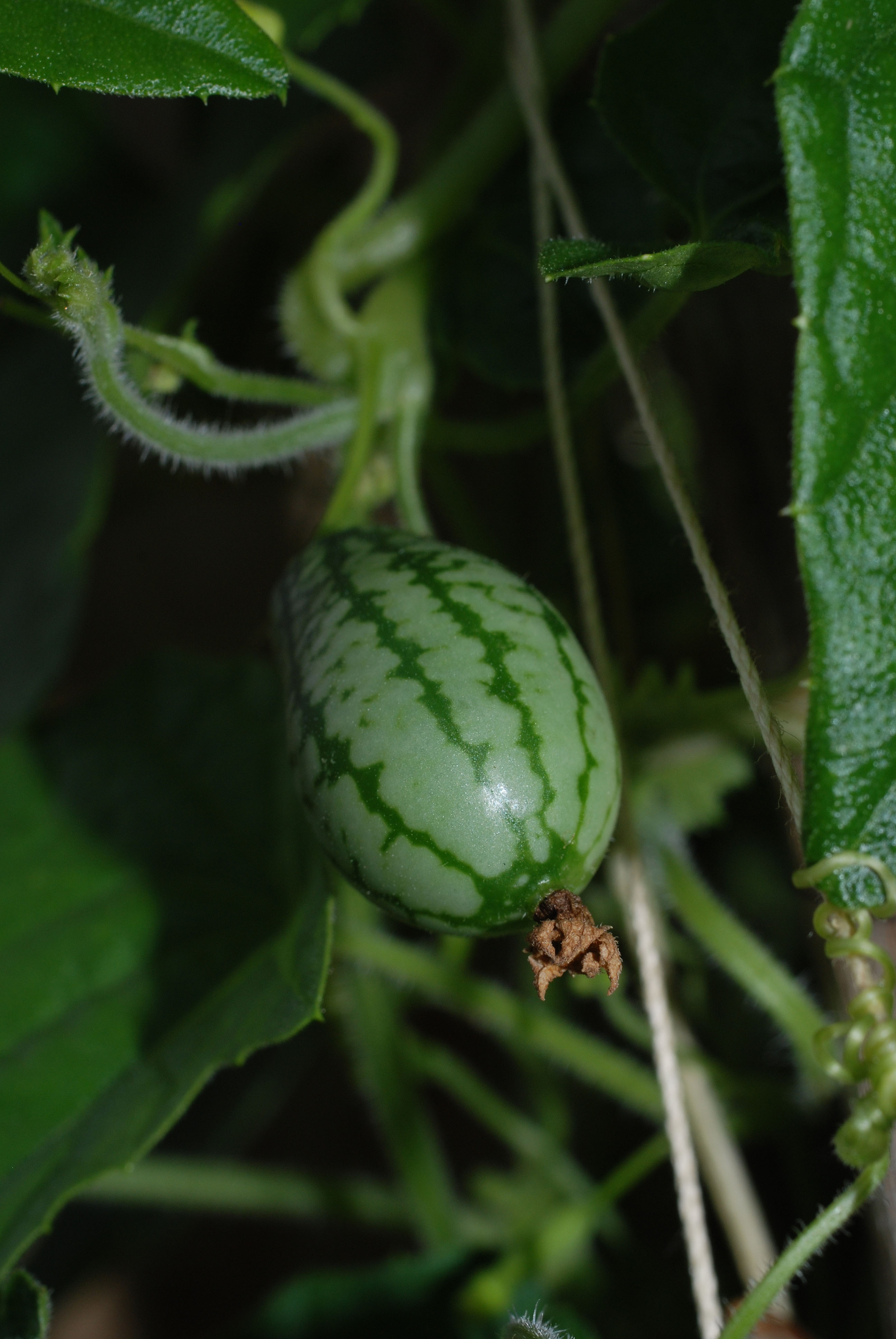
- Vine with fruit

Scientific classification
- Kingdom: Plantae
- Clade: Tracheophytes
- Clade: Angiosperms
- Clade: Eudicots
- Clade: Rosids
- Order: Cucurbitales
- Family: Cucurbitaceae
- Genus: Melothria
- Species: M. scabra

Binomial name
- Melothria scabra Naudin

Synonyms
- Melothria costensis C.Jeffrey; Melothria donnell-smithii var. hirtella Cogn.; Melothria donnell-smithii var. rotundifolia Cogn.

= Melothria scabra =

Species of flowering plant

Melothria scabra, commonly known as the cucamelon, Mexican miniature watermelon, Mexican sour cucumber, Mexican sour gherkin, mouse melon, or pepquino, is a species of flowering plant in the cucurbit family grown for its edible fruit. Its native range spans Mexico to Venezuela. Fruits are about the size of grapes and taste like cucumbers with a tinge of sourness. It may have been eaten by indigenous peoples before the European colonization of the Americas began.

== Description ==
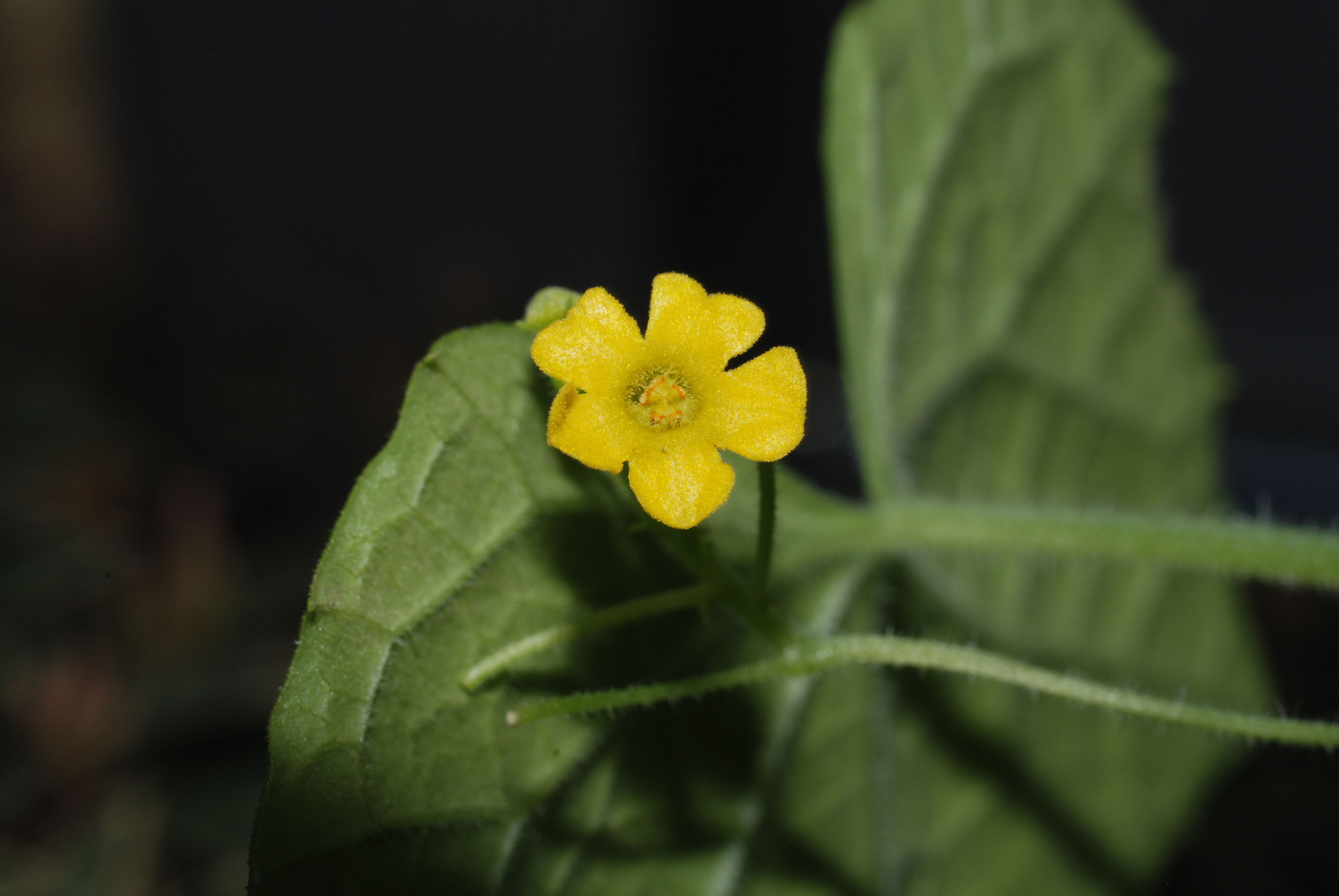
Melothria scabra female flower

Melothria scabra is a vine similar in morphology to Melothria pendula. It has a climbing habit, and typically grows 2.5–3 m (8.2–9.8 ft) tall. It is fast growing: germination under favourable conditions takes approximately 10 days, with plants reaching maturity in approximately 60–75 days. It is a perennial species, but as it is not frost hardy it is often grown as an annual. Its leaves have three or five lobes, and are 3–7 cm (1.2–2.8 in) in length and width. The leaf margin is undulate or dentate, the apex is caudate, and the leaf base is cordate. The leaf surface is scabrous; the upper surface is covered with small hairs called trichomes. Similar to some types of cucumber, these plants are monoecious, producing both male (staminate) and female (pistillate) flowers on the same plant. Flowers are small and yellow, and are approximately 4 mm (0.2 in) in diameter. Unusually for the cucurbits, the female flowers appear before the male flowers. These plants can pollinate themselves, but the individual flowers are not self-fertile. Each plant can produce hundreds of fruits, which develop at the base of the female flowers (the ovaries are inferior). Fruits are olive-shaped, grow to 2.5–4 cm (1.0–1.6 in) in length, and 1.5–2.5 cm (0.6–1.0 in) in width, and are green with dark green stripes. In contrast to the fruits of most other wild species in the cucurbit family, the fruit of Melothria scabra has a sweet rather than bitter flesh. Plants are drought resistant and pest-resistant relative to other cucumbers.

== Etymology ==
=== Binomial name ===
The genus name Melothria is from Ancient Greek μηλοθρων: mēlothrōn 'kind of white grape' in reference to small grapevine fruits born by the genus. The specific epithet scabra is Latin for 'rough, scabby'.

=== Common names ===
The English language common name 'cucamelon' arose in the 1980s; it is a portmanteau of 'cucumber' and 'melon'. The Spanish language common name 'sandita' translates as 'little watermelon'; its etymology is sandía 'watermelon' + ita, a suffix used to indicate something is small.

== Distribution and habitat ==
Melothria scabra is native to Colombia, El Salvador, Guatemala, Honduras, Mexico, (Note: In Mexico, Melothria scabra is native to the following WGSRPD level-3 floristic units: Mexico Central, Mexico Northeast, Mexico Northwest, Mexico Southeast, and Mexico Southwest.) Nicaragua, Panama, and Venezuela, where it grows in forests and thickets.

== Diseases ==
Melothria scabra is susceptible to infection by Pseudoperonospora cubensis, a plant pathogen that causes cucurbit downy mildew. It is also susceptible to infection by another plant pathogen, Podosphaera xanthii, which causes powdery mildew. Plants are reported to be susceptible to infection by Cucumber mosaic virus.

== Cultivation ==
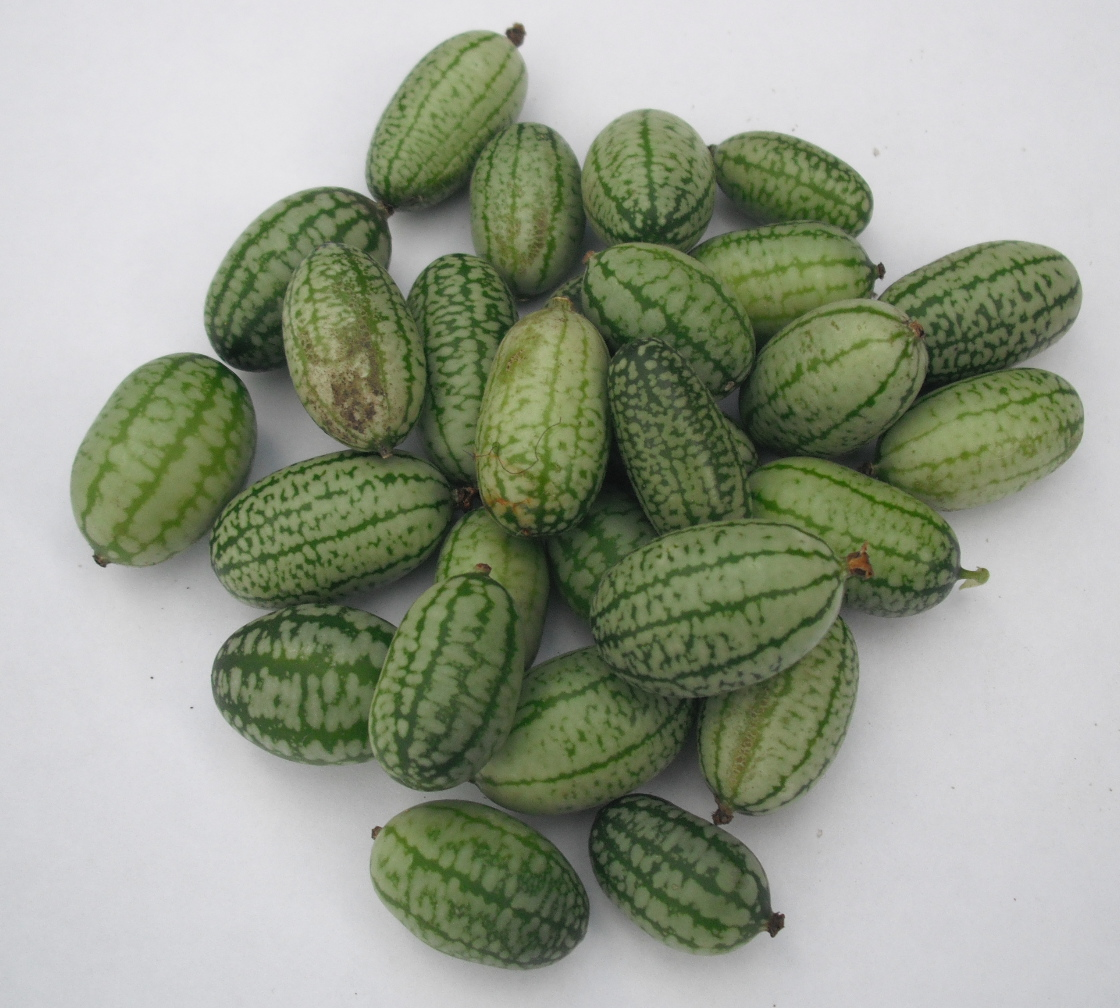
Melothria scabra fruits.

Melothria scabra is cultivated as a minor crop for its fruits, which are eaten raw or pickled.
