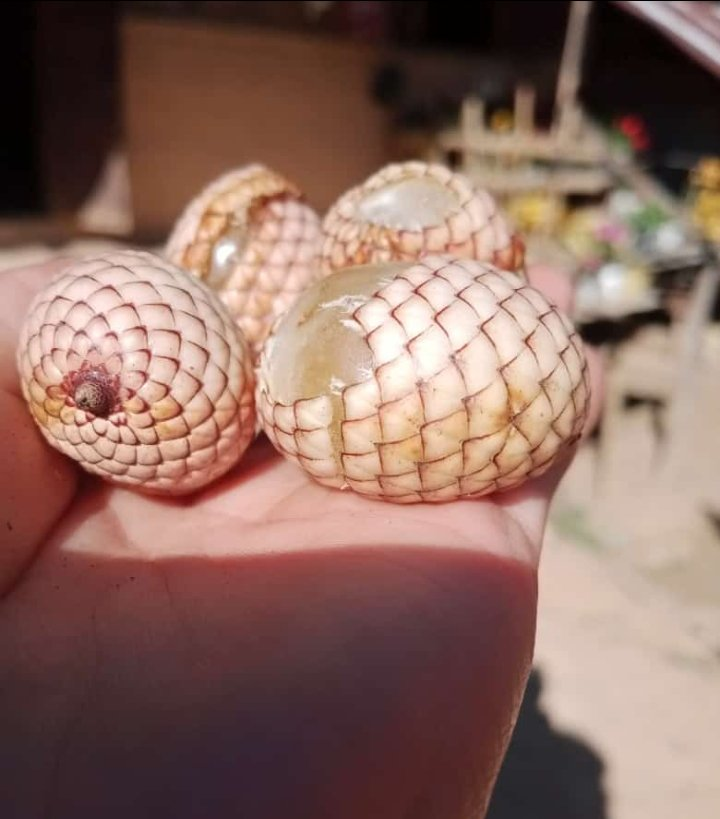
- Partially peeled fruits of Calamus erectus

Scientific classification
- Kingdom: Plantae
- Clade: Tracheophytes
- Clade: Angiosperms
- Clade: Monocots
- Clade: Commelinids
- Order: Arecales
- Family: Arecaceae
- Genus: Calamus
- Species: C. erectus

Binomial name
- Calamus erectus Roxb.

Synonyms
- Calamus collinus Griff.; Calamus erectus var. birmanicus Becc.; Calamus erectus var. collinus (Griff.) Becc.; Calamus erectus var. erectus; Calamus erectus var. macrocarpus (Griff. ex. Walp.) Becc.; Calamus erectus var. schizospathus (Griff.) Becc.; Calamus macrocarpus Griff.; Calamus macrocarpus Griff. ex Mart.; Calamus macrocarpus Griff. ex Walp.; Calamus schizospathus Griff.; Palmijuncus collinus (Griff.) Kuntze; Palmijuncus erectus (Roxb.) Kuntze; Palmijuncus macrocarpus (Griff. ex Walp.) Kuntze; Palmijuncus schizospathus (Griff.) Kuntze

= Calamus erectus =

Species of plant

Calamus erectus, also known as viagra palm and locally as tynriew, tara, and zhi li sheng teng, is a flowering shrub in the family Arecaceae. The specific epithet (erectus) refers to the plant's habit of growing straight rather than creeping or climbing like many species of the genus Calamus.

== Distribution and habitat ==
Calamus erectus is native to Northeast India, Nepal, Bhutan, Bangladesh, Myanmar, Thailand, Laos, and the Chinese province of Yunnan. It has been introduced to the United States.

It grows wild in lower hill forests, especially on drier slopes, and is found frequently in the Tista and Rangit valleys. It also grows in lowland and montane rainforests or drier forests, especially on steep slopes, up to 1,400 meters (4,600 feet) in elevation.

== Description ==
Calamus erectus is a rattan palm, though unlike most rattans, does not climb but rather grows straight, reaching heights of up to 3 meters (9.8 feet). It has weakly clustering stems which measure up to 6 meters (20 feet) in length and 5 centimeters (2.0 inches) in diameter. The rachis bear up to 40 narrow leaves on each side, which are regularly arranged and slightly curved. They measure 60–80 centimeters (24–31 inches) in length and 3.5–5 centimeters (1.4–2.0 inches) in width. The veins are adaxial and abaxial and the margin is bristly. The stems may be upright or leaning. The leaf sheaths are dark green in color and are covered in dark brown hairs and have short rows of brown, flattened spines which measure up to 3.5 centimeters (1.4 inches) in length. Ocreas are present and have rows of short spines split into two. Knees, flagella, and cirri are absent. The petioles and rachis have whorls of yellow to white spines. The rachis measure up to 3 meters (9.8 feet) in length and the petiole measures 1.5 meters (4.9 feet) in length.

The inflorescences measure up to 2 meters (6.6 feet) in length and are not flagellate. The bracts of the inflorescences are tubular and are tattering at the tip. The calyx of the flower is 3-lobed and the lobes are apiculate, and the corolla is 3-petaled. The fruit is greenish when unripe and reddish-brown when ripe, and is ellipsoid in shape and measures 3–5 centimeters (1.2–2.0 inches) in length and 2–2.5 centimeters (0.79–0.98 inches) in width. The thin skin is covered in grooved scales. It normally contains 1 large, whitish seed which is edible but said to be bland in flavor and causes dry mouth when chewed. It germinates very quickly. The first seedling leaf is pinnate and the seedling grows at a fast rate. The plant grows well in a pot and can be grown as an ornamental in warm temperate to tropical climates. It is cold hardy to USDA zone 9b (25–30 °F or −4 – −1 °C).

== Uses ==
Although the canes are not useful for making furniture due to the short internodes, the Mising people of the Assam plains sometimes use the canes and leaves to make huts and chicken coops.

The fruits are sometimes used in folk medicine, as they are believed to hold antioxidant and anti-diabetic properties. The fruit is also central to the lunar new year celebrations practiced by the Meitei people, where it is offered to the deities of the Sanamahism religion.

The young shoots and leaves are sometimes eaten as a vegetable. In Bangladesh, the seeds are sometimes chewed as an alternative to betel nuts.

== Nutritional value ==
The fruit contains rich amounts of vitamins C, A, and E, as well as calcium, magnesium, and phosphorus.

== See also ==
- List of culinary fruits
- List of culinary vegetables
