= Bacopaside =

Class of chemical compounds

Bacopasides are triterpene saponins isolated from Bacopa monnieri.

Members of this class of compounds include:

- Bacopaside I, shows antidepressant-like effects in a mouse model
- Bacopaside II
- Bacopaside III
- Bacopaside IV
- Bacopaside V
- Bacopaside VI
- Bacopaside VII
- Bacopaside VIII
- Bacopaside IX
- Bacopaside X
- Bacopaside XI, shows nootropic activity in a mouse model
