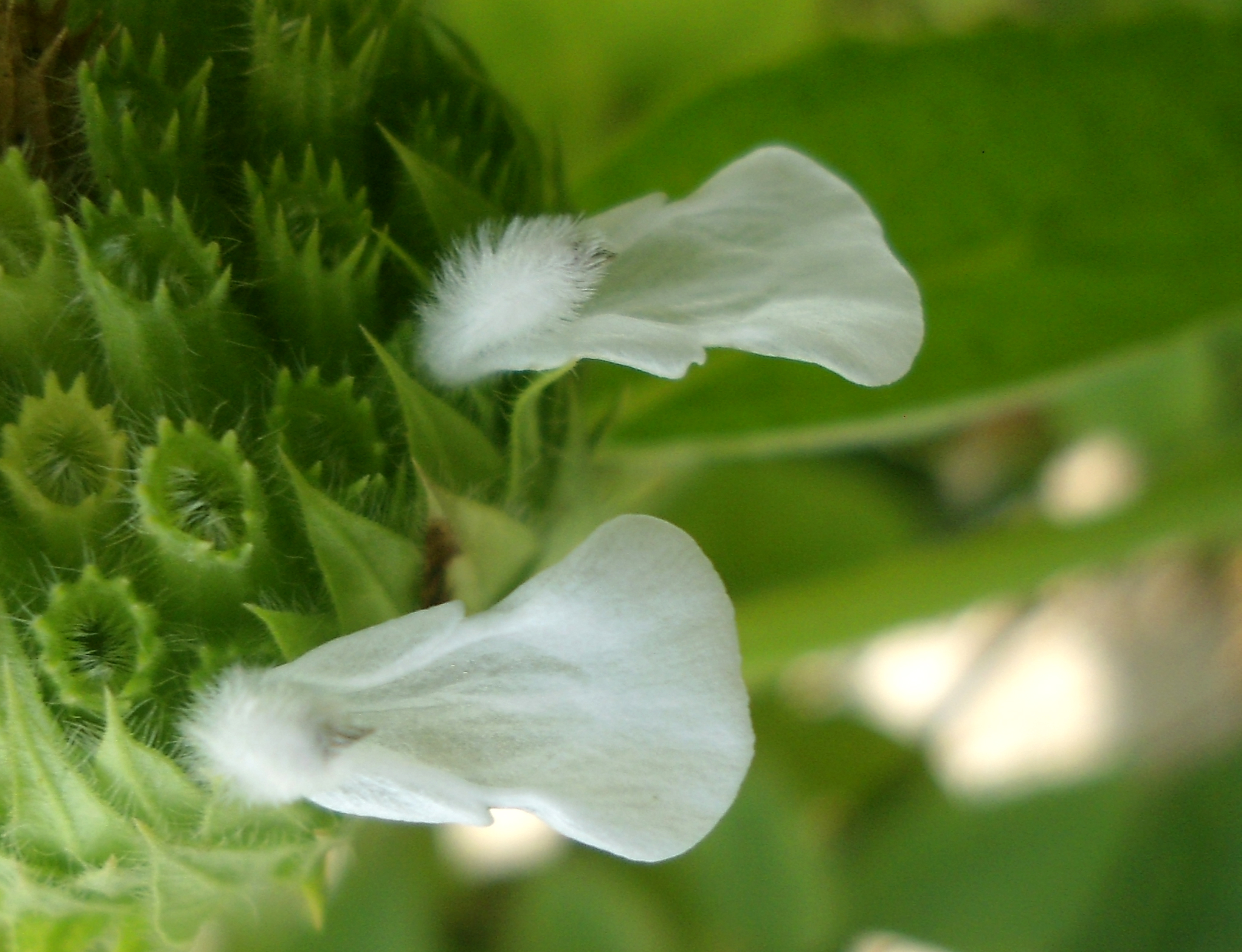

Scientific classification
- Kingdom: Plantae
- Clade: Tracheophytes
- Clade: Angiosperms
- Clade: Eudicots
- Clade: Asterids
- Order: Lamiales
- Family: Lamiaceae
- Genus: Leucas
- Species: L. longifolia

Binomial name
- Leucas longifolia Benth.

= Leucas longifolia =

Species of plant

Leucas longifolia, the long-leaf leucas, is a species of plant in the genus Leucas. It is an erect herb, a foot tall, with the stem leafless below. Leaves are narrowly linear, blunt or somewhat pointed at tip. It is found in Peninsular India.

In Assam it is locally known as doron or drona

== Gallery ==
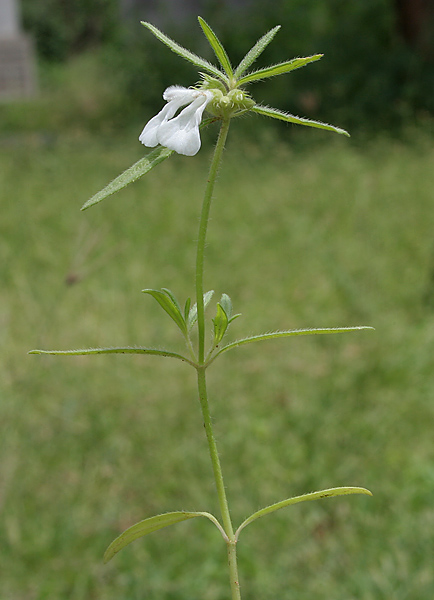
Leucas longifolia in Hyderabad, India.

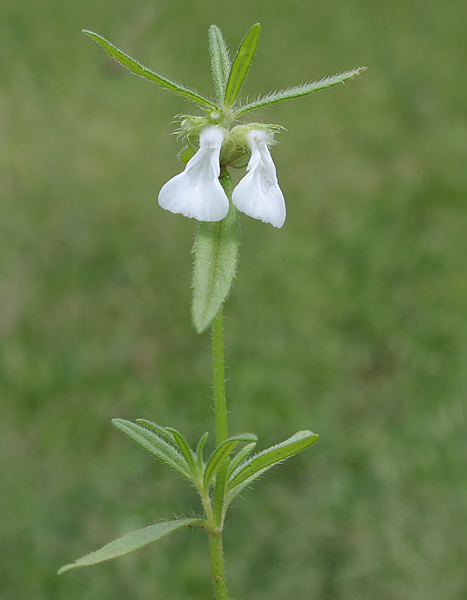
Leucas longifolia in Hyderabad, India.

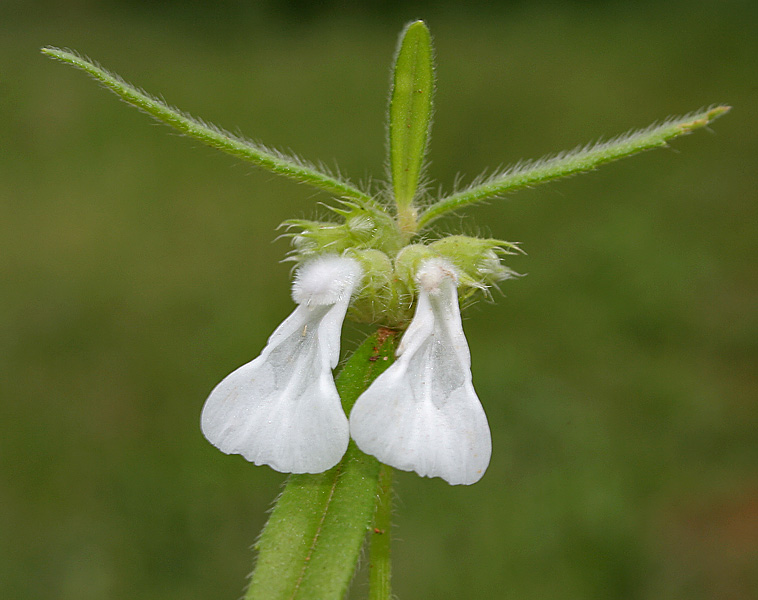
Leucas longifolia in Hyderabad, India.

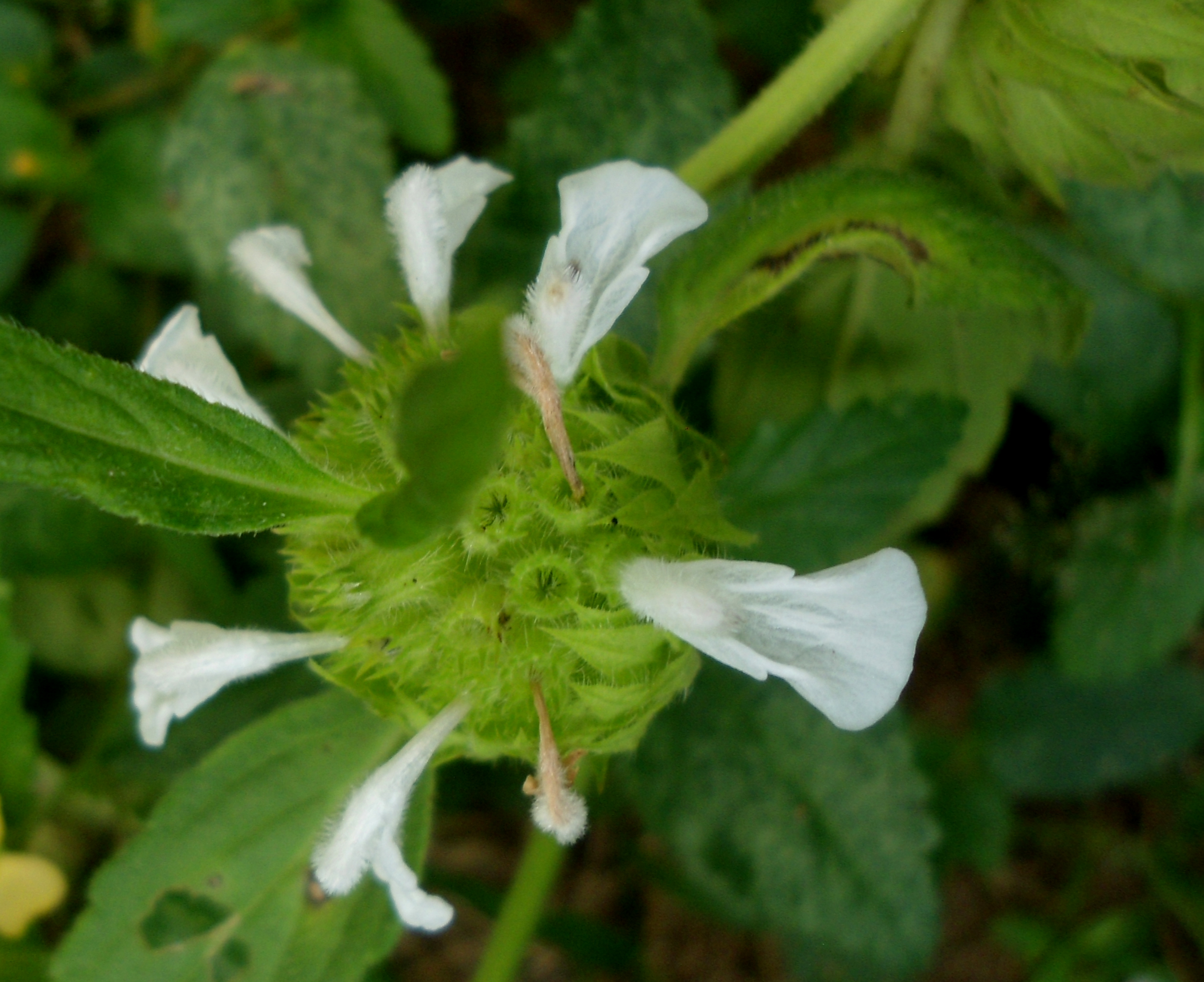
Leucas longifolia at Bhadrachalam
