= Assam lemon =

Lemons found in Assam, India

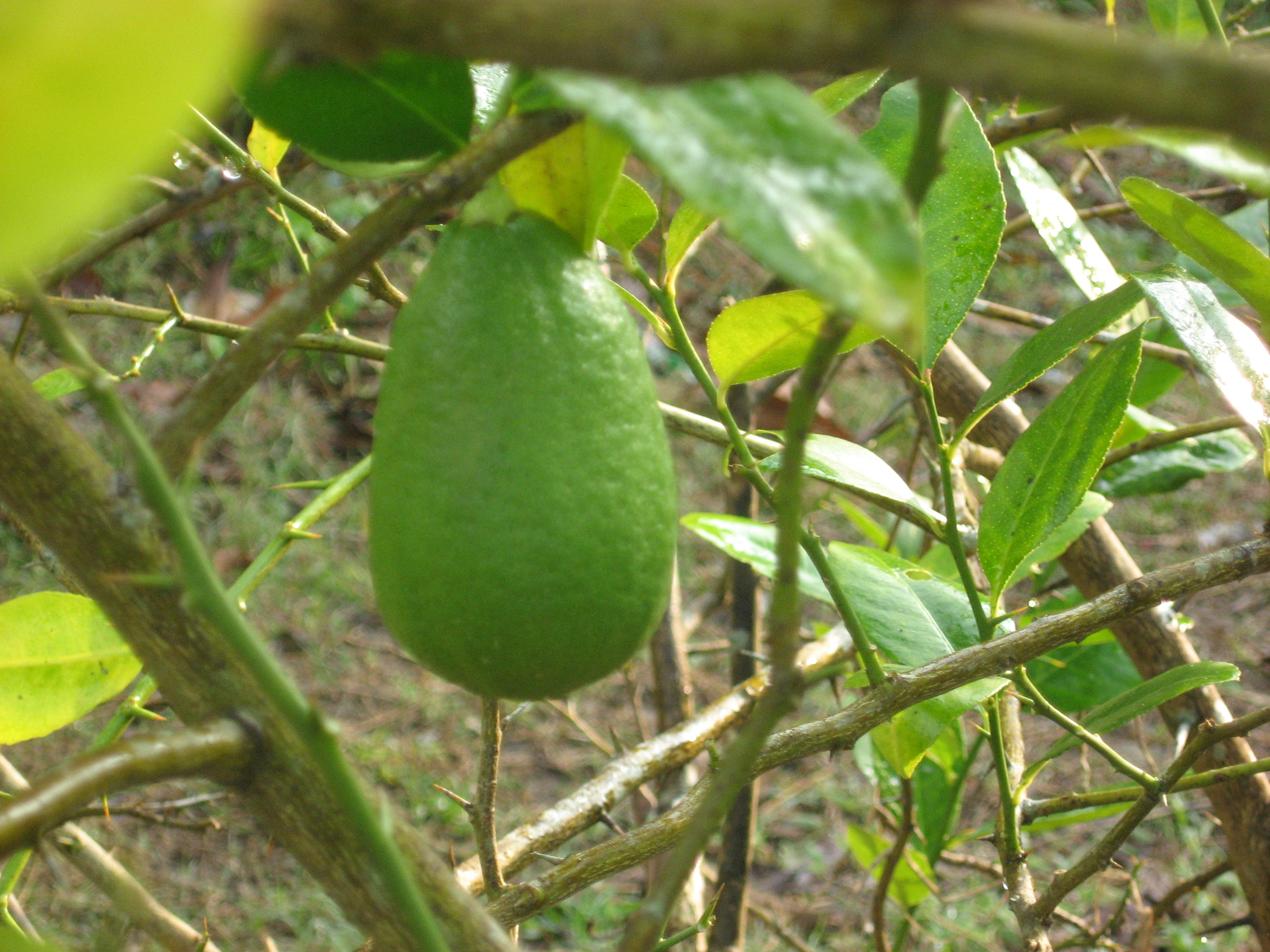
A Kaji Nemu

The Assam lemon, also known as nemu tenga in Assamese, are cultivars of lemon, which are found and cultivated in the Indian state of Assam.

Assam lemons are the state fruit of Assam, and are used for preparing refreshing drinks and pickles as well as garnishing curry and other dishes. Other citrus from Assam includes Jora Tenga, Bore Tenga, Elaichi Tenga etc.

== Varieties ==
=== Gol Nemu ===
Gol Nemu is similar to the other lemons found in India. Its botanical name is Citrus jambhiri. It is round but smaller than other varieties and has an aroma. It is sweeter than other lemons and Kaji Nemu. It has lots of medicinal value.When the lemon ripens, its colour changes to yellow and it becomes sweeter.

=== Kaji Nemu ===
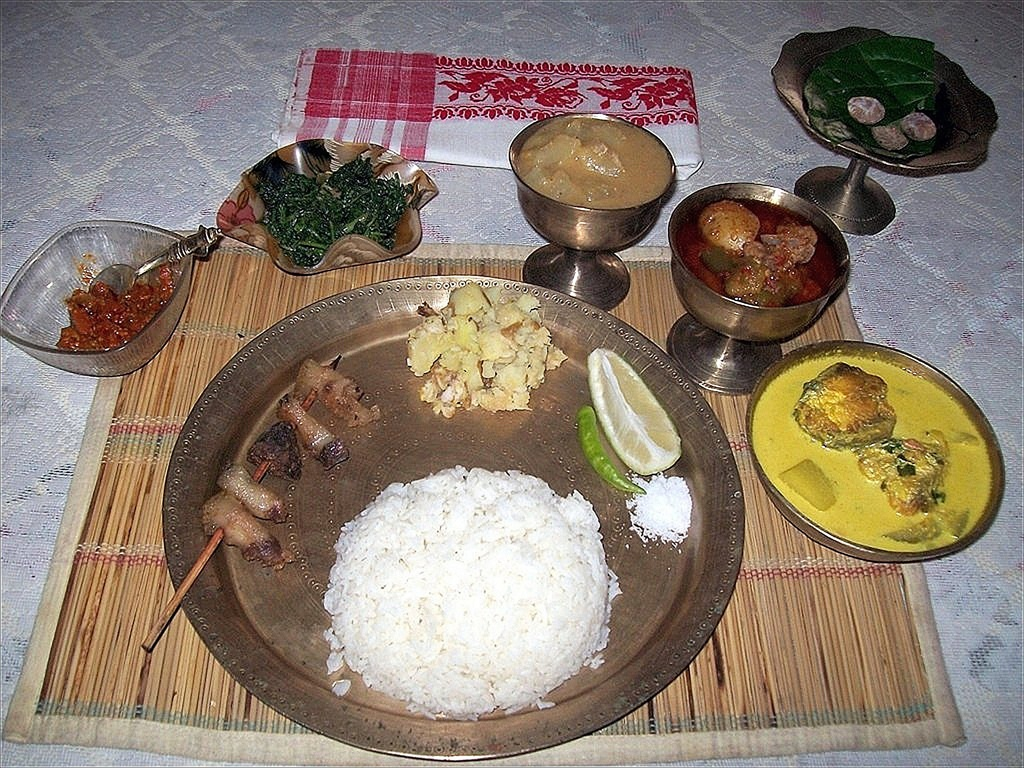
Kaji Nemu in Assamese Thali. It is in the upper right position to the rice, near salt and green chilli

Kaji Nemu is other variety of this lemon and is elongated and oblong compared to others and is also seedless. Its botanical name is Citrus limon and is a GI-certified product. This lemon is generally juicer than Gol Nemu due to its longer size. It is popular in Assam and is associated with Assamese cuisine. It is as generally larger than Gol Nemu and also turns yellow during ripening.

Major producing districts include Dibrugarh, Golaghat, Cachar, Chirang, Nalbari and Dima Hasao.

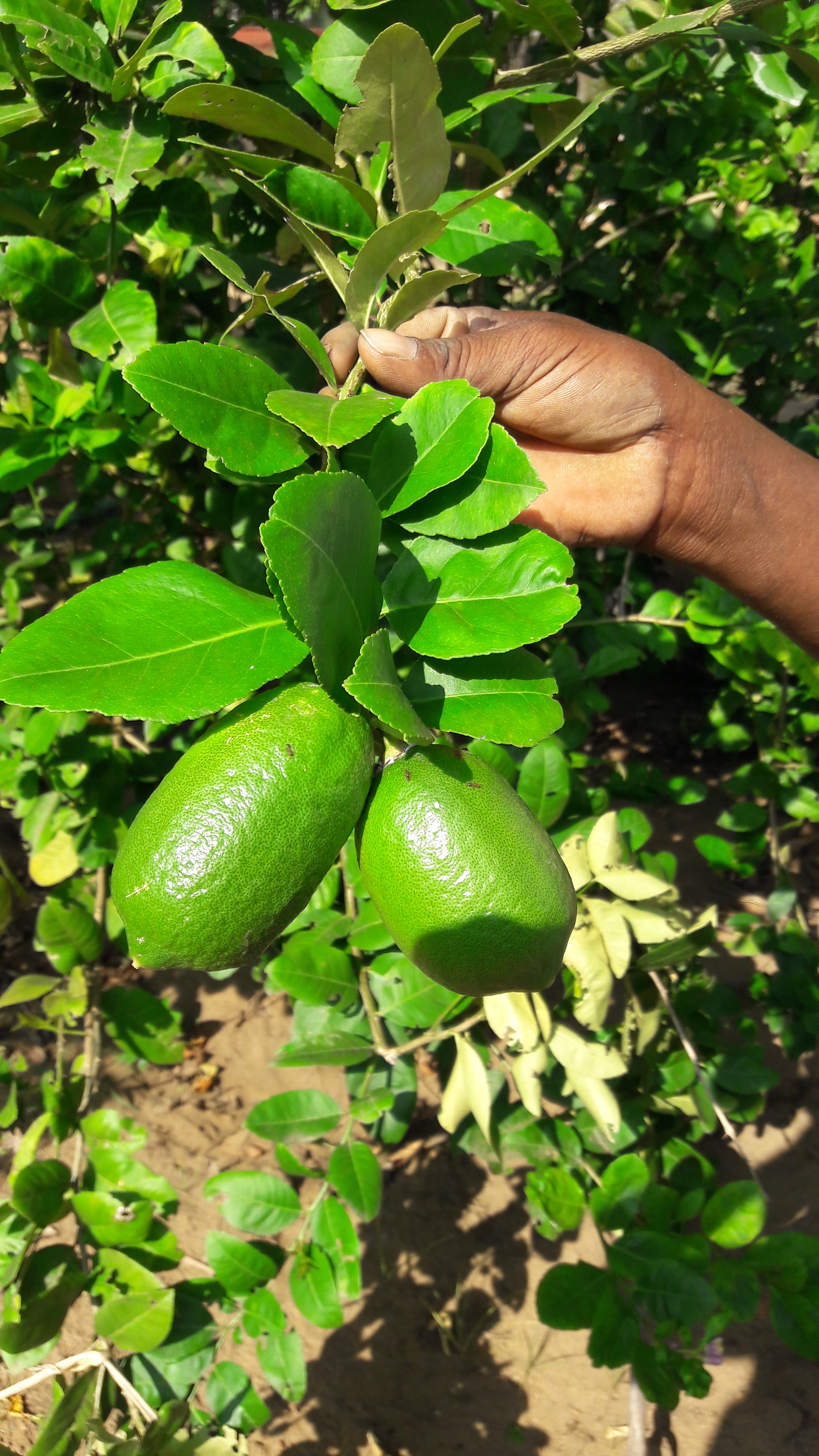
Kaji Nemu plant in Malappuram, Kerala, India

=== Comparison of some varieties ===
Name	Kaji nemu	Gol nemu	Jora tenga
Botanical Name	Citrus limon	Citrus jambhiri	Citrus medica
Growth Habitat	Bushy spreading	Erect	Erect
No. of fruits per plant	150 - 200	100 - 120	50 - 80
Length of fruit (cm)	7 - 9	4 - 5	10 - 15
Fruit weight (g)	90 - 100	40 - 60	120 - 180
Peel thickness (cm)	0.50 - 0.75	0.70 - 0.90	0.80 - 1.02
Juice per fruit (cm^{3})	22 - 25	16 - 18	20 - 23
Seeds per fruit	0	5 - 6	8 - 10
Acid (%)	3.0 - 3.3	2.8 - 3.0	2.0 - 2.5
No. of segments per fruit	9 - 12	6 - 8	11 - 15
TSS (^{0}Brix)	6.35 - 6.38	6.20 - 6.50	6.50 - 6.90
Ascorbic Acid (mg/ml)	1.50 - 1.65	1.20 - 1.45	0.90 - 1.10
