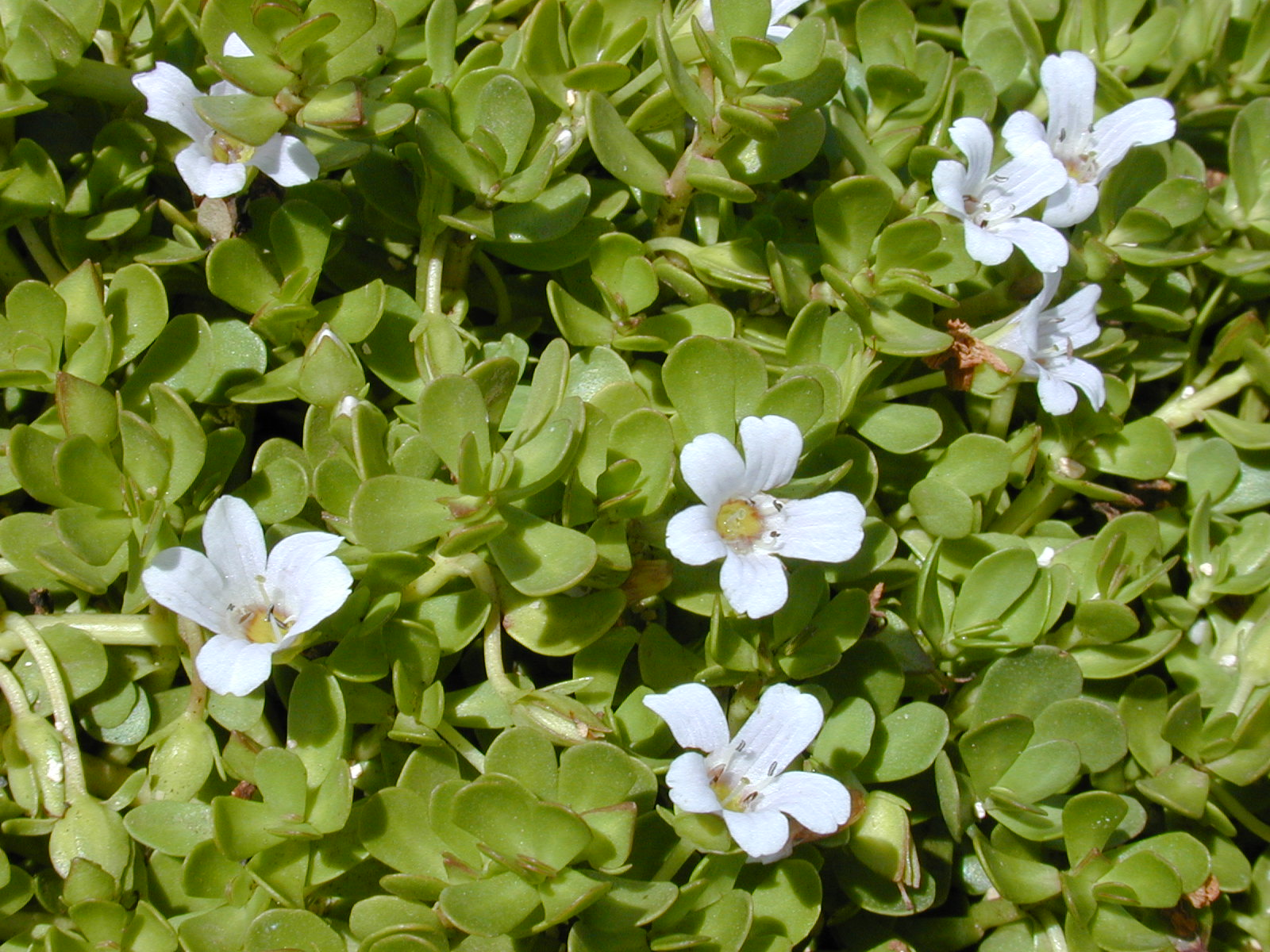

Conservation status
- Least Concern (IUCN 3.1)

Scientific classification
- Kingdom: Plantae
- Clade: Tracheophytes
- Clade: Angiosperms
- Clade: Eudicots
- Clade: Asterids
- Order: Lamiales
- Family: Plantaginaceae
- Genus: Bacopa
- Species: B. monnieri

Binomial name
- Bacopa monnieri (L.) Pennell

Synonyms
- Bacopa monniera Hayata & Matsum. Bramia monnieri (L.) Pennell; Gratiola monnieria L. Herpestes monnieria (L.) Kunth; Herpestis fauriei H.Lev. Herpestis monniera Herpestris monnieria Lysimachia monnieri L. Moniera cuneifolia Michx.

= Bacopa monnieri =

Species of aquatic plant

Bacopa monnieri, also known as water hyssop, brahmi, thyme-leafed gratiola, herb of grace, and Indian pennywort, is a perennial, creeping herb native to wetland areas globally. It is sold as an aquarium plant.

It is used in Ayurveda. In 2019, the US Food and Drug Administration (FDA) warned manufacturers of dietary supplement products containing Bacopa monnieri against making illegal and unproven claims that the herb can treat various diseases. There is inconclusive evidence of it improving cognitive performance and memory, and its safety and effectiveness remain uncertain.

== Description ==
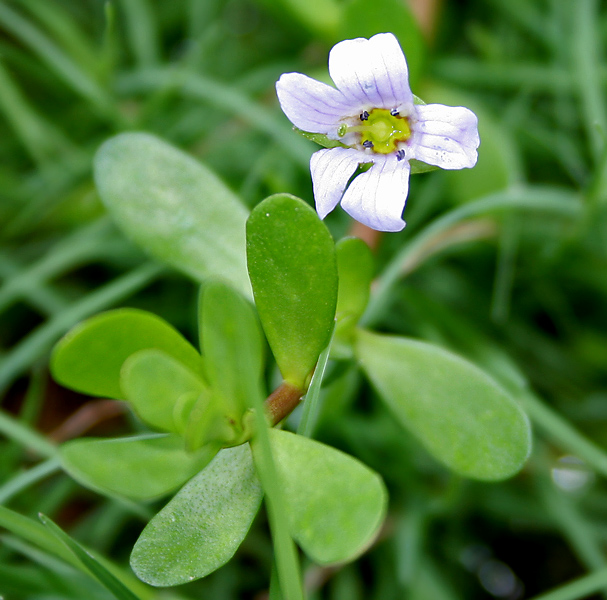
Bacopa monnieri in Hyderabad, India

Bacopa monnieri is a non-aromatic herb. The leaves of this plant are succulent, oblong, and 4–6 mm (0.16–0.24 in) thick. Leaves are oblanceolate and are arranged oppositely on the stem. The flowers are small, actinomorphic and white, with four to five petals. It can even grow in slightly brackish conditions. Propagation is often achieved through cuttings.

== Ecology ==
Bacopa monnieri is one of the most widespread Bacopa species. It commonly grows in marshy areas throughout India, Nepal, Sri Lanka, China, Pakistan, Taiwan, Vietnam, tropical and southern Africa, on Madagascar, in Australia, in the Caribbean as well as in Middle and South America. It is also found in Florida, Louisiana, Texas, and Hawaii.

It used to be found growing wild in freshwater swamps of Singapore and nearby regions known as beremi.

== Research and regulation ==
Bacopa monnieri is used in Ayurvedic traditional medicine in the belief it may improve memory and various ailments. There is no good evidence that it improves cognitive performance and memory, while its safety and effectiveness remain uncertain.

In 2019, the FDA issued warning letters to manufacturers of dietary supplements containing B. monnieri that advertised health claims for treating or preventing stomach disease, Alzheimer's disease, hypoglycemia, blood pressure, and anxiety were unproven and illegal. The FDA stated that no B. monnieri products have been approved for medical purposes.

=== Adverse effects ===
The most commonly reported adverse effects of B. monnieri in humans are nausea, increased intestinal motility, and gastrointestinal upset.

== Phytochemistry ==
The best characterized phytochemicals in Bacopa monnieri are dammarane-type triterpenoid saponins known as bacosides, with jujubogenin or pseudo-jujubogenin moieties as aglycone units. Bacosides comprise a family of 12 known analogs. Other saponins called bacopasides I–XII were identified. The alkaloids brahmine, nicotine, and herpestine have been catalogued, along with D-mannitol, apigenin, hersaponin, monnierasides I–III, cucurbitacin and plantainoside B.
