= Umakanta Bairagi =

Indian tokari geet musician (1942–2023)

Guru Umakanta Bairagi
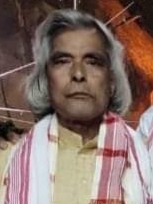

Background information
- Born: Umakanta Gogoi; 1942; Khowang, Dibrugarh, Assam Province, British India
- Died: 26 July 2023 (aged 80)
- Genres: Tokari geet
- Occupations: Musician, composer
- Instrument: Tokari

Umakanata 'Gogoi' Bairagi (1942 – 26 July 2023) was an Indian Tokari geet musician from Assam. He was a composer of over 1400 Tokari Geets and had expertise over various fields of folk music. In 1971, he was honoured with the title of 'Bairagi' by All India Radio Dibrugarh and in 2011, he was honoured with the title 'Guru' by the Ministry of Cultural Affairs. Bairagi received the Sangeet Natak Akademi Award for 2013–2014, as well as the Pratima Pandey Award and the Dr. Bhupen Hazarika Sanghati Award.

Umakanta Bairagi died on 26 July 2023 at the age of 80 at Guwahati's Hengrabari. His death was widely mourned across the state, and the Chief Minister of Assam Himanta Biswa Sarma also expressed his condolences.

== See also ==
- Music of Assam
- Culture of Assam
