= Music of Assam =

Overview of music traditions in Assam, India

The music of Assam consists various genres of folk and modern music, drawing its artistic basis from the history of Assam, from Assamese culture and its ancient traditions. In recent times, starting from the late eighties, popular artists have modernised the music catering to local popular demand.

A basic characteristic of the indigenous ethnic music of Assam is its descending scale similar to East Asian music which distinguishes it from the Mode-based or folk music (Raaga-based) forms from the rest of India.

The tunes are structured in a pyramid and are always in pentatonic scale similar to other traditional music of Asia like China, Mongolia etc and dissimilar from the seven-scaled Indian music, (in contrast to the music of rest of India which is Meend based), such as the Bihu songs, (common in South-East Asia and East Asia) besides languorous music of other forms.

The legend of Princess Usha of Sonitpur and her cohort Chitralekha also enlighten us on the musical expertise of the Assamese women. The connoisseurs however, have divided the classical Assamese music into two parts – Borgeet and Ojapali. The composers of Borgeets, Sankardev and his disciple Madhavdev added versatility to Assamese music.

== Musical genres ==
=== Devotional ===
- Dihanaam
- Harinaam
- Hiranaam

=== Indigenous Traditional Folk ===
- Bihu
- Bhawaiya
- Oi Nitom

=== Popular ===
- Goalpariya Lokogeet
- Kamrupi Lokgeet
- Ojapali
- Tokari Geet

== Musical instruments ==
- Banhi
- Sifung
- Bihu or Uja Dhul
- Tokari
- Dotara
- Gogona
- Khol
- Mridongo
- Nagara
- Pepa
- Taal
- Xutuli
- Doba
- Xinga
- Bor Tal
- Bin
- Paat
- Toka
- Kham
- Kham
- Muri
- Pati Dhul
- Joi Dhul
- Bor Dhul
- Dhepa Dhul
- Kahlia
- Toka
- Xinga
- Bortaal
- Huluxi
- Hutuli

== Early contributors to Assamese music ==
- Ambikagiri Raichoudhury
- Anima Choudhury
- Bishnuprasad Rabha
- Bhupen Hazarika
- Dipali Barthakur
- Jayanta Hazarika
- Jyoti Prasad Agarwala
- Khagen Mahanta
- Madhavdeva
- Parvati Prasad Baruva
- Pratima Baruah
- Ramen Baruah
- Rameshwar Pathak
- Sankardev
- Moghai Oja
- Tarawati Mili Bori

=== Other notable composers, musicians and singers ===
- Angaraag Mahanta
- Anurag Saikia
- Axl Hazarika
- Ayaan Anisur
- Beauty Sharma Barua
- Dhrubajyoti Phukan
- Dipak Sarma
- Jim Ankan Deka
- Joi Barua
- Kalpana Patowary
- Maitrayee Patar
- Mayukh Hazarika
- Nilotpal Bora
- Janam Raj
- Nirmalendu Choudhury
- Queen Hazarika
- Rameshwar Pathak
- Rudra Baruah
- Shankuraj Konwar
- Tarali Sarma
- Tarulata Kutum
- Zubeen Garg
