= A:bang =

A:bang or Mibu A:bang (Mising pronunciation: [aːbaŋ]) are the priestly songs of the Tani tribes. They are sung by a class of priests called "Mibu" for ritual purposes. Mibu-type priestly figures are found among the Mising people, Adi people and other Tani Tribes. Variations of the term occur across different regions and dialects, including Miri, Mibo, Nibu, and Nyibu, particularly among Adi groups such as the Padam, Pasi, Pangi, and Galo communities.

The main singer of the A:bang is referred to as a "Miri", while the chief priest responsible for conducting ritual and institutionalised ceremonies associated with the A:bang is known as a "Mibu". In Mising tradition, Mibu primarily denotes a priest. The term is etymologically interpreted as being derived from mi ("Man" or "mankind") and bu ("father"), giving the meaning "father of mankind". This interpretation is linked to the role of Mibus in reciting narratives concerning the origins and history of Tani people through ritual chants.

== Etymology ==
The origin of the term A:bang is not known. The element a:- may be interpreted as a prefix, though the meaning conveyed by the verbal roots bang and ba: remains unclear. In Mising language, expressions such as A:bang í: ("sing the A:bang") indicate that the verbal roots í: or íng are used to express the act of singing. This suggests that ba: in A:bang itself does not directly indicate the idea of "singing".

== Language ==
The language of the A:bang song is archaic and the song cannot be followed by ordinary people. It differs from the day-to-day spoken form of the Mising language and has sometimes been described as archaic or difficult to understand. However, it is not generally regarded as a separate classical language. Traditionally, the chants and their vocabulary have been transmitted orally from one Mibu to another, contributing to the continuity and preservation of the tradition.

== Composition and role in the Mising Community ==
The A:bang may be compared with the Puranas of Sanskrit literature and the Sages of the Tentons. They exist in the memory of a special class of Miris and even among them only the most experienced and learned remember them correctly and understood and can explain their exact significance

— Sarat Chandra Roy's remark on A:bang

In Mising oral tradition, A:bangs preserve narratives relating to the creation of the universe and the origins of humankind. These chants describe cosmological concepts, including the structure of the universe, celestial realms, and the genealogy of divine and human ancestors. It is also used by the Mibus to tell the history of the Mising tribe, and the genealogy of their different clans. (Note: Mibu is the traditional priest of the Mising People.)

According to Mibu A:bangs, the creation of the universe and the origins of humankind are preserved through oral chants. Mising cosmology describes the universe as consisting of three realms: Regy-Regam (the Kingdom of Gods), Dong-Among (the Earth), and Ui-Among (the abode of spirits). Together these realms form the celestial order known as Keyum. Man on earth is the progeny of Seyhdy Babu (Seyhdy-father) and Melo Na:ne (Melo-mother). Seyhdy Babu was thus the first father of all human generation on the earth, as per Mibu Ahbangs.

=== Role of Mibu in A:bang ===
The Mibus (priests who perform A:bang) are thought to be gifted individuals who develop a quality of rare eloquence and power of observation since their childhood. It is believed that they attain a state of spiritual-embodiment called Paro-Anam. When called for diagnosis and treatment of the sick, they narrate the suffering of the sick before the Creator and fore-fathers and pray for their mercy. The ritual (Mibu-Dagdam) is carried out by narrating A:bangs. For instance, when the soul of the sick is believed to go above death, the Mibu reminds the soul of the inviting grandeur of Nature through verse. An example of such a chant, rendered in the Miri-Abor language, runs:

"Dermi Situnge Tirmeko Tirmanga / Kombong Appune Riyipko Reyoba."

— Normal C. Pegu, The Miri or Mishing of the Brahmaputra valley, Chapter IV, dilect

This translates to "the offshoots of the Dermi trees are bowing, the flowers of Kombong trees are yielding to the breeze that is coming."

=== Decline of A:bang ===
In the Mising society, the A:bangs have been replaced by the more popular Oi Nitom and modern songs. The Mibu is also in the verge of extinction because of the Neo-Vaishavith, and the influence of Hinduism among the Misings.
