= Ko Yad =

- Film poster
- Assamese: কঃয়াদ
- Directed by: Manju Borah
- Written by: Manju Borah; Anil Panging (dialogue)
- Based on: Ko: Yad by Anil Panging
- Produced by: Manju Borah
- Cinematography: Sudhir Palsane
- Edited by: A. Sreekar Prasad
- Music by: Isaac Thomas Kottukapally
- Release date: 2012
- Country: India
- Language: Mising

Ko Yad (Assamese: ক য়াদ; lit. 'A Silent Way') is a 2012 Mising drama film, written, directed and produced by Manju Borah. The movie is based on Anil Panging's novel Ko: Yad, published in the weekly Assamese Xadin. The film portrays the life of ordinary Mishing people through the protagonist, Poukam, struggle to make a living, in a small village by the Brahmaputra, in Assam.

At the 60th National Film Award for 2012, the film won the awards for Best Mising Film, and Best Cinematography Award.

== Background ==
The Poukam is a school dropout, who makes a living collecting driftwood from the river Brahmaputra in a boat that he inherited from his father. He faces many difficulties in life. His father collects wood from the river. The movie picturizes Poukam's life, starting from his youth to his old age. But hardworking Poukam, was always put into trouble by his own friends, loan-givers and his son. At last, even the river betrayed him.

== Cast ==
- Xewan Xing Yein
- Mahika Sharma
- Tarulata Kutum
- Janaraj Yein
- Diganta Panging

== Production ==
The film was shot for 25 days starting from 4 July 2012 at the tourist destination of Disangmukh in Assam. The co-directors are- Lohit Dutta, Phul Dauka, Ghanashyam Kalita, Rupam Chetiya and Dibakar Pegu. The film was edited by A. Sreekar Prasad, and music direction is by Isaac Thomas Kottukapally. The film is created in 35mm cinemascope using Dolby Sound technology, under the banner of AAAS Production. Costumes were designed by Jiban Dauka.

== Release and reception ==
Ko: Yad has been praised a lot. At the Bengaluru International Film Festival's Chitrabharati section, judge S.K. Bhagawan has said, "Ko: Yad has presented little described story of Mising villagers very well".

== Display and honors ==
- Best director's award, Ladakh International Film Festival.
- Good film honor, The Indian Films Competition Jury. Best film award, Bengaluru International Film Festival, 2–26 December 2013.
- Shown on15th Mumbai Film Festival
- Best Mising Film, 60th National Film Awards, 2012
- Best Cinematography Award, 60th National Film Awards.
