= Indira Miri =

Indian educationist

- Born: 1910; Shillong, Assam, India
- Died: 4 September 2004 (aged 93–94); Silpukhuri, Guwahati, Assam, India
- Other name: Mereng
- Spouse: Mohi Chandra Miri
- Children: Utpal, Mrinal Miri and a daughter
- Parent(s): Sonadhar Senapati (father), Dibyakanti (mother)
- Awards: Padma Shri; Sankardev Award

Indira Miri (1910–2004), popularly known as Mereng, was an Indian educationist from Assam, known for her efforts in promoting education in the North East Frontier Agency. She was a recipient of the fourth highest Indian civilian honour of Padma Shri.

== Biography ==
Indira Senapati alias Indira Miri was born to Mishing family, indigenous community of Assam. Born in 1910 in Shillong, Miri lost her mother at an early age and was brought up by her father, Sonadhar Senapati, who sent her to Kolkata for school and college studies which she started at Bethune School and completed with a BA from Scottish Church College. Later she obtained a degree in education (BT) from St. Mary's College of Teacher Education, Guwahati and did advanced training course in Montessori system in Ahmedabad on a government scholarship where she was trained by Maria Montessori. Another government scholarship helped her to travel to the UK to secure a master's degree from the University of Edinburgh and a three-month training at Oxford University.

On her return to India in 1947, Miri was appointed as the Chief Education Officer of NEFA with her base at Sadiya, a small Assamese town and worked among the tribals for ten years. During the earthquake of 1950, Miri and her fellow teachers were known to have worked for bringing relief to the people of the region. She resigned from NEFA service in 1957 to join the Jorhat BT College as it principal and worked there till her retirement in 1969. She also served the Gauhati University as a member of its executive council.

During the late 1880s, Sjt. Sonadhar Senapati who was a well educated Assamese man and was working in a good position at the Assam Secretariat at Shillong represented the problems of the oppressed castes and tribes of Assam in front of the British. During the meeting he met Mr. Mohi Chandra Miri who represented the Mising Tribe in the meeting. Sonadhar Senapati was impressed with the Charming personality of Mr. Miri. Sonadhar Senapati breaking all the stereotypes of the society during that time, arranged his daughter's (Indira Senapati's) marriage with Mr. Mahi Miri who later became the Chief Conservator of Kaziranga National Park.Sonadhar Senapati was also the founder of [Asom Bania Sabha], a dalit organization of Assam during the early period of 19th Century.

Miri died on 5 September 2004 at the age of 94, at her ancestral home in Silpukhuri. She had had three children. One of her sons, Mrinal Miri, is an educationist, writer and a member of Rajya Sabha.

The Government of India awarded the civilian honour of Padma Shri in 1977 and she received the Sankardev Award in 2004. Her life has been documented in two biographies, one a fictionalized biography, Mereng, written by Anuradha Sharma Pujari, published in 2010 and the other, Bisishta sikshabida Indira Miri, by Hiranmayi Dewi, published in 2001.

== Publications ==
- Mahendramohana Caudhurī, 1984
- Mahatma Gandhi's educational theory

== See also ==
- Anuradha Sharma Pujari
- Maria Montessori
