= Tarulata Kutum =

Indian singer and actress from Assam

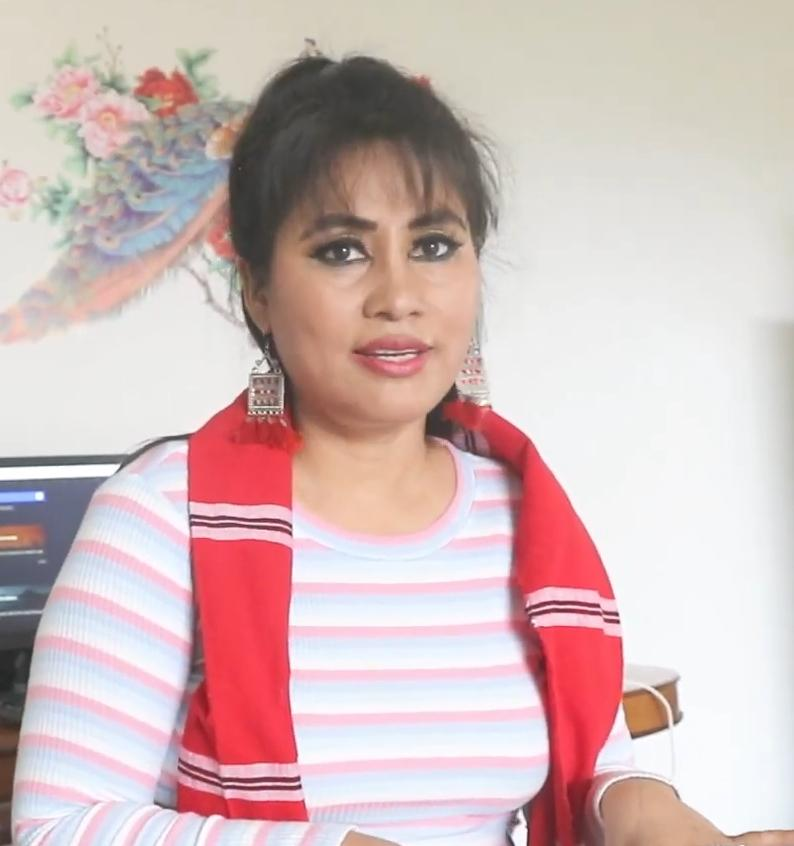
- Kutum in 2020

Background information
- Born: Assam, India
- Origin: Mising community, Assam, India
- Genres: Assamese folk, Assamese music
- Occupations: Singer, composer, performer, actress
- Label: TK productions
- Spouse: Benil Bori

Tarulata Kutum is an Indian singer, composer, lyricist, and actress from the Mising community. She is known for her recordings and performances in the Mising language and for popularising Oi Nitom, a traditional Mising song form. Her work combines elements of Assamese popular music with indigenous folk melodies, and she has appeared in regional concerts and music festivals across Northeast India. She has also appeared in films such as Ko:Yad, which became the first mising-language film to win a national award.

== Career ==
Kutum believes that good films can be appreciated beyond language barriers. Speaking about Ko Yad, she said that audiences, including foreigners at the International Film Festival of India, could understand and enjoy its story. She described the film as one of her most difficult roles and mentioned that she had once thought of leaving the project. Directed by Manju Borah, Ko: Yad became the first Mising-language film to win a National Film Award. Kutum is also known as a playback singer in Assam and has performed with artists such as Zubeen Garg.

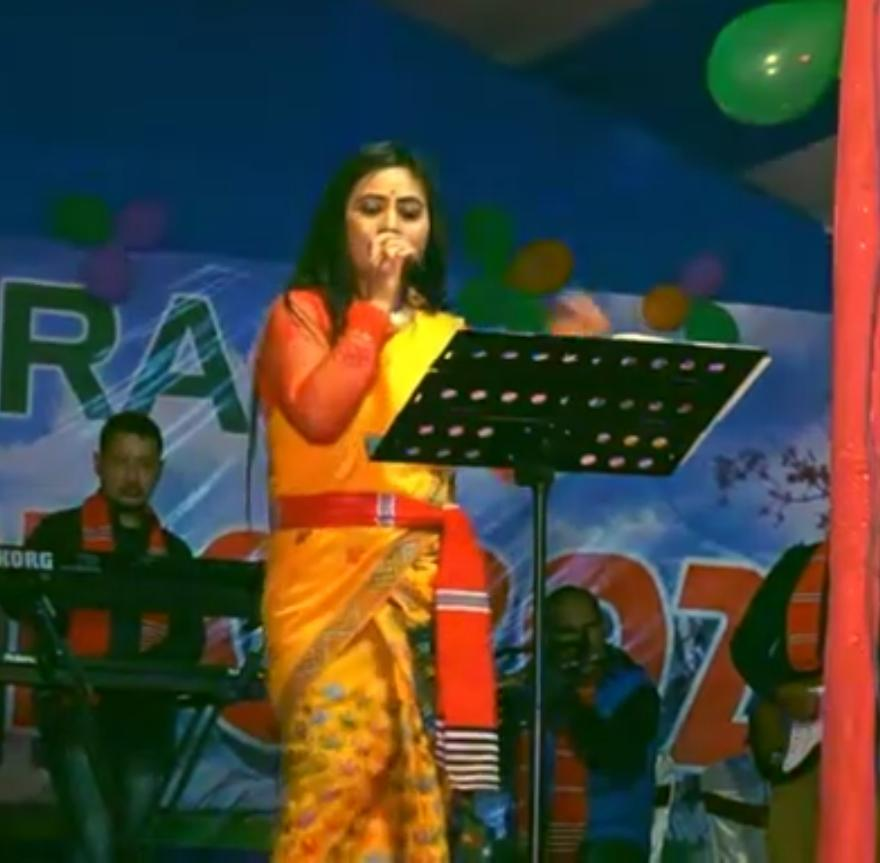
Tarulata Kutum performing live in 2021

In addition to studio work, Kutum performs in live concerts and cultural events that promote indigenous traditions of Assam. In 2012, she appeared in Samanway, a cross-community concert in Guwahati that featured artists representing different ethnic groups of the Northeast. She has also been featured at festivals celebrating Mising heritage and Assamese folk festivals. Her performances combine indigenous Mising melodies with Assamese folk elements, showcasing the cultural diversity of Assam. Speaking at the 2015 Rongali festival in Guwahati, she highlighted the challenges faced by regional artistes in exploring opportunities outside the state due to a lack of financial support. She also expressed optimism that government initiatives and cultural festivals could help promote local talent and preserve traditional art forms. In November 2023, Kutum performed at the Raas Mahotsav organised by the Nalduar Yuvak Kristi Sangha in Namoni Majuli. The festival, one of the major cultural events of the island, featured performances across more than fifty stages and twelve satras (Vaishnavite monasteries). Kutum appeared on both days of the two-day celebration, which forms a central part of Majuli's Sattriya cultural tradition.

Kutum has also produced and acted in many mising films.

== Filmography ==
Year	Title	Language	Notes	Ref(s)
2010	Xorubhoni	Assamese	Self produced under TK productions	
2012	Ko:Yad	Mising	Directed by Manju Borah	
2013	Adhyay	Assamese	Feature film directed by Arup Manna	
2020	Ater Kapyok Ai'na	Mising	Self produced under TK productions	

== Discography ==
=== Singles and EPs ===
Year	Title	Collaborators
2020	Ginmur Po Lo	Single
2020	7th Mising Youth Festival 2020 Theme Song	Festival track
2021	Misingoi Rengama	Single
2021	Kangkan	Simanta Shekar
2021	Kerela Tita Tita	Zubeen Garg
2021	Tractor Gari	
2021	Jaan Oi	Zubeen Garg
2021	Ronga Nilake	Featured duet
2022	Fifty Fifty	Rakesh Riyan
2022	Ahotor Tolote	Collaboration
2023	Nok Amik Berra Kanamdem	Official video single
2024	Party Koru Chal	Mousam Gogoi
2024	Oiya Midange	Justan Doley
2024	Badulide Tuladkang	Single
2025	America London	Single
2025	Lena Apong	Toto Mili
2025	Nagalandor Nagini	Krishnamoni Chutia

=== Music videos ===
Year	Title	Singer(s)	Cast	Director	Producer(s)	Label / Studio
2023	Nok Amik Berra Kanamdem	Tarulata Kutum, Devaram Doley	Binod Pegu, Tarulata Kutum, Benil Bori, Tapi Panyang	Bhaskar Jyoti Doley	—	TK productions
2024	Diginiso Sikiriso	Tarulata Kutum, Pankaj Joan Taye	Tarulata Kutum, Tezu Megu	Aja Tarak	Dilip Pegu	TK productions
2024	iPhone Lage Maa	Tarulata Kutum	Tarulata Kutum, Anu Bosomotary, Bulu Morang	—	—	TK Production
2024	Badulide Tuladkang	Tarulata Kutum, Sisu Narah	—	—	—	TK productions

== See also ==
- Oi Nitom
- Mising people
