= Maitrayee Patar =

Indian Singer and Writer (born 1990)

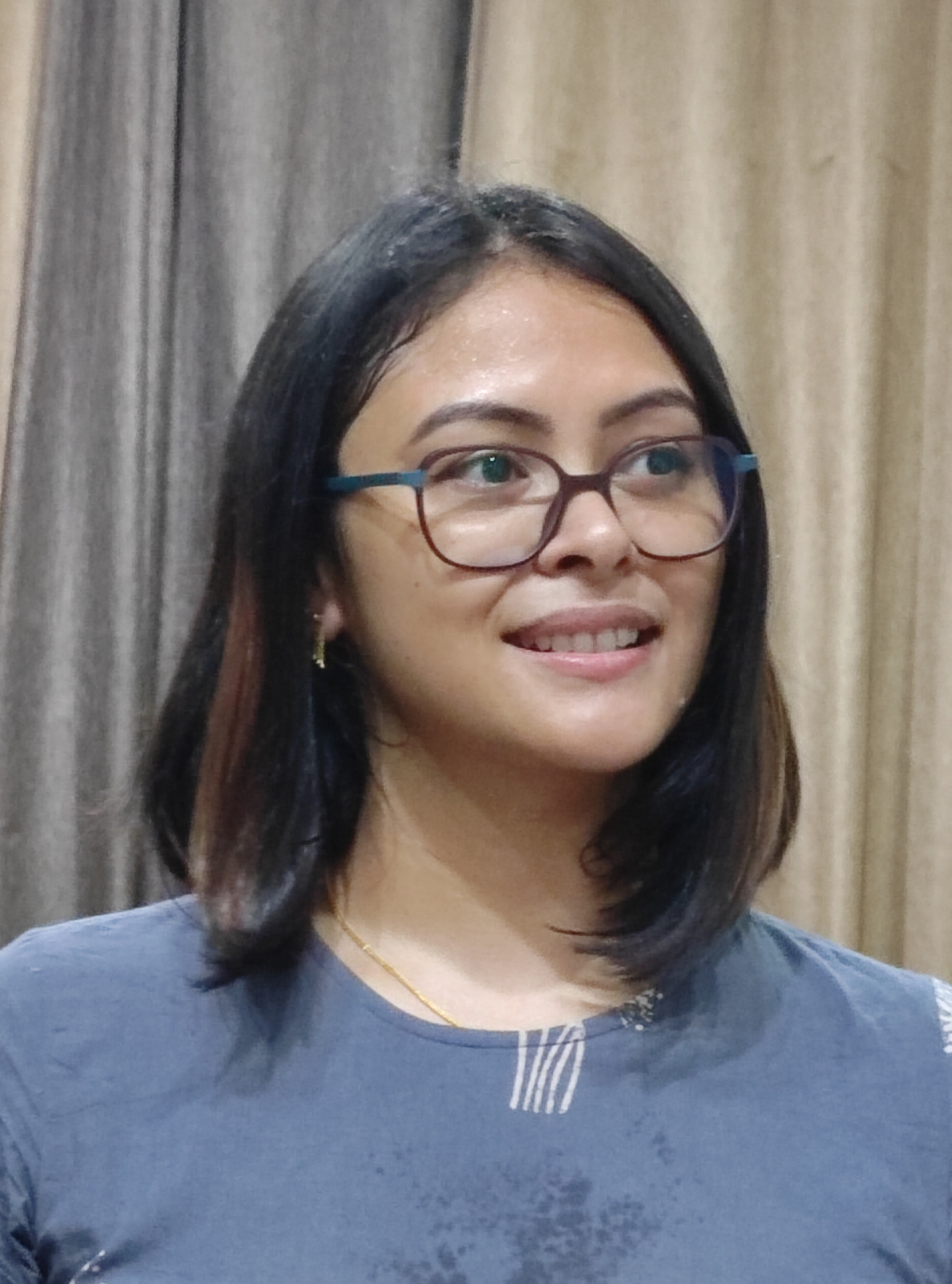
- Maitrayee Patar

Background information
- Born: 7 April 1990 (age 36); Guwahati, Assam
- Genres: Indipop, New-age music, Assamese folk
- Occupations: Writer, singer, lyricist
- Instrument: Vocals
- Years active: 2015-present
- Spouse: Arindam Baruah

Maitrayee Patar (born 7 April 1990) is an Indian writer, poet, and musical artist from Assam. She is known for her contributions to contemporary Assamese literature and for blending Assamese folk traditions with modern and new-age music. A classically trained vocalist, she began her musical career through the independent collective Project Baartalaap, co-founded with musician Shankuraj Konwar.

== Early life and education ==
Patar was born on 7 April 1990 in Guwahati, Assam, India. She belongs to the Tiwa community. At the age of 5, she started formally training for music under her Guru Ranu Baishya. She did her post-graduation in Sociology from the Delhi School of Economics. She also pursued Master of Philosophy in Women's studies from the Tata Institute of Social Sciences, Mumbai.

== Career ==
=== Literature ===
Patar is the author of poetry book Mor Kolmou Dinor Xonali Baat (2015).

She had been selected for Poets Translating Poets 2019 (January) edition, the prestigious cultural exchange workshop of literature of German and Indian languages, hosted by Goethe Institut.

Patar's poetry engages with, describes, or considers the natural world as well as the life of the women. Most of her poems have been translated into other Indian and foreign languages such as Italian, Tiwa, Nepali, Hindi, and Malayalam. She is a regular writer of leading literary magazines Krittibas, Satsori, Prakash, Nebedan and Jatra.

=== Music ===
In 2017, she co-created her debut music album, Project Baartalaap, with Shankuraj Konwar while studying at the Tata Institute of Social Sciences (TISS), Mumbai. The album included the song "Duur Ximonat", which was featured in Rolling Stone Magazine in 2019. Other songs from the album include Baartalaap, Alakananda, Moupiya, Unnaxi, and Awjana.

Patar has performed at several live events and festivals, including the Falcon Festival in Dima Hasao. She has also performed in New Delhi, where her music, sung in Axomiya, was appreciated by audiences regardless of language.

She has collaborated with filmmakers Judhajit Bagchi and Ranadeep Bhattacharya on the song "Nilanjana", featuring Brazilian and Spanish artists Aagatha Figueroa and Julio Padial. She has also worked on musical tributes, including one for poet Nilamani Phukan on his 90th birthday.

== Personal life ==
She married IIT-B alumnus Arindam Baruah in 2020.

== Literary works ==
=== Books ===
- Mor Kalmou Dinor Xonali Baat (Banphool Prakashan, 2015) ISBN 9789381710494 – Assamese
- Dingit Gaza Pani-Mangah (Aank-Baak, 2020) ISBN 9390610273 – Assamese

== Activism ==
Patar along with the writers’ community of Assam demanded the release of Krishak Mukti Sangram Samiti founder Akhil Gogoi, who as of 6 October 2020 lodged in jail for his position within the anti-CAA protest.

== Discography ==
=== Albums ===
Year	Title	Language	Credit	Notes
2020	Baartalaap	Assamese	Shankuraj Konwar and Maitrayee Patar	Debut album of Shankuraj Konwar and Maitrayee Patar.

=== Singles ===
Year	Title	Language	Artist(s)
2020	Alakananda	Assamese	Maitrayee Patar, Shankuraj Konwar, Tonmoy Krypton
2021	Moupiya	Assamese	Shankuraj Konwar, Maitrayee Patar
2021	Gaane Gaane	Assamese	Shankuraj Konwar, Maitrayee Patar
2021	Jakoruwa	Assamese	Shankuraj Konwar, Maitrayee Patar
2021	Unnaxi	Assamese	Tonmoy krypton, Maitrayee Patar
2021	Sesa Ratir Xubaah	Assamese	Pallab Talukdar, Maitrayee Patar, Shankuraj Konwar
2022	Tumar Thikona	Assamese	Maitrayee Patar
2022	Awjana	Assamese	Pallab Talukdar, Maitrayee Patar, Pablu Chetiya
2022	Tumi Nathakileo	Assamese	Maitrayee Patar, Gagan JD, Barsha Borah, Arnab Basistha
2022	O' Ajon	Mising	Maitrayee Patar, Rishan Doley, Jim Ankan Deka
2023	Balimahi	Assamese	Zubeen Garg, Maitrayee Patar
2023	Fagun	Assamese	Arupjyoti Baruah, Maitrayee Patar, Writam Changkakoti
2024	Nogor Pokhi	Assamese	Maitrayee Patar, Pallab Talukdar
2024	Raati Raati Sopune	Assamese	Maitrayee Patar
2024	Moi Tumar	Assamese	Papon, Maitrayee Patar, Pallab Talukdar
2025	Amare Xokhiya	Assamese	Bhupali Mazumdar, Maitrayee Patar
2025	Neel Bhora Kham	Assamese	Mrinmoy Sharma, Maitrayee Patar, Neelakshi Chakraborty
2025	Sayasobi	Assamese	Shankuraj Konwar, Maitrayee Patar
2025	Bhora Nodir Bukut	Assamese	Dr. Utpal Sharma, Maitrayee Patar

== Filmography ==
=== Music Videos ===
Year	Title	Music artist(s)	Director	Cast member(s)	Notes
2025	Lalungoni	Maitrayee Patar, Anupam Konwar, Rupkrishna Patar	Raj Dutta	Maitrayee Patar, Sudipta Dipak Baruah, Tridisha Parashar, Hem Regon, Rupam Das, Daradi Patar	Assamese–Tiwa folk-fusion music video (self-published on YouTube)
