= Mayukh =

Mayukh is an Indian name that may refer to the following notable people:

Given name

- Mayukh Hazarika (born 1971), Indian playback singer and music director
- Mayukh Sen, American biographer and essayist
- Mayukh Singh Mahar (born 1956), Indian politician

Surname

- Sanjay Mayukh, Indian politician
