= Mayukh Hazarika =

- Born: Mayukh Hazarika; 13 January 1971 (age 55); Guwahati, Assam, India
- Genres: Pop, easy listening
- Occupations: Singer, songwriter
- Instruments: Vocals, guitar
- Years active: 1988–present
- Label: Saregama

Mayukh Hazarika (born 13 January 1971) is an Indian playback singer and music director from Assam. He is the frontman of Delhi-based band Mayukh Hazarika and the Brahmaputra Balladeers. He is the son of Assamese musician duo Jayanta Hazarika and Manisha Hazarika, and is the nephew of Bhupen Hazarika.

== Biography ==
=== Early life and education ===
Mayukh Hazarika, also known as Raja, was born in Guwahati, Assam on 13 January 1971, to Assamese singers Jayanta Hazarika and Manisha Hazarika. He is the only son of musician duo. He was only seven years old when he lost his father. His mother taught him to sing from a very early age. Hazarika did his schooling from Kendriya Vidyalaya, Khanapara and later studied at University of Delhi. He completed his post-graduation from AJKMCRC, Jamia Millia Islamia University.

=== Early career ===
After passing out from IIM, Hazarika joined as Head of Camera at NDTV Lifestyle in 2007. Simultaneously, he was performing as a singer at various concerts in India and all around the world along with his wife and singer Laili Dutta Hazarika and mother Manisha Hazarika.

=== Music career ===
He shot into fame with his album 'Sokue Jodi Kotha Koy' which was released on 5 February 2009 and was promoted by Bharti Airtel. Before this he had been engaged in singing cover versions of Jayanta Hazarika and Bhupen Hazarika's hit songs. Although Hazarika embodies his father's cherubic voice, he has skillfully managed to create his own signature style over time.

== Personal life ==
Hazarika lives in Bombay with his wife Laili Dutta Hazarika and daughter Ahiri. His father, noted Assamese singer and music director Jayanta Hazarika, died on 15 October 1977 in Kolkata at the age of 34.

== Discography ==
- Shilongare Godhuli (2002)
- Sokue Jodi Kotha Koy (2009)
- Monor Maram (2012)
- Assamese Modern Songs (2012)
- All Time Greats Jayanta Hazarika (2012)
- Anuradha (2012)
- Assomor Chirajugamiya Geet (2012)

== Singles ==
- "Sokuye Jodi Kotha Koi" (music: Aniruddha Barua) (2009)
- "Niyoror Xur" (music: Jim Ankan Deka) (2019)

== See also ==
- Music of Assam
- Jayanta Hazarika
- Bhupen Hazarika
- Zubeen Garg
- Angaraag Mahanta
