= Mising people =

Indigenous community in northeast India

Mising
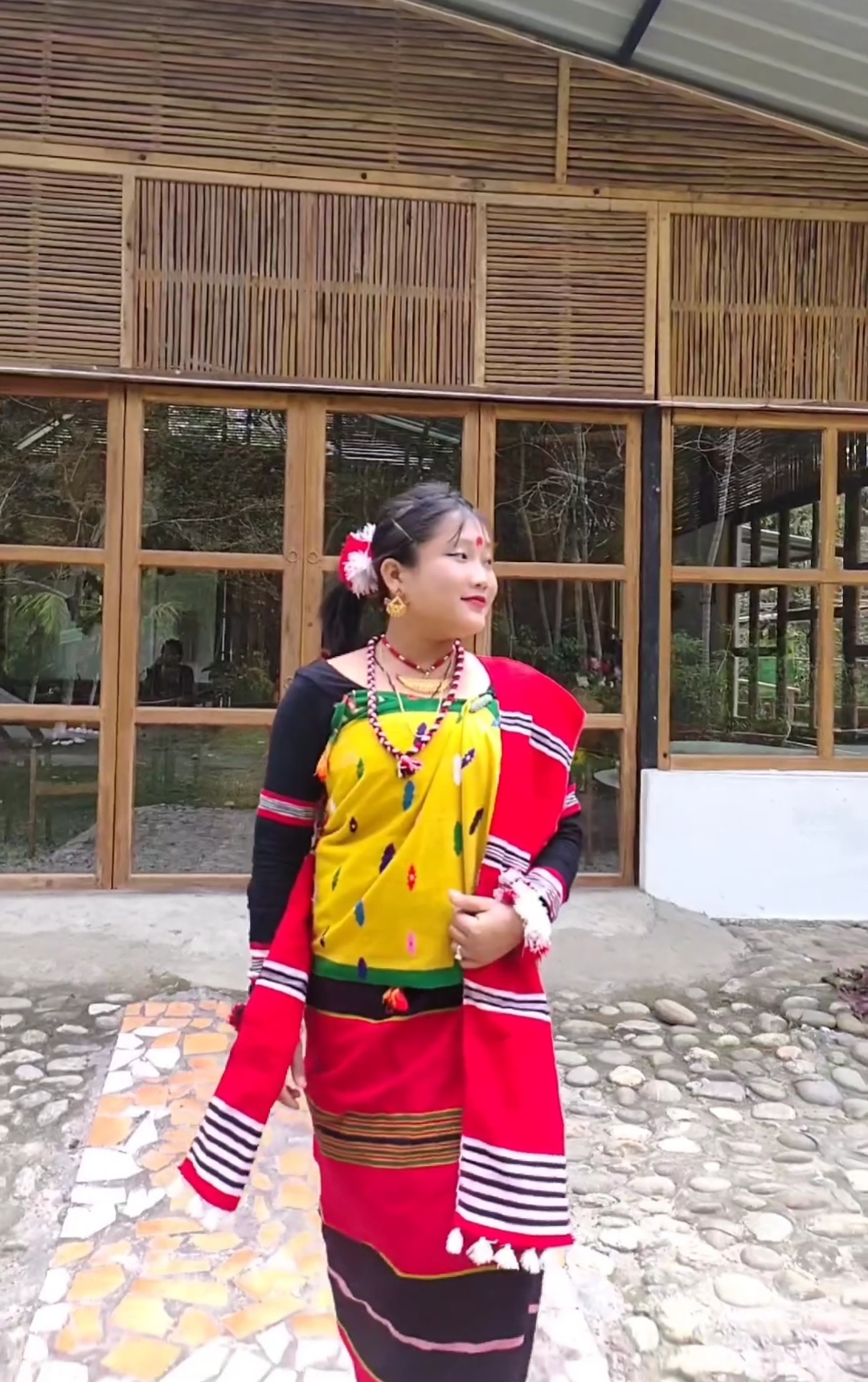
- Mising woman in traditional attire

Total population
- 603,310 (2001 census)

Regions with significant populations
- India
- Assam: 587,310
- Arunachal Pradesh: 16,000

Languages
- Mising, Tani

Religion
- Hinduism, Christianity, Donyi-Polo

Related ethnic groups
- Adi, Apatani, Galo, Hill Miri, Nyishi, Tagin, Lhoba people, Tibetans

The Mising people or Miri people (/ˈmiːsɪŋ/ or /ˈmɪsɪŋ/) are a Tibeto-Burman ethnic group living mostly in the Northeast Indian states of Assam and Arunachal Pradesh. Their Mising language is a part of the Tani languages and the Tibeto-Burman language group. The Misings are a major ethnic group of Assam, and the second largest tribe after the Bodos. 15.4% of Assam's tribal population speaks Mising, but many more speak Assamese (24.7%) and Mising organisations estimate that the unofficial Mising population is more than 1.2 million, as of 2012, rather than the 587,310 declared by the 2001 census of India.

== Etymology ==
The Misings are officially listed as Miri in the Constitution of India's order of Scheduled Tribes, but they prefer the term Mising. Mising is an endonym and demonym which literally means 'man of the soil'. Miri, on the other hand, is an exonym once applied by the Assamese. There is still much scholarly debate on the origin of Miri as an ethnonym. The Misings also use the endonym Tani, 'man', for identifying themselves.

Some British ethnographers argued that miri referred to a status as intermediaries between plains people in the Brahmaputra Valley and hill tribes towards the north in Arunachal Pradesh. Another theory — Bhandari (1984) — associates miri with being religious functionaries of Tani hill-tribes. When some ritualists migrated to the plains they were identified as coming from the Miri pahar ('Miri hills'), whose feats of magic would have been well-known back then, and the name stuck. However, this exonymic ethnonym was perhaps not used to designate the entire community of Tani language speakers. Nevertheless, the exonym became widespread and for the non-Miri people living in the plains, the Mising eventually became known as the Miri.

== History ==
=== Early history ===
The Misings were an oral community until the early 20th century. Accordingly, there are no detailed written records of the people in their earliest habitat and culture. Some Assamese literature from the Vaishnavite period, and the Ahom Chronicles, the Buranji's, mention the Miri's (Misings) in relation to their interactions with Vaishnavite saints and Ahom kings. The ethnonym Miri was used by the Ahoms to designate many communities inhabiting the hills of the north-east region between the gorge of the Subansiri River and the Siyang River in Arunachal Pradesh. The British also left behind accounts about the Misings, starting in the 19th century. These sporadic accounts form the basis of attempts to reconstruct early Mising history.

According to Sharma, the Misings are related to the Tani speakers of present-day Arunachal Pradesh. Their original habitat may have been the hills of Arunachal Pradesh from whence they migrated to the plains. The Misings may have entered present-day Assam around the 13th-14th century during the reign of Chutia kings in search of fertile lands. This migration continued, gradually, for centuries, and today, the Mising population is concentrated around the districts of Dhemaji, Lakhimpur, and Majuli.

There is no written history about Misings migrating to the plains of the Brahmaputra Valley, but history was passed down orally in the form of folk songs and stories by their ancestors from generation to generation and is still prevalent among their society. Although they were initially hill-dwellers, they later migrated to the plains in search of fertile land and started living on the northern banks of the Brahmaputra. One account by a British ethnographer suggests they migrated due to conflicts with the Abor or Adi peoples. Another tradition suggests they settled under the patronage of an Ahom king. While it is not known precisely when they were settled in the plains, many Mising peoples had already settled in the region before the British annexation of Upper Assam in 1838–39.

According to Bhandari, the Misings have social and cultural differences between themselves. Bhandari argues that these differences might originate in different waves of migrations, which led to some differences between kinship groups, namely, the Barogan and the Dohgam, meaning 'twelve-chiefs' and 'ten-chiefs'. Some Dohgam Mising clans have traditions indicating that they migrated to the plains as late as, or later than, 1826, when the East India Company had annexed most of the Ahom Kingdom. In contrast to Bhandhari, Lakshmi Devi states that the distinction between the Barogan and the Dohgam are based on Assamese tradition, and devoid of "any structural or other importance" for understanding the Miri or Mising peoples. Devi advocates an interpretation in which the Miri's are generally divided between "Plain Miri's" and the "Hill Miri's".

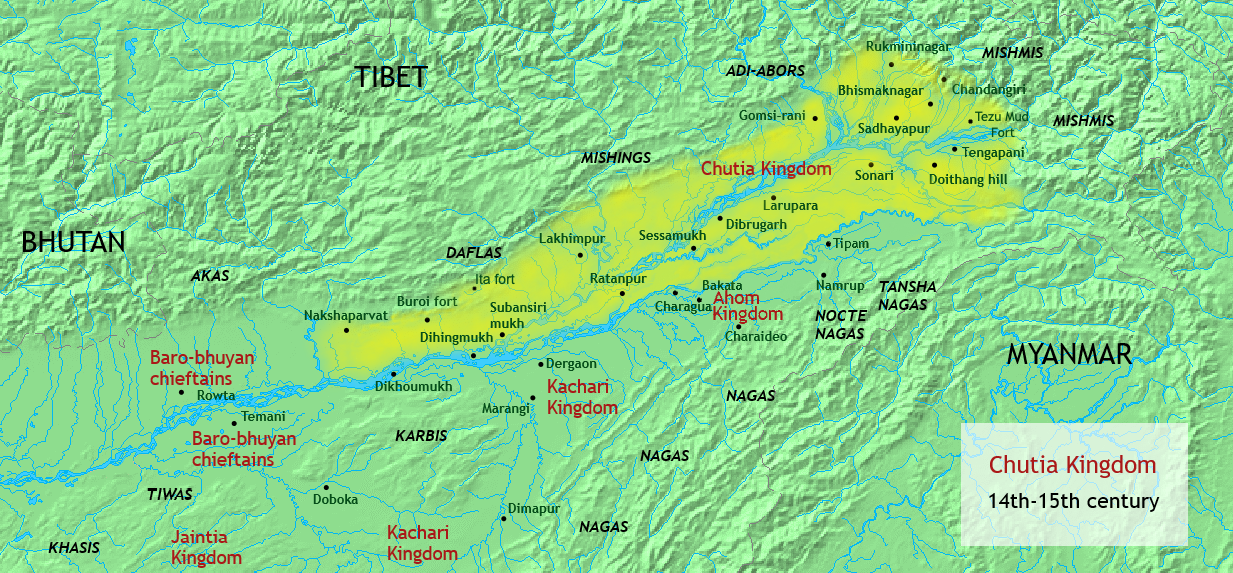
Map of Chutia kingdom showing the hills near the Suvansiri river, where from the Mishing people first descended onto the plains.

The historical Miri’s inhabiting the plains of the Chutia Kingdom were designated as the "Chutia Miri" by the Ahoms during the reign of Suhungmung, the Dihingia Raja. These Miri’s included those who were serving as Hatigahis (suppliers of grass for royal elephants) to the Chutia king's war elephants, and came under the overlordship of the Ahoms, who allowed them to reside in their vilages in return for annual tribute.

Some historical Miri’s living near Sadiya not infrequently raided Ahom territory. In 1615, the Miri attacked Ahom territory during the reign of Susenghphaa, 'Pratap Singha', and the force sent to subdue them failed. The Miri's of Sadiya were conciliated by their enrolment in the ‘’posa’’ system of trade relations. The hill-tribes on the frontiers of the Brahmaputra Valley were deficient in labourers and raw materials, and committed raids on the fertile plains to alleviate these deficiencies. However, the Ahoms had granted these Hill Miri's — who also cultivated the advanced tracts of Bordoloni, Sisi, and Dhemaji — the rights to participate in the "posa" system through which they could address their needs under mediation of Ahom commercial structures.

In 1655, however, the Miri's of Sadiya launched another raid, which resulted in a successful counter-raid by Ahom forces during which the Miri's were defeated. They agreed to pay an annual tribute of wild cows, horses, twenty tortoises, yellow pebbles, woven blankets, and Shikaradao, a type of knife. They were placed under the governorship of the Sadiyakhowa Gohain and a new officer called Miri Barau was appointed as a subordinate to the Gohain. An officer called the Barbarua presided over the Miri's of Sadiya in matters relating to warfare and other important royal concerns. The Barbarua was ordered to employ these Miri's as kanri within the Paik system.

In 1665, during the reign of Supangmung, 'Chakradhwaj Singha', the Miri's of Sadiya rebelled and refused to come to terms with the Ahoms. The construction of earthen rampart fortifications by Supatphaa, 'Gadadhar Singha', halted the Miri raids. It was only by 1685 that these Miri's were fully subjugated by the Ahoms. Despite tense relations, the Miri's were given positions in the Ahom army and administration throughout the 17th century. The Miri's served in the Ahom army of Sutamla, 'Jayadhwaj Singha', Supatphaa, or 'Gadadhar Singha', and Sukhrungpha, or 'Rudra Singha', the last of whom campaigned against the Kachari and Jaintia kingdoms at the turn of the 18th century.

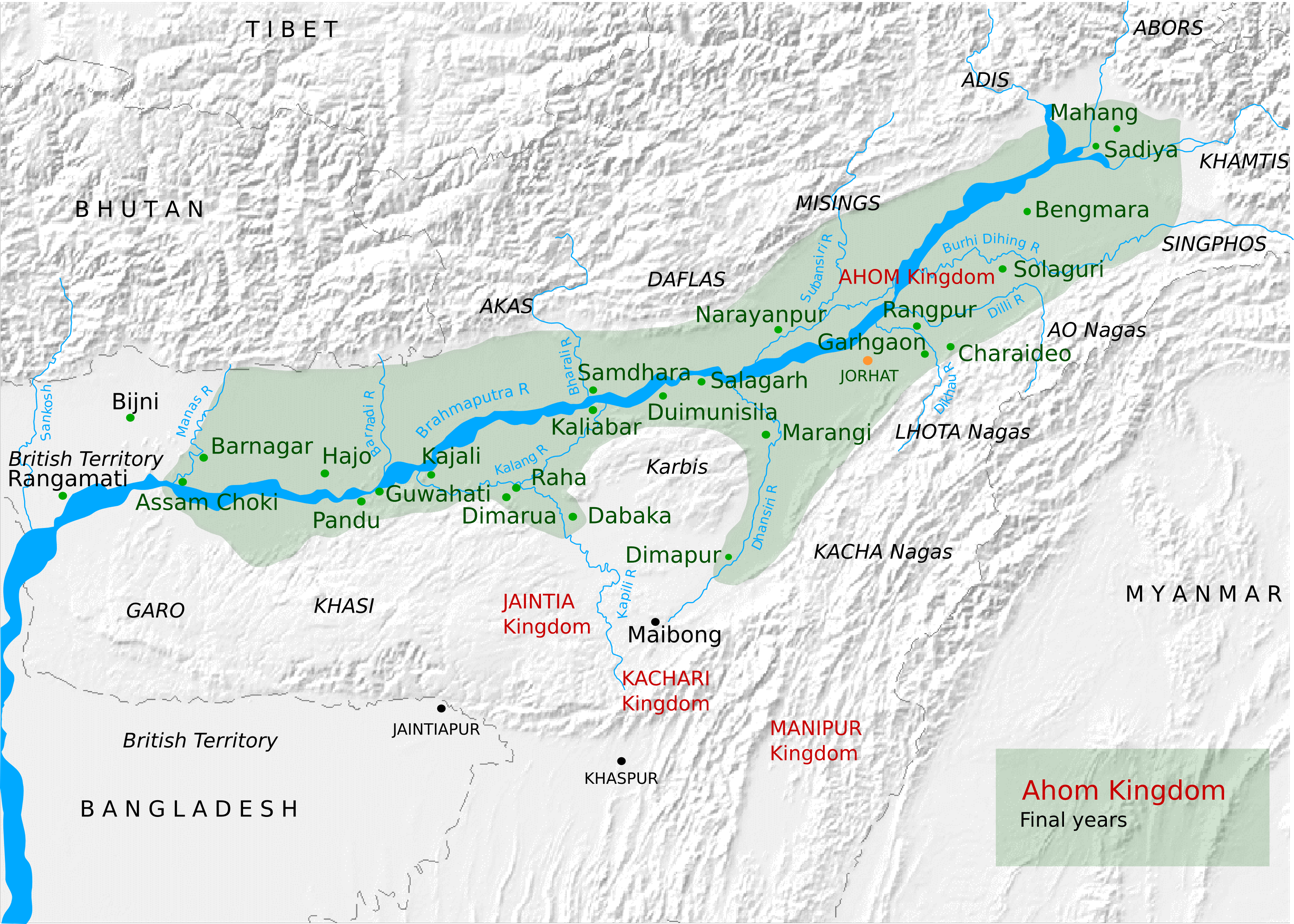
A map of the Ahom kingdom in 1826, with Mising people placed on the frontiers of the north bank of the Brahmaputra Valley near the Subansari River

By the beginning of the 18th century, the Miri's of Sadiya were fully pacified and conciliated with the Ahom kingdom. During the Moamaria rebellion, the Miri's remained loyal despite many other hill-tribes raiding Ahom territory during the period of chaos and confusion. The Ahom kings encouraged Ahomisation. In the reign of Suhungmung, the Dihingia Raja, a Miri man was ennobled by the Ahom court and raised to a high-rank. A Miri child was adopted by the Bhokola Gohain, a member of the Borgohain family, and received the name "Miri-Sandikai", and his descendants came to be known as the "Miri-Sandikai" family. It was a descendant of this "Miri-Sandikai" family that was made governor of Sadiya during the reign of Supatphaa or Gadadhar Singha.

The Miri's were well-conciliated with the early British colonial regime that succeeded the Ahom kingdom, in part, because the British retained aspects of the "posa" trade system introduced by the Ahoms. During the British period, colonial administrators persuaded the Hill Miri's to commute their claims in return for a fixed monthly payment.

=== 20th Century ===
Beginning in the 20th century, modern education spread amongst the Misings through Christian missionaries. This led to the development of an educated class that pursued socio-economic advancement and political rights during the colonial period. In 1924, Mising leaders in the Brahmaputra Valley gathered under the banner of the Sadou Asam Miri Sanmilan (All Assam Miri Conference). The Sanmilan was the precursor to the Mising Bane Kebang (Mising National Congress). The Kebang emerged as the vehicle for the educated Misings, raising its voice for employment and political power for Misings. Although opportunities were limited, some Misings gained colonial era jobs as revenue officials and school teachers, which formed the nascent Mising middle class. However, this educated class felt marginalised and suppressed by the non-tribal Assamese speakers, especially those who followed the Hindu caste system. The Misings were amongst the tribal peoples in Assam who actively competed with the non-tribal Assamese, who saw any assertion of socio-economic and political rights by tribal leaders with mistrust and suspicion.

In 1932, the Bodo, Mising, and other tribes formed the Tribal League, with the view of advocating for their political rights and socio-economic advancement. The Tribal League secured five seats reserved for the tribal population in the Assam Legislative Council election in 1935, with Karko Ch. Doley as the Mising representative. However, the League became engulfed in inter-personal competition, and many leaders joined the Indian National Congress after the independence of India in 1947. Although an important part of the independence movement in Assam, the tribal leaders did not feel recognised, and became alienated from the non-tribal Assamese caste Hindu dominated Congress which advocated assimilation policies towards the tribals.

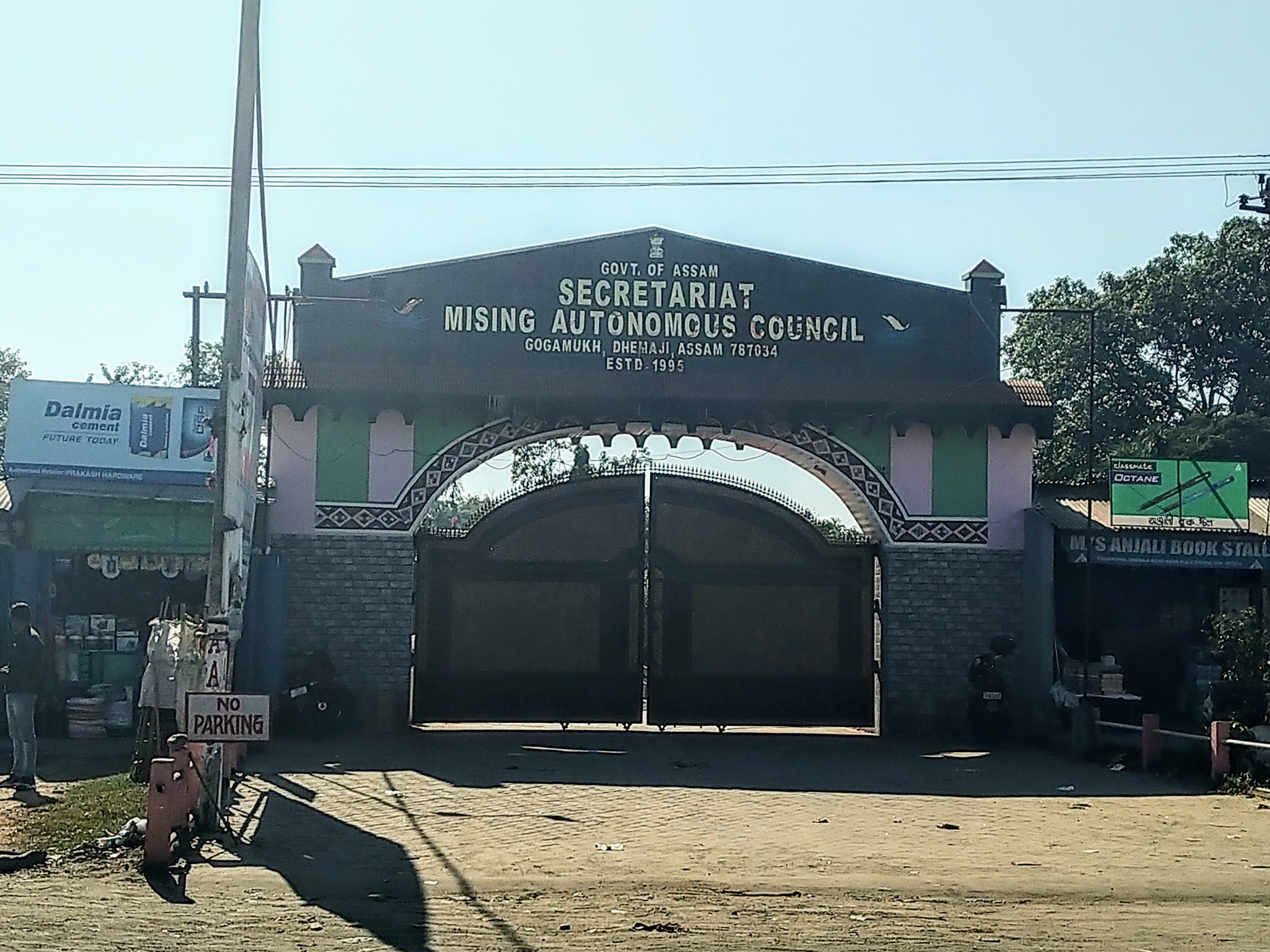
Entrance of Mising Autonomous Council, Gogamukh, Dhemaji, Assam

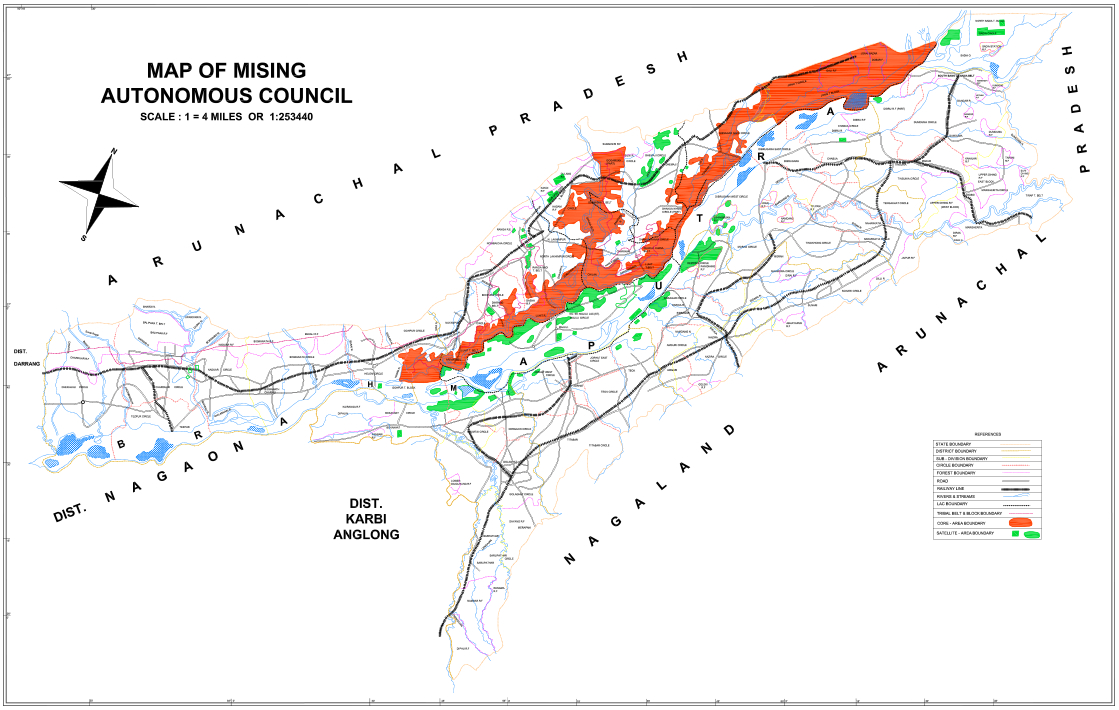
Map of Mising Autonomous Council, with core areas in orange and satellite areas in green

Dissatisfaction with the Indian National Congress led to the development of organisations that prioritised Mising political and socio-economic interests, including the North East Frontier Miri-Abor Sanmilan formed in 1947 and led by Padmeswar Doley. The Sanmilan adopted a resolution for autonomy of the Misings, Adis, and Nyishis on the eastern part of the north bank of the Brahamaputra Valley. In 1951 and 1959, further Mising organisations were formed, which, in 1974, were merged and renamed Assam Arunachal Misings Studions Union. In 1978, a resolution was adopted to change the name to All Assam Mising Students Union. From 1972 to 1980, there was a debate on a suitable script for the Mising language, wherein the Assamese alphabet was permanently displaced by a preference for the Roman alphabet. In 1982, a unanimous resolution was passed demanding autonomy for Misings under the Sixth Schedule of the Constitution. In 1985, the name of All Assam Mising Students Union was changed to Takam Mising Porin Kebang, or, All Mising Students Union, which launched a movement for autonomy. Another autonomist movement was directed through the Plain Tribals Council of Assam (PTCA), which, in 1973, started demanding a separate Union territory called Udayanchal or Mising-Bodoland for tribals along the northern bank of the Brahmaputra Valley. However, this proposal was not successful in Bodoland nor in Mising inhabited parts of Assam.

The Misings currently have some state autonomy under Mising Autonomous Council (MAC), which was formed in 1995 following popular agitations for greater autonomy. MAC includes 40 constituencies in eight upper Assam districts comprising core areas and satellite areas. Core areas denote territorially compact and contiguous regions predominantly inhabited by Misings, where they comprise half or more than half of the overall population locally, rather than necessarily in individual villages. Satellite areas denote territorially non-contiguous regions primarily inhabited by Misings, where they comprise half or more of the total in the cluster, rather than necessarily in individual villages. Executive Councillor from 36 constituencies are elected democratically while 4 other members are elected through the state government. Ethnic tensions have occurred in the MAC area between the Misings and other communities.

== Politics ==
Mising politics are centred on three levels, the Mising Autonomous Council (MAC), the Assam Legislative Assembly, and the Lok Sabha, the lower house of the Indian Parliament. The Misings have a decisive electoral vote in Lakhimpur Lok Sabha constituency. In the legislative assembly, the Misings have a decisive electoral vote in Upper Assam, where they are the largest tribal community. The Takam Mising Porin Kebang (TMPK) is the major Mising centric student union, and the Sanmilita Gana Shakti (SGS) is the TMPK's political vehicle in electoral politics. The Misings who support local parties often ally with national parties, hoping that such associations would further their own political aspirations. In 2009, the MAC was headed by a coalition of the Indian National Congress and the SGS. In 2013, the SGS won a majority of seats, and subsequently refuted reports that the Indian National Congress supported the party in the autonomous council elections in return for support during the 2014 Indian general election. The SGS subsequently entered the National Democratic Alliance led by the Bharatiya Janata Party. After the 2019 elections, the MAC has been headed by a coalition of the SGS and the Bharatiya Janata Party. The next MAC elections due in 2024 were postponed, first until 2025, and then again until after the 2026 assembly elections.

== Population ==
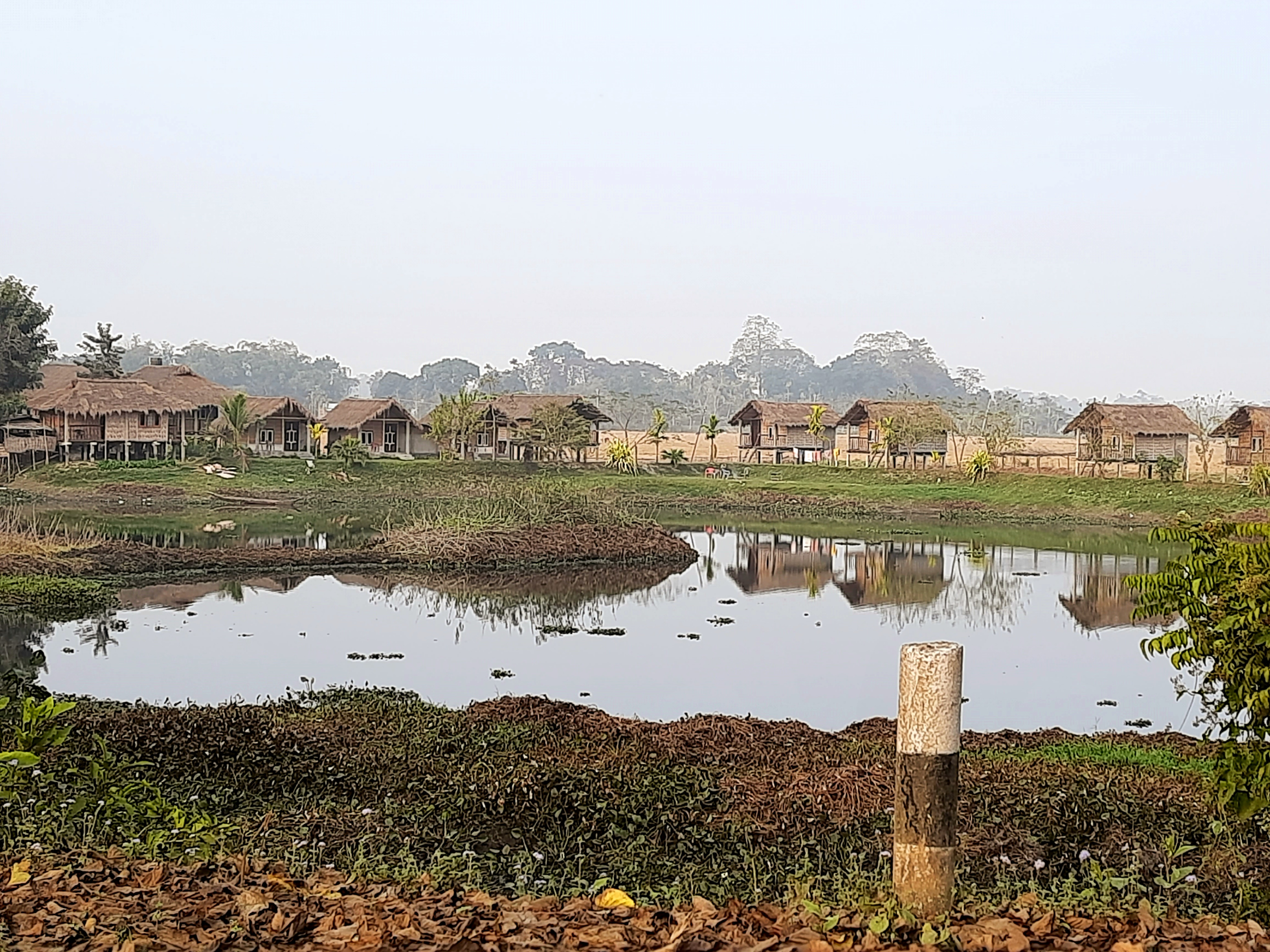
Mising traditional houses, Majuli

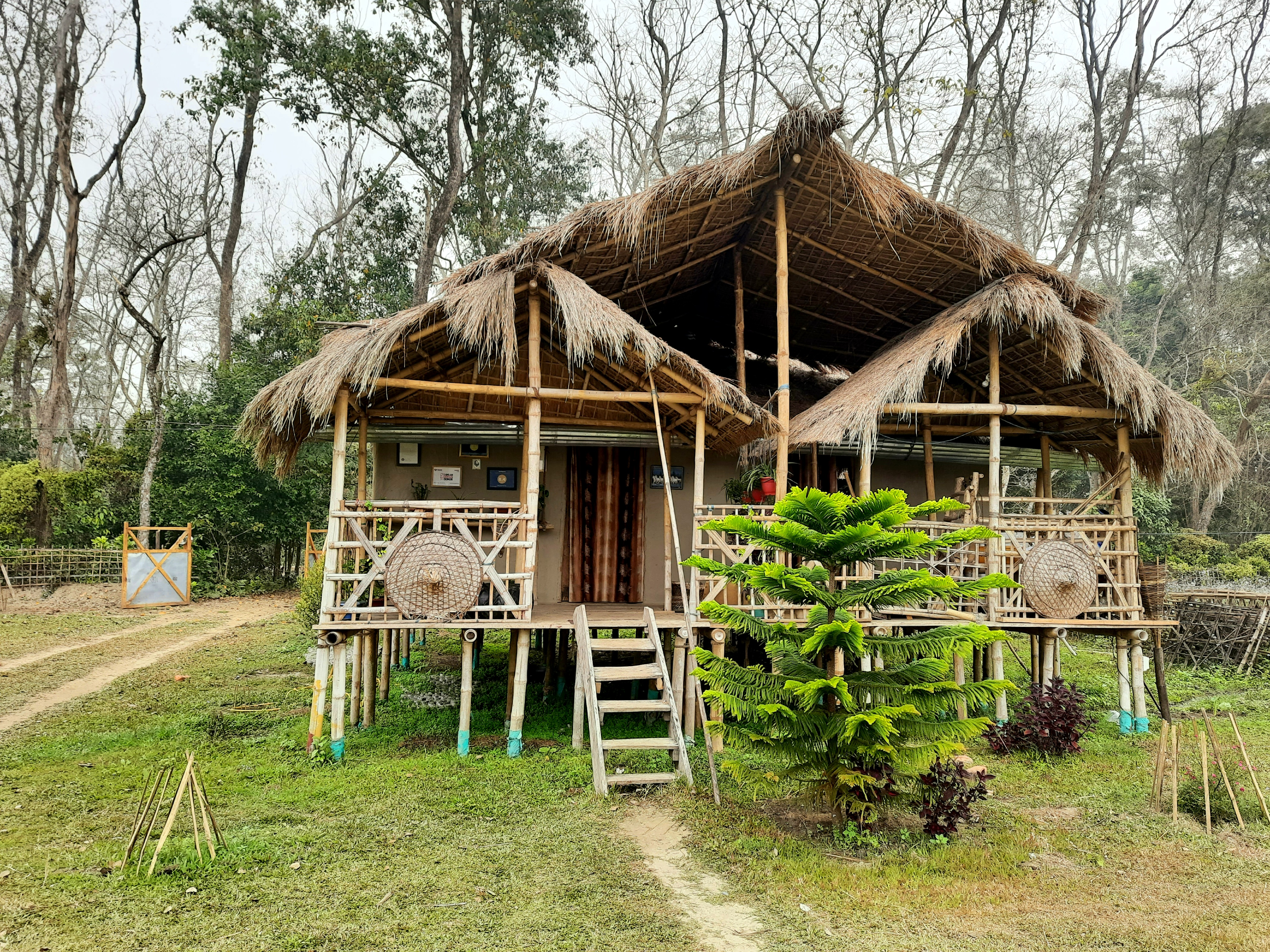
Mising traditional house, Majuli

According to the 2001 census, the Mising population of Assam is 587,310. According to Mising organisations, their actual population in 2012 is more than 1.2 million. They live in 10 districts of Assam: Dhemaji, Lakhimpur, Sonitpur, Tinsukia, Dibrugarh, Sivasagar, Majuli, Charaideo, Jorhat and Golaghat, with most of the population concentrated in Dhemaji, Lakhimpur, and Majuli. There are 16,000 Misings in three districts of Arunachal Pradesh: East Siang district, Lower Dibang Valley, and Lohit.

== Education ==
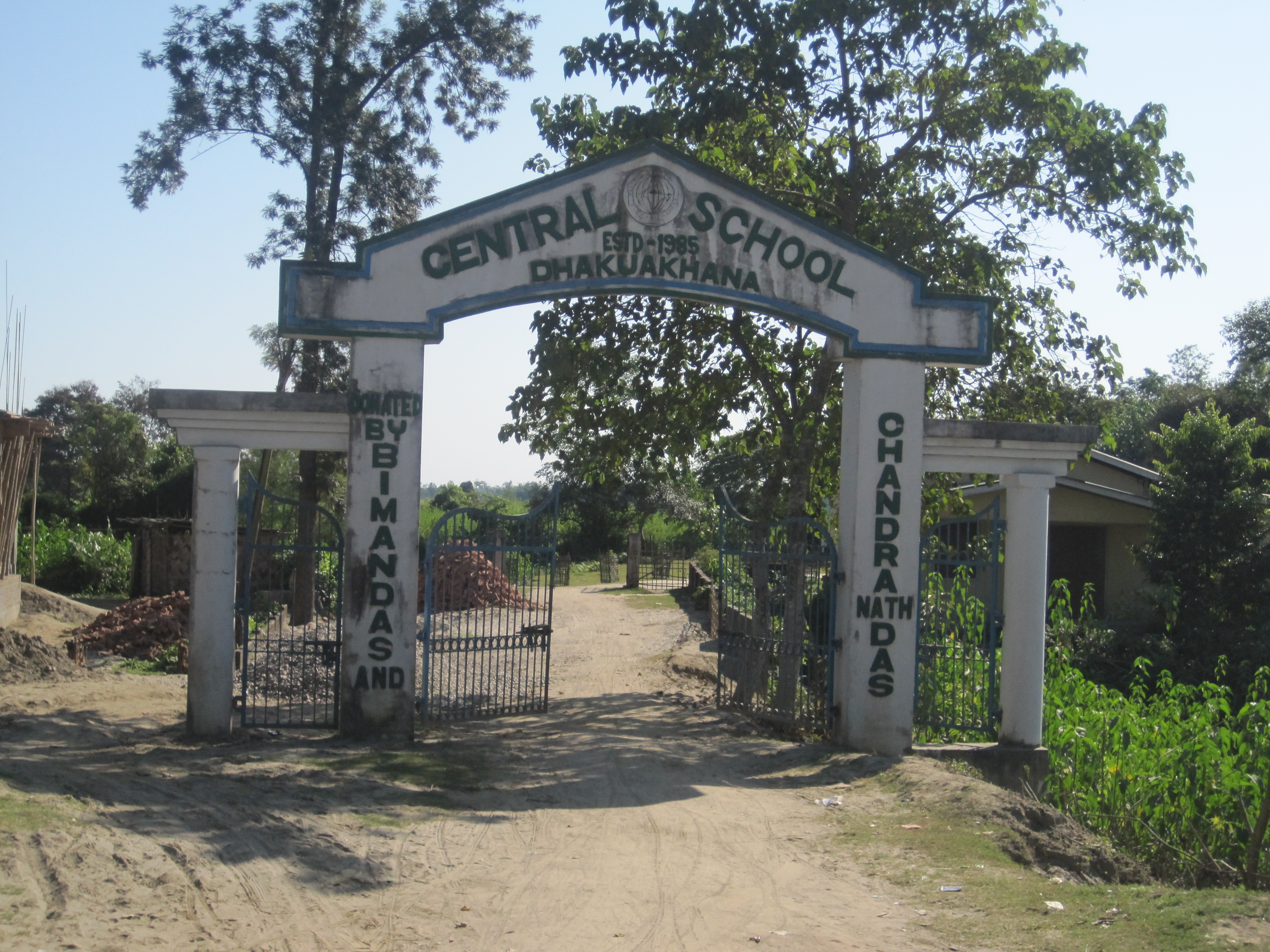
Dhakuakhana Central School

Modern education began with the advent of Christian missionary activity in the late 19th century. Christian missionaries wrote the Mising language in the Roman alphabet. In 1885, J. E. Needham prepared a grammar based on Shaiyang Miri language prevalent around Sadiya. In 1907, J. H. Lorrain completed a Miri-Abor dictionary. In 1926, the first Mising graduate completed a Bachelor of Arts degree from Calcutta University. The literacy rate is 60.1% (Male 71.4%, Female 48.3%), which remains below the state figure of Scheduled Tribe literacy of 62.5%, as of 2012. There is widespread disparity in educational attainment amongst the relatively disadvantaged sections of Mising society.

== Language ==
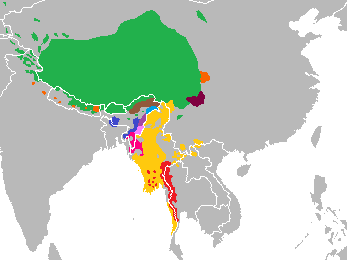
Mising, a Tani language, which is coloured brown in this map of Tibeto-Burman languages

Educated Misings are bilingual in Assamese and Mising, but some speak only Assamese and a minority speak only Mising. The Misings practice code switching, depending on the degree of their interactions with the non-tribal Assamese, the dominant community in the Brahmaputra Valley.

== Religion ==
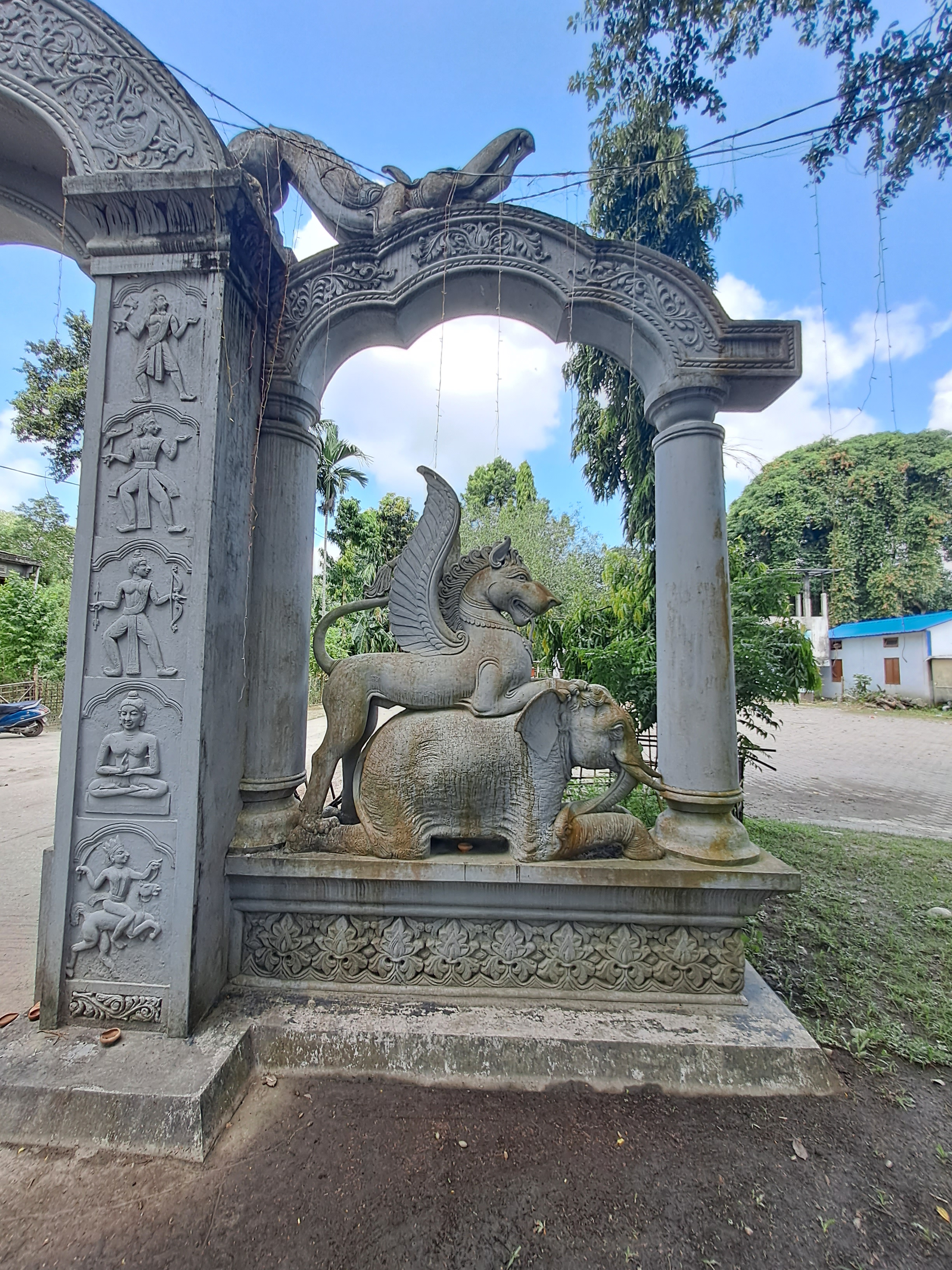
Entrance of Garamur xatra, Majuli

The neo-Vaishnavite cult of Sankardev had a significant influence on the Mising people, and stimulated a process of Sanskritisation. There are many neo-Vaishnavite monasteries, or xatras, in the Mising populated areas of Assam. However, the Misings later perceived that the xatras had become instruments perpetuating the interest of non-tribal Assamese speaking elites, which led to the weakening of neo-Vaishnavism by the 1970s. Although the Misings are reckoned amongst the Hinduized peoples, they have retained many of their customary practices. This is in contrast to other Hinduized tribal groups in Assam, which have relinquished many of their traditional customs and embraced the Assamese caste Hindu system.

A new identity-centric cultural movement called Donyi-Polo has gained some following among the Mising people, with a point of origin in Arunachal Pradesh, where it has a wider following. Christianity has been embraced by some of the Mising population, which has led to some sectarian tensions.

== Economy ==
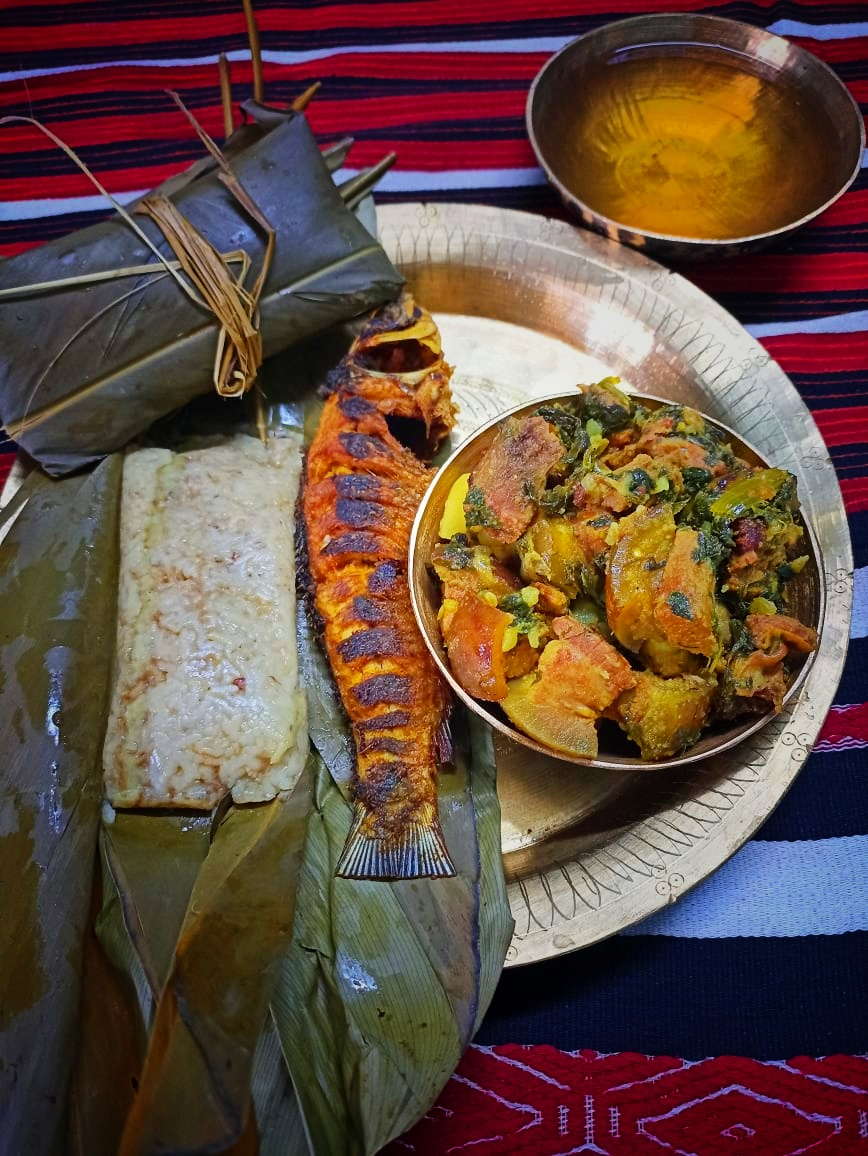
A traditional Mising thali

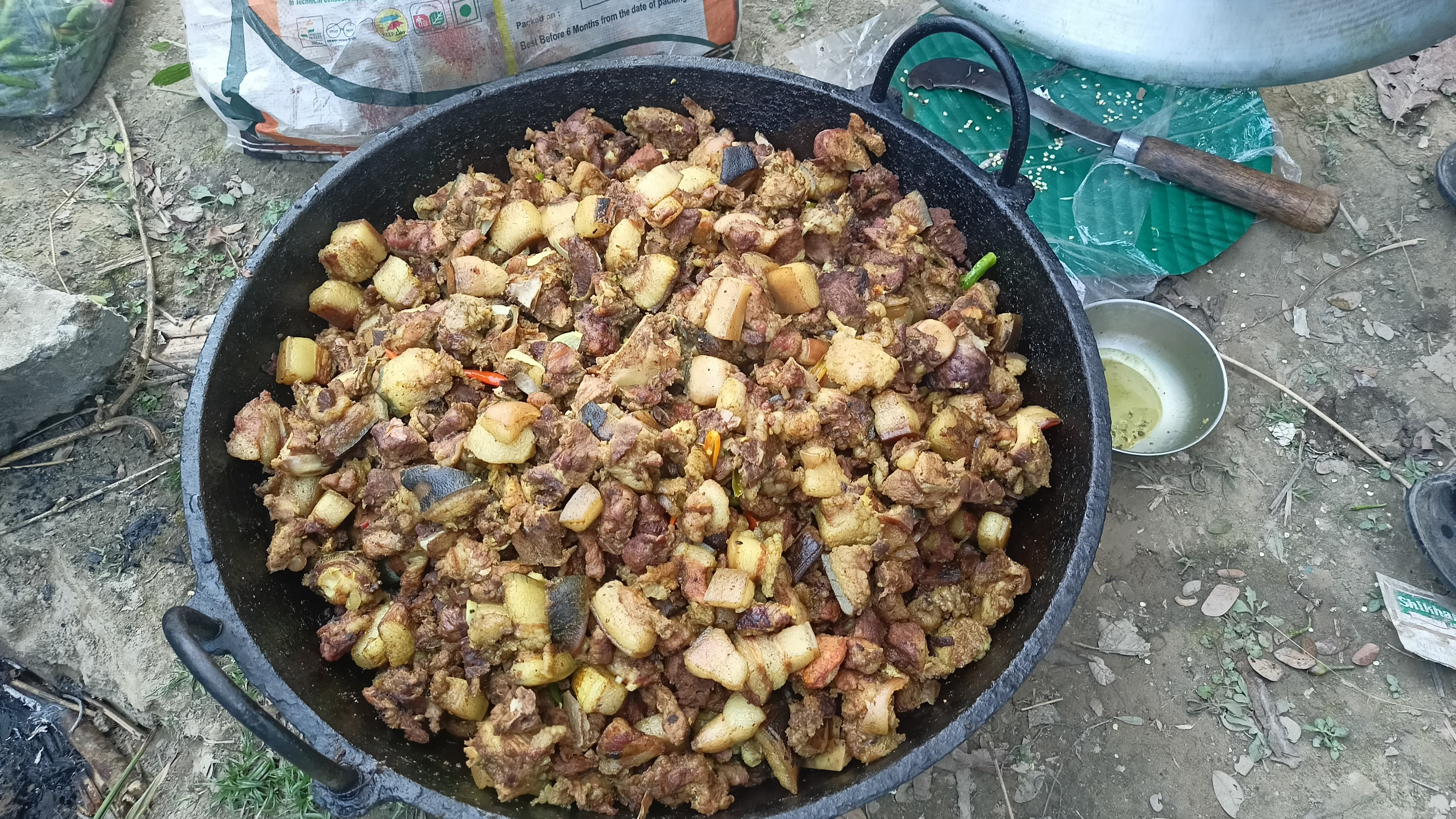
Pork is an important foodstuff for Mising people

Agriculture and animal husbandry constitute the main sources of income for Misings, who have a consumption-oriented, subsistence economy. Commercialisation is at a very low stage of development. The Misings practiced slash and burn agriculture until recently. Today, they are a "settled peasant" society like many other peoples in Assam. The Misings practice mono-cropping, including cultivation of rice and Rabi crops such as potatoes and mustard. Being a riverine people, the Misings face the danger of the surging floods of the Brahmaputra River and its tributaries. Their habitat is acutely affected by the high incidence of soil erosion caused by the floodwater. These phenomena have resulted in the rapid alienation of land — both agricultural and habitable — among the Misings, thereby constituting disadvantages to their socio-economic standing. The construction of dams upstream the north bank of the Brahmaputra in Arunachal Pradesh is one of the issues facing the Mising people. Many agriculturalists have now become daily wage earners after migrating to distant towns and cities, especially Dibrugarh. A number of Mising youths have migrated out of Assam and are employed in various states of India.

== Culture ==
Dance and Music

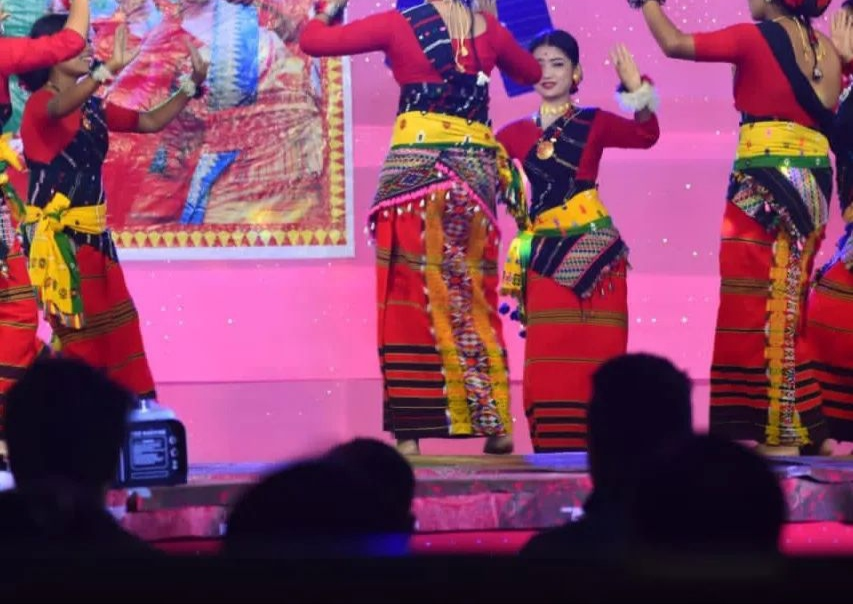
Mising women performing gumrag dance

The Misings have a variety of different types of folk songs

- A:bang – It is a verse of hymn of praise and worship of gods and goddesses. A:bang is sung by the Mibu (priest) at rituals. There is also community A:bangs generally used in Pobua or Porag, a ritual festival, praying for better crops, health and happiness.
- Kaban – It is one of the oldest forms of Mising folk songs. It is lamentational music.
- Tebo Tekang – It is a romantic lyric.
- Siuhung Nitom – It is a melancholic song.
- Bini – These are lullabies sung either at home or in the field when taking babies to places of work. The baby is tied to the back of the mother or the young babysitter.
- Midang Nitom – This is usually sung at the time of ushering a bride to her new home, often in order to tease her.
- Oi Nitom – It is the most popular form of Mising folk song, sung by Mising youths when they are working or moving about the fields, woods, etc. It is a part of the Mising Soman (dance).

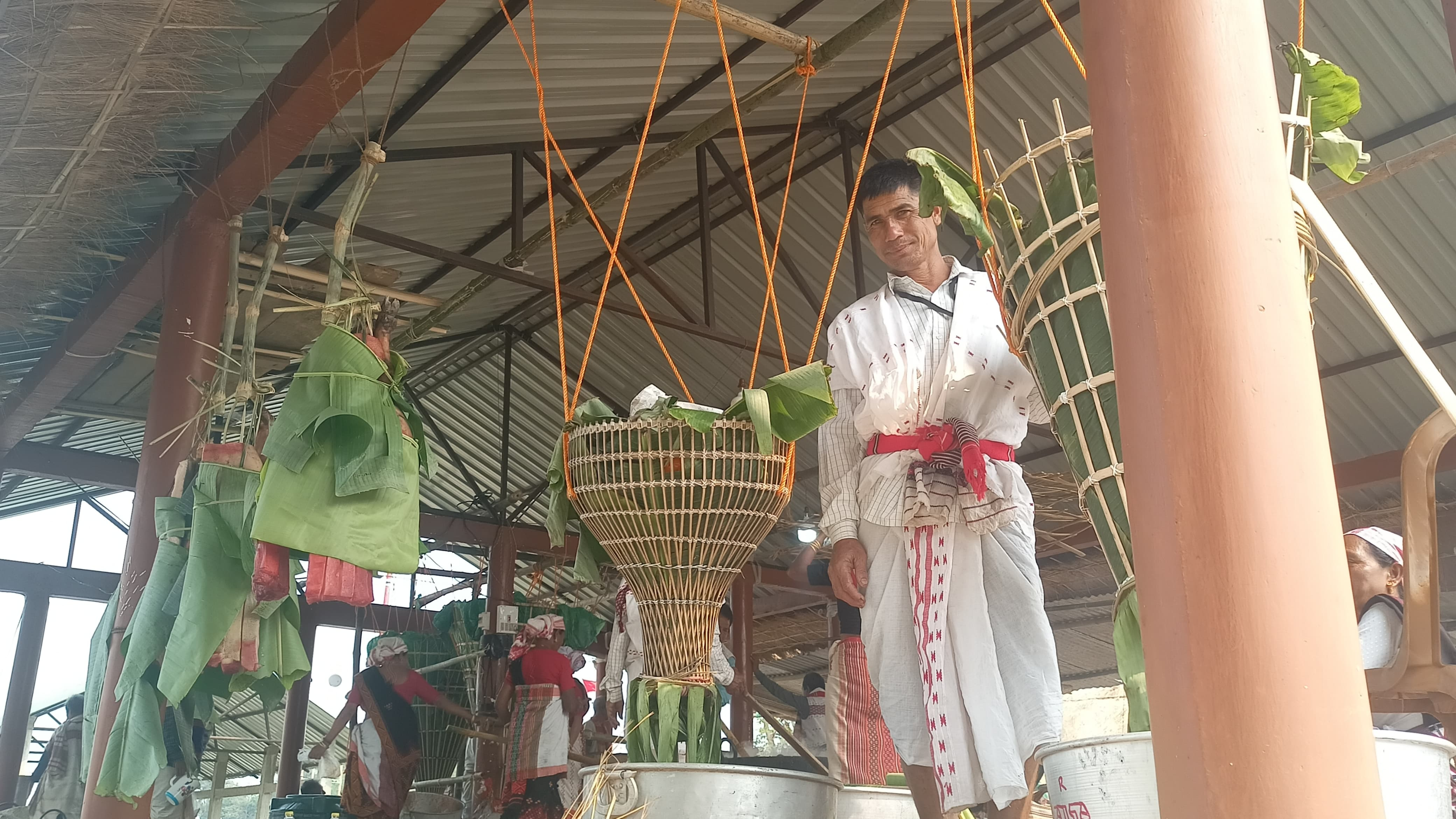
Porag celebration

There are many types of Mising dances, and each has its particular rules. Gumrag is performed five times in circles. Drums and cymbals are the usual musical instruments for the dances

- Mibu Dagnam – It is a dance performed mostly during Po:rag, the harvesting festival, observed in the Murong, the community hall of the Misings. The priest sings the Ahbang while performing this ritual dance.
- Selloi – Song and dance often performed for fun with the accompaniment of drums or cymbals. It marks the beginning of the influx of the Mising people from hills to plains of Assam.
- Lereli – Occasionally, all sections of Mising people indulge in singing and dancing lereli in sheer fun and merriment, especially at meeting old friends.
- Ejug Tapung Soman – This is a very ancient form of dance performed to the accompaniment of ejug tapung, a wind instrument resembling the snake charmer's been.
- Gumrag Soman (Gumrag Paksong) – This dance is performed on the occasion of Ali-Aye-Ligang.
- Lotta Soman – This dance is performed on any occasion, as an expression of joy or community celebration.

Festivals

Mising people celebrate various festivals, though, the two chief traditional festivals of the Misings are the Ali Aye Ligang, and the Po:rag, both connected with their agricultural cycle.

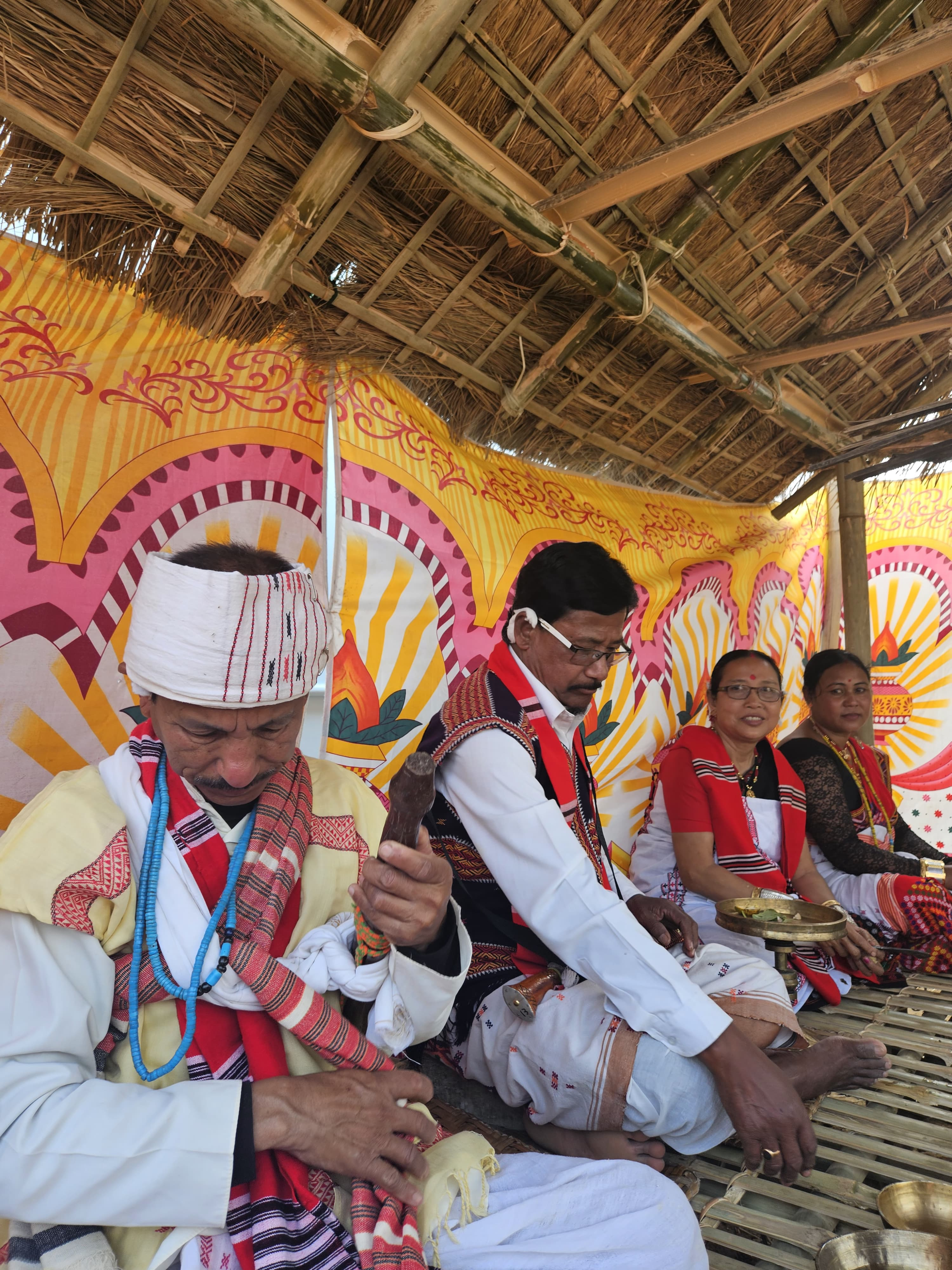
Mising people celebrating Ali-Aye-Ligang

Ali-Ayé-Lígang is a festival marking the beginning of the sowing season, and marks the start of a new agricultural calendar. Ali-Ayé means seeds in a row, and Lígang means sowing of seeds. Ali-Ayé-Lígang starts on the first Wednesday of February, considered an auspicious day, and lasts for five days. Ali-Ayé-Lígang is a five-day festival. The celebrations begin with the heads of families sowing ceremonially rice paddy seeds in a corner of their respective rice fields in the morning hours and praying for crop abundance. Young men and women participate in the occasion by singing and dancing at night in the courtyard of every household in the villages to the accompaniment of drums, cymbals, and a gong. The gong is not used on any festive occasion other than the Ali-Ayé Lígang. Similarly, the drums have specific beats for this festival. The troupe accepts from each household offers of rice beer and fowls. After the singing and dancing in this way is over, the youths hold a feast on the third day.

Po:rag is the post-harvest festival of the Misings. Harvesting of paddy rice in autumn is usually observed now sometime in early winter or early spring. But there was a time when a harvest in summer was very common amongst them and so, Po:rag was celebrated earlier in the months of August or September also.

Another occasion called Dobur is an animistic rite performed occasionally by the village community by sacrificing a sow and some hens for different purposes. The form of observance of Dobur varies according to the purpose. In the most common form, the younger male members of a village beat the walls of every house in the village from one end to the other with big sticks to drive away the "ghosts and goblins hiding" and hold a feast there.

Some of the features of Bihu dances, boys and girls dancing together, for instance, may have been borrowed from the Misings.

Dress

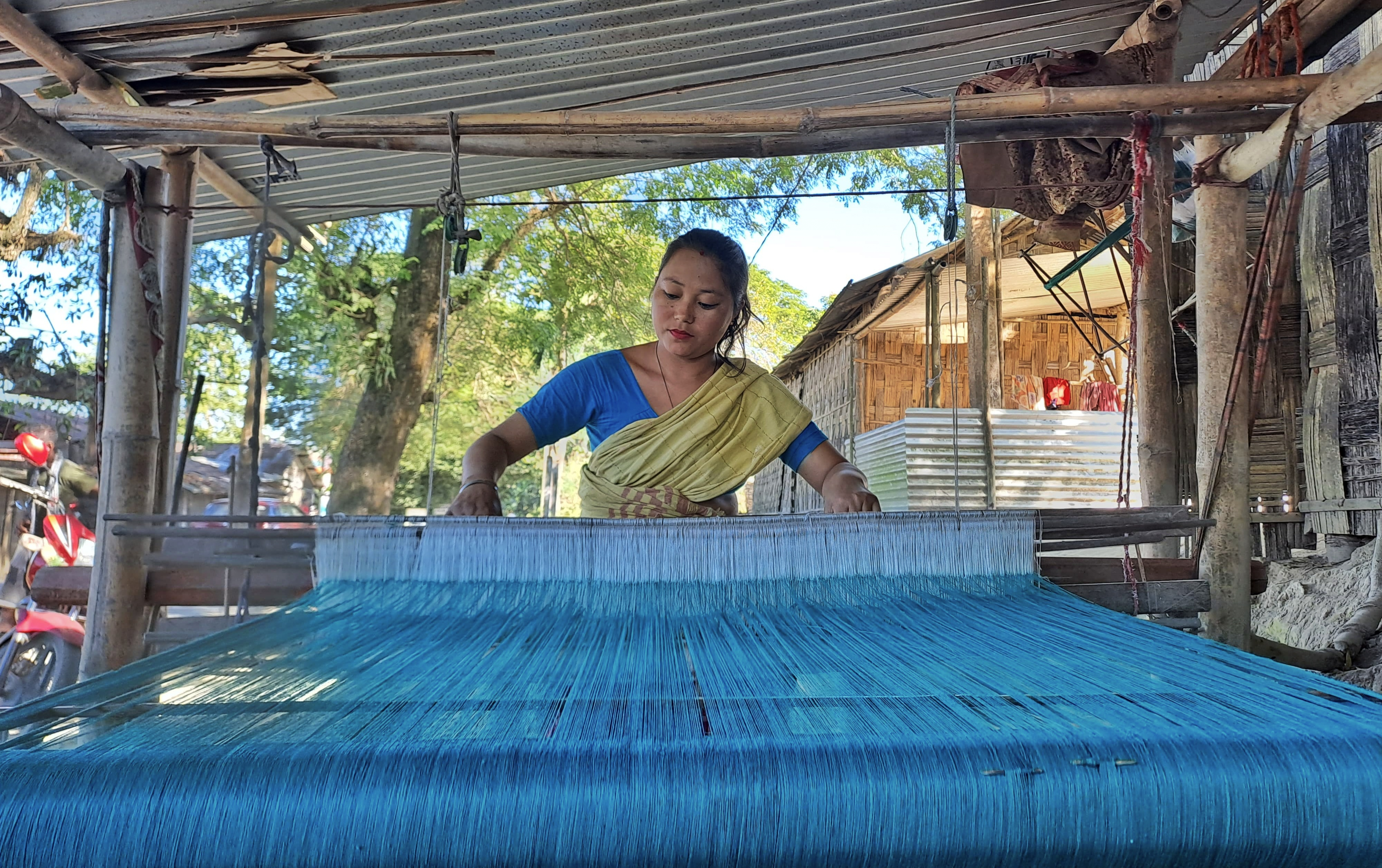
Mising woman weaving Mekhela sador at Majuli, Assam

The traditional craft of weaving is a very important aspect of Mising culture; the weaving loom is found in each and every rural household of the Mising people. It is an exclusive preserve of the Mising woman, who starts her training in the craft even before she reaches her teens. Men wear cotton jackets (Mibu Galuk), light cotton towels, endi shawls, thick loin cloths, and, occasionally, even shirtings. The sword that mising men carry is called "yoksa" and mising muffler is called "erkok". Women wear variety of clothes.

The ege is a lower garment, comprising a sheet of cotton. Above this they drape a ri:bi or Gaseng, both cotton sheets used to cover the ege and blouse. However, while the ri:bi has narrow stripes, the gaseng has broad stripes of contrasting colours. They wear a Gero: a sheet, usually off-white, wrapped round the waist to cover the lower part of the body, or round the chest to cover the body down to the knees or so, or a seleng gasor: a light cotton sheet, worn occasionally instead of a ri:bi or a gaseng. Other forms of clothing include the riya, a long, comparatively narrow sheet wrapped a bit tightly round the chest. Married women will wear the segrek, a loose piece of cloth, wrapped round the waist to cover the ege down to the knees. A po:tub is a scarf used to protect the head, and nisek is a piece of cloth to carry a baby with.

Before yarn was available in the market, Misings used to grow cotton and obtain cotton yarn by spinning. The use of endi yarn, obtained from worms fed on leaves of castor-oil plants, was once common amongst them. However, they have learnt the use of muga (silk obtained from silkworms fed on a kind of tall tree, called som in Assamese) and of paat (silk obtained from silkworms fed mulberry leaves) from neighbouring indigenous communities in the valley. Mising women weave cloths, using muga and paat silk, very sparingly.

The Misings also have a blanket called gadu, fluffy on one side, and woven on a traditional loin loom. The warp consist of cotton spun into thick and strong yarn, and the weft of cotton turned into soft yarn and cut into small pieces for insertion, piece by piece, to form the fluff.

== Notable people ==
- Bharat Narah, Politician
- Bhuban Gam, Politician
- Bhubon Pegu, Politician
- Ganesh Kutum, Politician
- Indira Miri, Educationist, Padma Shri
- Jadav Payeng, Environmentalist, Padma Shri
- Jogeswar Doley, Politician
- Lalit Kumar Doley, Politician
- Mrinal Miri, Philosopher, Padma Bhushan
- Naba Kumar Doley, Politician
- Paramananda Chayengia, Politician
- Rajib Lochan Pegu, Politician
- Ranoj Pegu, Politician
- Shakuntala Doley Gamlin, IAS Officer
- Tabu Taid, Author
- Tarawati Mili Bori, Singer
- Tarun Chandra Pamegam, Writer
- Tarulata Kutum, Singer-composer, Actress

== See also ==
- Takam Mising Porin Kebang
- Sanmilita Gana Shakti
- List of people of Tani descent
