= Archana Mahanta =

Indian folk singer (1949–2020)

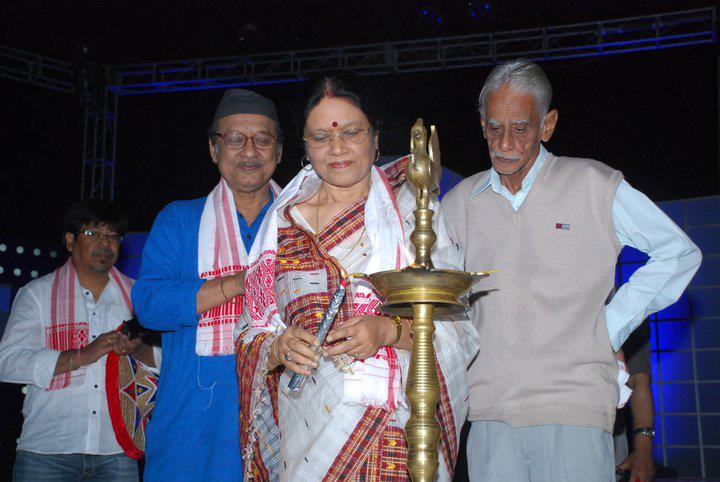
- Archana Mahanta with Khagen Mahanta and Hiren Bhattacharyya

Background information
- Born: 18 March 1949; Guwahati, Assam, India
- Died: 27 August 2020 (aged 71) Guwahati, Assam, India
- Genres: Folk
- Occupation: Singer
- Spouse: Khagen Mahanta

Archana Mahanta (18 March 1949 – 27 August 2020) was a renowned folk singer from Assam, India. Archana Mahanta and her late husband Khagen Mahanta had an enormous contribution in popularising and preserving Assamese folk music. The musical couple often performed together, singing many duet hits.

== Personal life ==
Archana Mahanta was the wife of Assamese folk singer Khagen Mahanta and the mother of popular singer Papon.

== Work ==
Some famous songs of Archana-Khagen duo include (in Assamese):

- Bhor Duporiya
- A Phool Pah Halichha Jalichha
- Bhal Lagi Jai O
- Chateo Matile
- Junti Ulale Torati Ulabo

== Death ==
Archana Mahanta died on 27 August 2020. She was suffering from diabetes, high blood pressure, and Parkinson's disease.
