= Khagen Mahanta =

Indian singer

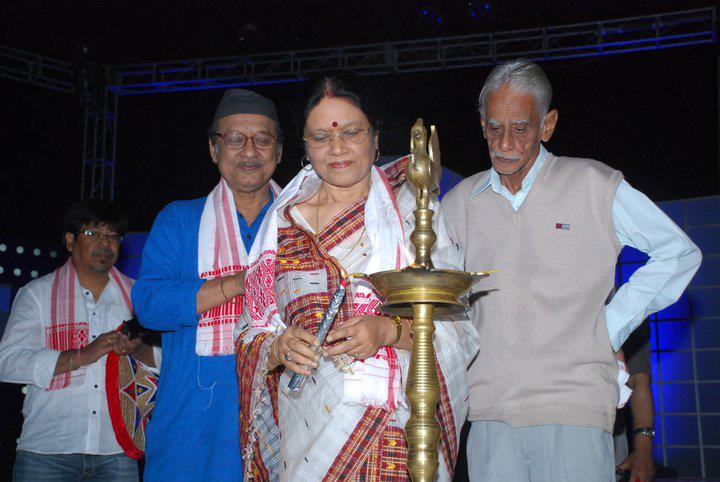
- Khagen Mahanta, Archana Mahanta & Hiren Bhattacharya
- Born: 17 August 1942; Nagaon, Assam, British India
- Died: 12 June 2014 (aged 71); Guwahati, Assam
- Other name: Bihu Samrat
- Occupations: Singer, Composer
- Years active: 1958–2014
- Spouse: Archana Mahanta
- Children: Papon( also known as Angaraag Mahanta), Kingkini Mahanta

Khagen Mahanta was a singer and composer of folk and traditional music of Assam. Khagen Mahanta was a notable person in Assamese folk music and known as the "King of Bihu". His Bihu songs, Borgeet and other folk songs remain popular in Assam. The artist, along with his wife Archana Mahanta and son Angaraag Mahanta who is known as Papon, represent one of the most influential families in Assamese music. He died on 12 June 2014.

== Early life ==
Khagen Mahanta was born to a Kalita (Kayastha) family Harendra Nath Mahanta and Laxmipriya Devi in Nagaon, Assam. He showed his musical talent from his childhood. At the age of fifteen he started performing in concerts in Shillong, where he was well received.

== Career ==
In 1958, he gained attention from Delhi Doordarshan (television) Center, which had just been established, and was given the opportunity to perform. His program was a great success.

During the "language movement" in 1960, Khagen Mahanta got actively involved in it under the leadership of personalities like Bishnuprasad Rabha, Hemanga Biswas, and Jugal Das. He was a member of the group "Harmony" and promoted human values with his melodious voice and compositions. In 1961, his first gramophone recorded song was broadcast from Guwahati All India radio center. He also participated in the "World Peace" festival in Calcutta. He was recognized as A grade artist in All India Radio and contributed in almost all genres of Assamese music like Lokageet, Okoni Geet, musicals, and dramas.

== Personal life ==
He was married to Archana Mahanta, also an Assamese folk singer. They performed together on many occasions, popularising Assamese folk music and earning a name as the most popular duet singers. Their son Angaraag Mahanta is also a singer like his parents and is popular in the genre of modern Assamese music; he lived in Mumbai. He has two grandchildren, Puhor and Parijaat. He also has a daughter, Kingkini Mahanta.

== Death ==
Khagen Mahanta died a sudden death at his own residence in Guwahati on the afternoon of 12 June 2014. The end came at 3:40 pm, sending shockwaves across the state. Mahanta is survived by his wife Archana Mahanta (who died in 2020) and son Angaraag Mahanta. State government declared a half holiday across the state on 13 June 2014.

== Awards ==
Khagen Mahanta has been decorated numerous times nationally and internationally for his contributions. He was also awarded the Sangeet Natak Academy award for folk and traditional music in 1992.

Some of his awards/ recognitions are listed below:

- 1988 - Film Craft Award
- 1992 - Sangeet Natak Academy
- 1994 - Shrimoy Award
- 1999 - Sangeetacharya
