= Jayanta Hazarika =

Indian singer and composer (1943–1977)

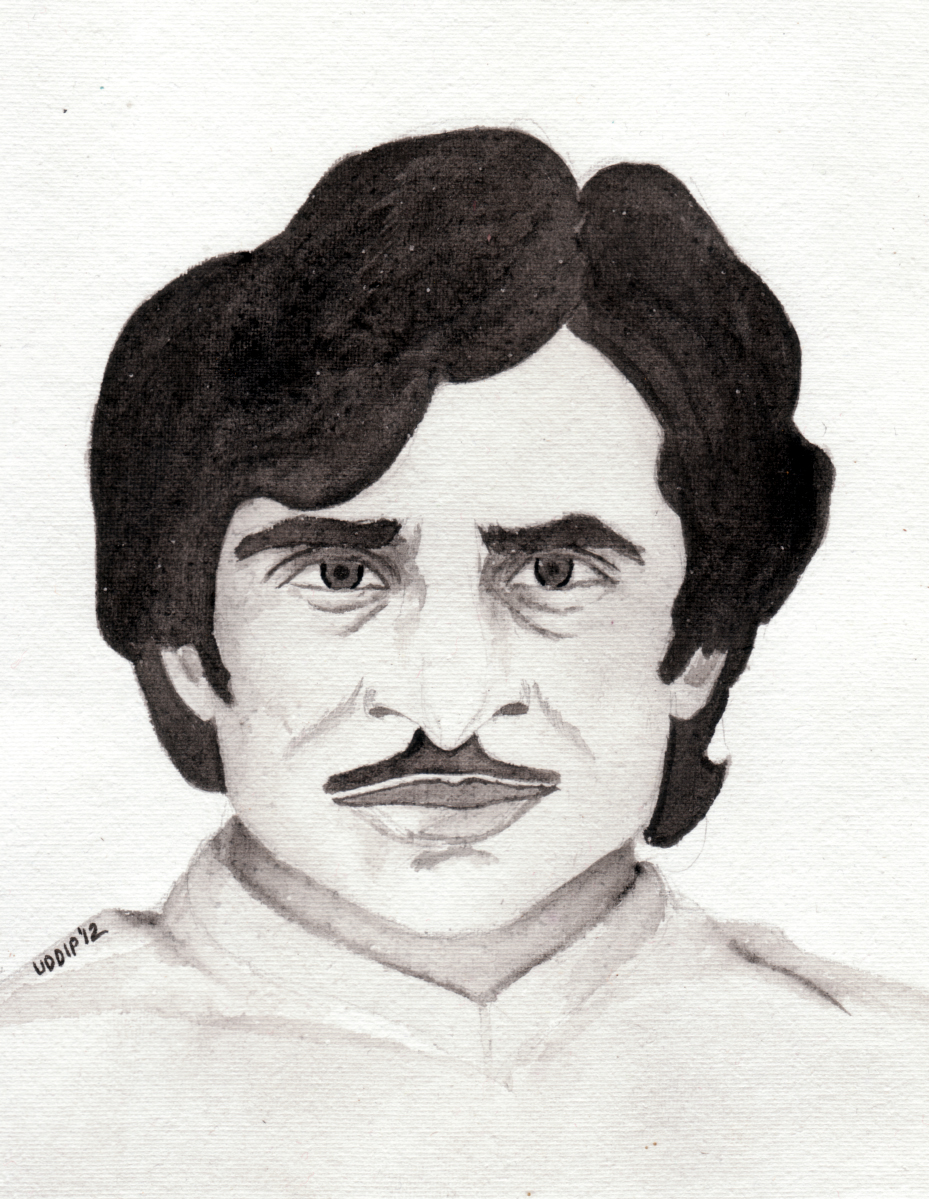
- Jayanta Hazarika (Rana)

Background information
- Born: Rana; 20 September 1943; Mangaldai, Assam Province, British India
- Origin: Assam
- Died: 15 October 1977 (aged 34) Kolkata, West Bengal, India
- Occupations: Singer, Composer, Music Director
- Years active: 1960 to 1977
- Spouse: Manisha Hazarika

Jayanta Hazarika (20 September 1943 – 15 October 1977) was an Indian singer and composer associated with Assamese music. He wrote lyrics for a few songs and composed music for several movies. He was the younger brother of Bhupen Hazarika.

Popularly known as Rana-da, Jayanta Hazarika was the younger brother of Late Dr. Bhupen Hazarika. He started his musical career accompanying his brother and later made his name as singer and composer in his own right. Jayanta was the first Assamese composer to fuse western musical forms such as rock and roll, jazz and Western Classical with traditional Assamese melodies and created a new sound. He was a pioneer in introducing several western instruments in his compositions.

== Personal life ==
Jayanta Hazarika was born into a famous musical family of Assam. He was the ninth amongst 10 children of father Nilakanta Hazarika and mother Shantipriya Hazarika. Bhupen Hazarika, 17 years his senior, was his eldest brother. On 20 September 1943, Jayanta was born in Mangaldai. Jayanta grew up in an environment full of music since his early childhood. All his brothers and sisters were deeply involved with music. At the age of nine, Jayanta composed the melody for a song written by his elder brother, Nripen Hazarika. Jayanta Hazarika studied high-school in the Sonaram High School of Guwahati. He failed in his matriculation examination in 1962 and went to Calcutta, where he recorded two songs with His Master's Voice.

Returning from Calcutta, Jayanta Hazarika assisted his brother Bhupen Hazarika as music director of the film 'Maniram Dewan'. Then onwards, he continued singing and worked as a music director for several films. In 1969, Jayanta married Manisha Hazarika from Calcutta. Mayukh Hazarika is their only son born on 13 January 1971. Both Manisha Hazarika and Mayukh Hazarika are established singers.

Jayanta Hazarika went to Calcutta in 1977 to record music for the movie 'Natun Asha'. There he fell suddenly ill and died on 15 October, aged 34. He is survived by his wife and son. Despite being the second youngest child, he was outlived by most of his siblings, including his eldest brother, who died 34 years later.

== Musical career ==
Jayanta Hazarika's musical career began with him accompanying his brother Bhupen Hazarika in stages and recordings. The first two songs Jayanta recorded with His Master's Voice were Aagoli botahe kopale kolore paat and Krishnachura Krishnachura, which became instant hits and started his professional musical career. In 1963, Jayanta did his first playback singing with the song Sonar baran pakhire tor along with Shyamal Mitra for the movie 'Maniram Dewan'. Bhupen Hazarika was the music director of this movie. Jayanta along with Himangshu Biswas worked as assistant music director for this movie. Thereafter, Jayanta began full-time singing and music composition. Jayanta Hazarika worked as assistant music director for Bhupen Hazarika's movie 'Loti-Ghoti' and 'Chikmik Bijuli'. He did small roles for two Assamese movies 'Loti-Ghoti' and 'Chikmik bijuli'.

Jayanta Hazarika composed music for feature films, documentaries and stage-plays. In his brother Bhupen Hazarika's directorial venture 'Chikmik Bijuli', Jayanta composed his first song for a movie. Jayanta composed and sang the song Mrityu xawati samadhi tolit in this movie where Bhupen Hazarika was the music director. He also composed the background score for this movie. In 1971, Jayanta Hazarika began as an independent music director with the movie 'Bonoria phul'. Later on he gave music to 'Niyoti', 'Brishti', 'Dharmakaai' and 'Natun asha'. Music for Natun asha was complete by Manisha Hazarika following his untimely death. He also worked as a music director of several documentary films.

Jayanta Hazarika was associated with music direction for stage-plays. He gave music to prestigious productions like Phani Sarma's 'Siraj' and Prafulla Bora's 'Baan'. Jayanta was associated with the 'Pragoti Shilpi Sangha' of Guwahati and composed for several stage productions by the group. Jayanta also gave music to a mobile theatre group named 'Lakhimi Theatre' from Goalpara formed in memory of Pramathesh Barua. In the year 1977, Jayanta Hazarika along with lyricist Nirmalprabha Bordoloi composed 17 songs for 5 plays by this theatre group in a span of 3 days between 13 and 16 September. In an interview to given to AIR, Guwahati he said, "I enjoy more creating music for stage-plays"' ("মঞ্চ-নাটৰ সংগীত পৰিচালনা কৰি মই বেছি ভাল পাওঁ..") He was regularly associated with AIR, Guwahati.

In between music direction and recording, Jayanta used to frequent various stage-shows both inside and outside Assam. He accompanied his brother Bhupen Hazarika to sing in the 'International Conference of Political Music' held in Berlin on 14 February 1972. He visited Bangladesh with his brother.

=== Characteristics of Music ===
Jayanta Hazarika was a seasoned player of several musical instruments. He played guitar, domra, mandolin, accordion, tabla, and harmonica. He used to collect various traditional musical instruments from other parts of the world. He could play the Harmonium in two different octaves simultaneously.

Jayanta Hazarika created music with a mix of Traditional Assamese tunes along with Western instruments. His deft fusion of western tunes gave his music a uniqueness not associated with Modern Assamese songs until then. He also used unconventional preludes and interludes. The combination of Nirmalprabha Bordolo's lyrics and Jayanta Hazarika's composition are considered everlasting melodies of Assam. Most of the songs created by this pair are still extremely popular.

=== Xur Bahini ===
In 1977, Jayanta Hazarika formed an institution named Xur Bahini. This was formed with the help of people from Golaghat to help the flood-victims of Assam. This group used to sing in the streets and collect remunerations which later was donated. Many singers joined Xur Bahini under Jayanta Hazarika's leadership. A total of 8 songs were composed for Xur Bahini. The songs are: "Luitor Boliya Baan", "Durjog lagnar dekho hahankar", "Aaji pranor mela patiso", "Bhoy naai bhoy naai", "Eko naai xunya haai", "Etiyao raati naai", "Obhijatri duroir ratri" and "Aeito prahar xunya prahar". On 13 August 1977 Xur Bahini went to Dibrugarh to raise faunds to help the treatment of Maghai Ojha. Jayanta Hazarika said about Xur Bahini:

"Now I will speak. I will speak with my melodies, my songs. I shall come out to sing in the streets, not on the stage. The goal of Xur Bahini is to stand with the people during trying times. Xur Bahini will prevent the rise of evil with melodies and songs."
("মই এতিয়া কথা ক'ম। কথা ক'ম মোৰ সুৰেৰে, মোৰ গীতেৰে। মই গীত গাবলৈ ওলাই আহিম আলিবাটলৈ, মঞ্চলৈ নহয়। মোৰ এই সুৰ বাহিনীৰ উদ্দেশ্য হ'ল ৰাইজৰ বিপদৰ সময়ত, দুৰ্যোগৰ সময়ত সুৰ বাহিনীয়ে ৰাইজৰ কাষত সদায়ে থিয় দিবগৈ। সংস্কৃতিৰ নামৰ দুষ্কৃতিৰ পোহাৰ মেলাসকলক সুৰ বাহিনীয়ে বাধা দিব সুৰেৰে গীতেৰে।")

== Works ==
=== Playback (Movies) ===
- Maniram Dewan
- Loti-Ghoti
- Phaguni
- Chikmik Bijuli and more

=== Music Director (feature film) ===
Jayanta Hazarika worked as assistant music director with his brother Bhupen Hazarika for Maniram Dewan, Loti-Ghoti and Chikmik Bijuli. In Chikmik bijuli, he also composed a background score.

- Banaria Phul, (1971, dir: Atul Borodloi)
- Brishti, (1975, dir: Deuti Barua)
- Niyoti, (1978, dir: Indukalpa Hazarika)
- Dharmakaari (1977, dir: Bhaben Das)
- Natun Asha (1977, dir: Probir Mitra; Manisha Hazarika completes this movie after his Jayanta's untimely death)

He was composing music for a few more films, but could not complete them:

- Ronga Megh (dir: Atul Bordoloi)
- Enajori (dir: Gouri Barman, completed 5 songs)
- Pohar (dir: Manik Bora, completed 2 songs)
- Upapath (dir: Hemanta Dutta; Manisha Hazarika completed this movie.)

=== Music Direction (Documentaries) ===
- Flora and Fauna of North-East India
- Wheels and the Horizon
- Xonman
- Jyoti Chitraban

=== Music Direction (Stage-plays) ===
- Siraj (dramatist: Phani Sharma)
- Baan (dramataist: Prafulla Bora)
- Jinty
- Janma
- Juddha Ghoxonaar Din
- Jerengar Xoti
- 5 plays for Lakhimi Theatre
