= Tokari geet =

Assamese Tukari Geet Sung by Arun Bhuyan, a blind singer from Assam

Tokari geet is a type of Assamese folk song sung playing a Tokari. Earlier it was called Tokari naam. It is so called because a tokari is played while singing it. A tokari is a single stringed musical instrument played with the fingers; a kind of guitar.

These are usually philosophical songs based on human life, stories from Ramayana, Mahabharata, gods and goddesses. Besides, stories of Sankardev and Madhavdeva is also sung here. A tokari can be played with dihanaam, but it cannot be called a tokari geet.

== See also ==
- Music of Assam
