= Tarawati Mili Bori =

Indian singer from Assam

Tarawati Bori
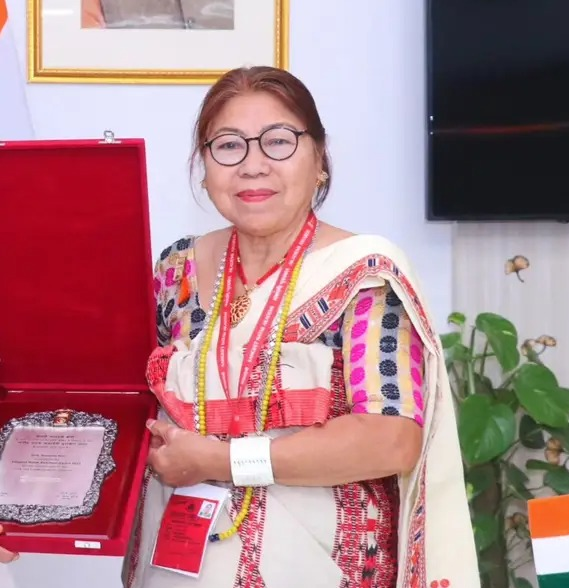

Background information
- Born: 9 January 1959 (age 67); Disangmukh, Sivasagar district, Assam, India
- Genres: folk music
- Occupations: musician, songwriter, composer
- Instrument: Indian harmonium
- Years active: 1977–present
- Award: Sangeet Natak Akademi Award

Tarawati Mili Bori (born 9 January 1959) is an Indian singer of Mising folk music and Oi: Nitom from the state of Assam.

Mili was awarded the Sangeet Natak Akademi Award for the year 2022 by the President of India, Smt. Droupadi Murmu in New Delhi on 6 March 2024, for her outstanding contribution to the folk and traditional music of Assam.

She is also known as Melody Queen of Mising folk songs.

== Early life ==
Mili was born on 9 January 1959 in Disangmukh, Sivasagar district, Assam to Betang Mili and Uneshwari Mili. On 19 July 1981, she married to Lakhi Bori.

She completed her matriculation from Disangmukh High School in the year 1977.

== Musical career ==
She was interested in music since her early school days. In 1977, Tarawati's voice gained a lot of popularity when she began singing on All India Radio, Dibrugarh. Her melodious voice caught the attention of Bharat Ratna Bhupen Hazarika, in 1984 he invited her to Kolkata to sing in the album Mishing Mipak and in 1985 she also sang for Miri Jiyori film.

== Honours and awards ==
- Sangeet Natak Akademi Award
- Bhupen Hazarika Sanghati Award
- Prag Prerona Award
