= Mrinal Miri =

Indian philosopher (born 1940)

Member of Parliament, Rajya Sabha
- In office 29 June 2012 – 21 March 2016
- Preceded by: Ram Dayal Munda, INC
- Constituency: Nominated

Personal details
- Born: August 1, 1940 (age 86) Assam, British India (now Meghalaya,India)
- Citizenship: India
- Education: University of Cambridge
- Occupation: Educator
- Awards: Padma Bhushan

Mrinal Miri (born 1 August 1940) is an Indian philosopher and educationalist.

== Early life ==
He was awarded a BA in Philosophy from the University of Cambridge in 1966 and gained his doctorate in 1970.

== Career ==
From 1970 to 1974 he was a lecturer in philosophy at St. Stephen's College under the University of Delhi, before moving to North Eastern Hill University. Mrinal also served as the director of the Indian Institute of Advanced Study, Shimla, from 1993 to 1999. He was nominated as a member of Rajya Sabha on 21 March 2012.

He was a member of the National Advisory Council established by the Manmohan Singh UPA I government. He is a member of the council set up for the implementation of RTE act also called as NAC.

== Personal life ==
He is married to Sujata Miri, a fellow philosopher.

== Honors and awards ==
Mrinal Miri was awarded the third-highest civilian honour by the President of India, Dr. A.P.J. Abdul Kalam, in 2005 for his contribution in the field of education and literature. In 2010, Miri was awarded the Pandit Iswar Chandra Vidyasagar Gold Plaque by the Asiatic Society of India in recognition of his contributions to social understanding. In the same year, He received the Madhabdev Award for his scholarly excellence by the Government of Assam.

Ribbon	Decoration	Country	Date	Note	Ref.
	Padma Bhushan	India	2005	The third-highest civilian honour of India.	

== Publications ==
- The Place of Humanities in Our Universities (ed), Routledge, 2018 (ISBN 978-1-138-10638-3)
- The Idea of Surplus: Tagore and Contemporary Human Sciences (ed), Routledge, New Delhi, 2016 (ISBN 978-1-138-63991-1)
- Philosophy and Education, Oxford University Press, 2014 (ISBN 0-19-945276-8)
- Identity and the Moral life, Oxford University Press, 2002 ISBN 0-19-566064-1
- Tribal India: Continuity and Change (Ed), Indian Institute of Advanced Study, Shimla, 1993
- Five Essays on Kant (Ed), North Eastern Hill University, 1987
- Philosophy of Psychoanalysis, Indian Institute of Advanced Study, Shimla, 1997.
