= Tokari =

Stringed musical instrument

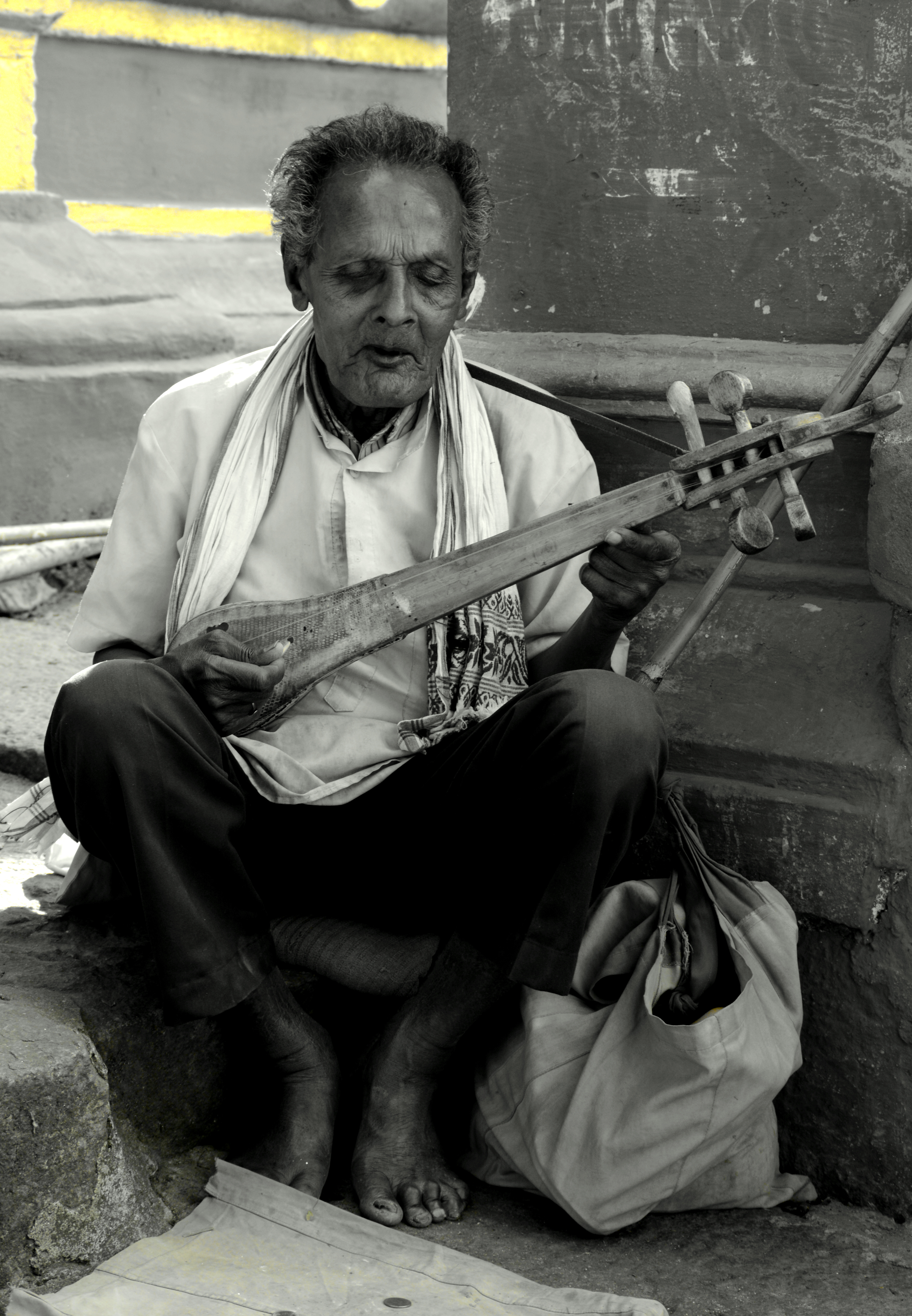
- A Singer playing 'Tokari'

String instrument
- Classification: String instruments

Related instruments
- Dotora; Sitar; Guitar

The Tokari (Assamese: টোকাৰী) is a stringed instrument played with the fingertips. The Tokari is the most widely used and popular stringed instruments in different parts of Assam. It is an ancient folk instrument of Assam. The instrument is usually made by covering a shell of Mango or Cham wood with the skin of a goat. It has many similarities to the "Dotara", another such folk instrument prevalent in southern Assam. The Tokari is slightly larger and wider than the Dotora. It also has many similarities to the Ruan, a Chinese musical instrument.

== Etymology ==
It is believed that the name Tokari derives from the Assamese word "tokar" (Assamese: টোকৰ), meaning the sound produced by knocking.

== Uses ==
Tokari is usually played with Tokari geet. A tokari can be also played with Dihanaam, Deh Bichar Geet, Bairagi geet, Phul Kowar aru Mani Konwaror geet, Maniram Dewanor geet, Assamese religious songs, Jikir and Jari etc.
