= Oi Nitom =

Oi Nitom (Mising: Oi Ni:tom; Assamese: ঐনিতম) is a traditional music form of the Mising community of Assam. The Mising tribes consider this type of song as a folk song.

== Characterization ==
Missing Oinitam Song By Rahul Narah.

Oi Nitom can be characterized as songs of love. The term Oi Nitom literally means "song of the dear one" in the Mising language. They are then in some ways similar to Bihu with natural lyricism and picturesque imagery.

An example:

Longé: miksi dínamdém

Apongépé tí:langka

Yumé miksi dénamdém

Kerasinpé romlangka

== In the Mishing community ==
The Mising people have several forms of folk songs, such as Abang, Kabang, Birig, Lupo and Oi Nitom. However, the form of Oi Nitom has gained exceptional prominence and attention compared to other forms of Mising folk music.

Another way of classifying Mising folk songs is as Religious Abang, Oi Nitom, Kaban, Ko-ni-nam and Moman, where Oi Nitoms are songs of love, Kaban are songs of lamentation and Ko-ni-nam are lullabies. Oi Nitom has slowly replaced Kaban, which used to be the prominent form of folk music among the Mising.

The Mising people dance to the tune of Oi Nitom in festivals like Ali Aye Ligang.
