= Papon (singer) =

Indian playback singer and composer (born 1975)

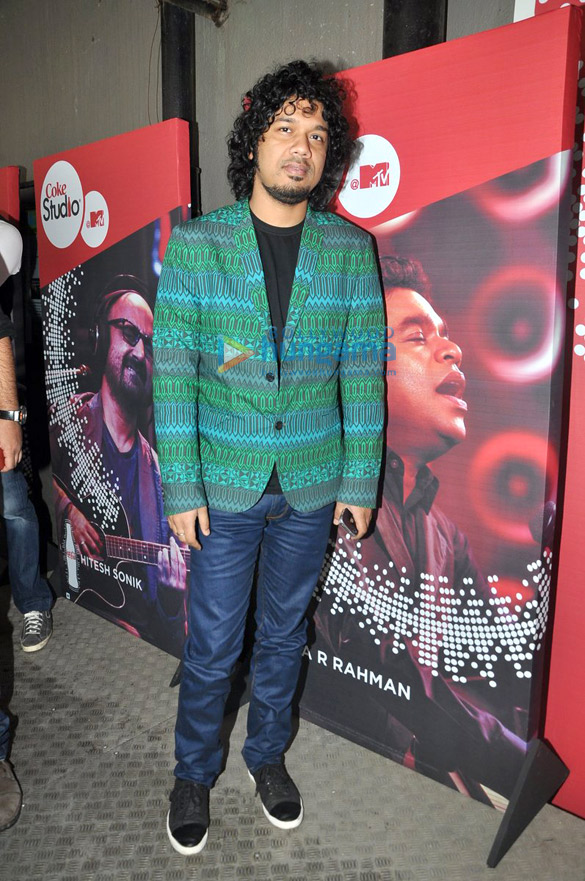
- Mahanta at the Coke Studio Season 3 launch
- Pronunciation: [papɔn]; [ɔŋɡɔɹaɡ mɔɦɔntɔ]
- Born: Angaraag Mahanta; 24 November 1975 (age 50); Nagaon, Assam, India
- Musical career
- Also known as: Papon
- Genres: Electro fusion; Indian classical; Pop; Folk music; Filmi; Jazz; Indie Rock; bhajans; Ghazals; Sufi; Khyal; R&B; Qawwali
- Occupations: Singer; songwriter; composer; multi-instrumentalist; producer; actor
- Instruments: Vocals; guitar
- Years active: 1988–present
- Labels: MDR Records, Times Music, T-Series, Sony Music

Angaraag Mahanta (Note: Assamese: [ɔŋɡɔɹaɡ mɔɦɔntɔ].) (Assamese: [ɔŋɡɔɹaɡ mɔɦɔntɔ]; born 24 November 1975), known by his stagename Papon, (Note: Assamese: [papɔn].) is an Indian playback singer and composer from Assam. Papon has a wide variety of influences and considered to be an extremely versatile artist. Papon has sung in Assamese, Hindi, Bengali, Tamil, Marathi, Urdu, Mising, Bodo, Tiwa, Punjabi and Odia. He is the lead vocalist and founder of the folk-fusion band Papon and The East India Company. He is the son of the noted Assamese singer Khagen Mahanta and Archana Mahanta.

== Career ==
Papon made his official debut as a singer with the Assamese track, "Gaantu je gaai asila" from the album "Aamiu Gao Gaan" in 1988. In 1998 he also sang the Assamese song "Nasaba Sokule" with Zubeen Garg, on the album Snigdha Junak.In 2004 he released his first album, Junaki Raati.

Papon made his debut in Bollywood with the song "Om mantra" from the film Strings – bound by faith in 2006. In 2011, his song was "Jiyein Kyun" from the movie Dum Maro Dum which was his first big hit. In 2014, he sang "Lakeerein", which is a poem by Gulzar, for the film Kya Dilli Kya Lahore and "Sun RI Bavli" for Nagesh Kukunoor's film Lakshmi. In 2015, he sang "Moh moh ke dhage" for the film Dum Laga Ke Haisha and "Humnava" in Hamari Adhuri Kahani (2015). In 2016, he sang "Bulleya" for the film Sultan. In August 2016, Red Bull released "Hometown Heroes," a seven-part documentary web series that revisits the story of Papon's youth and rising career. Papon's 2018 song "Baba Bolta Hain Bas Ho Gaya", from the movie Sanju, comments on differences between the real Sanju and the "reel" Sanju.

== Filmography ==
=== Television ===
In 2013, Papon was responsible for the theme song for MTV Roadies X: Battle for Glory – "Jajabor" (Jajabor being an Assemese word for yayavar – "traveler").

In 2017, he was one of the judge in The Voice India Kids.

=== Film ===
Year	Film	Role	Note
2014	Rodor Sithi		
2025	Metro... In Dino		

== Band ==
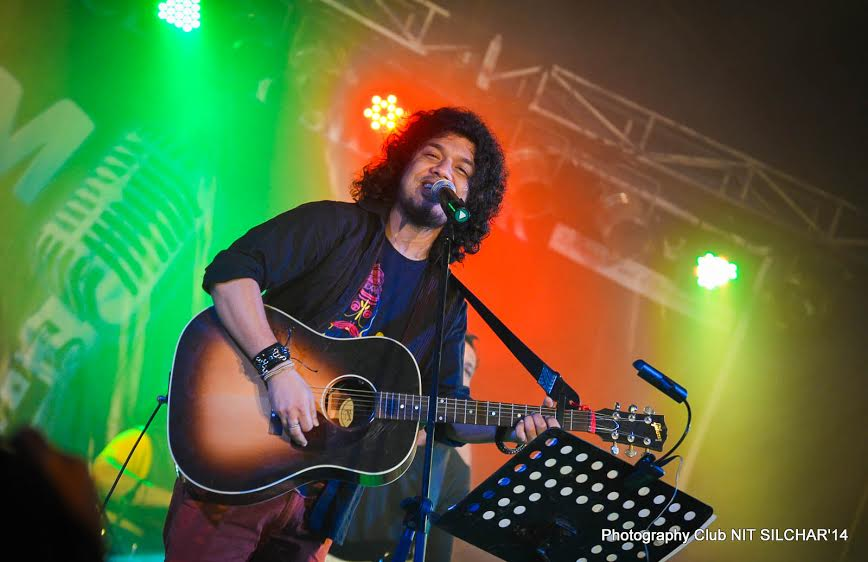
Papon performing in Incandescence at NIT Silchar, 10 February 2014

In 2007, Papon formed an electronic folk-fusion band called Papon and The East India Company. The band consists of Papon on vocals, Brin Desai and Hameem Kader on live electronics, Jinti on lead guitars, Kirti on percussion and Dipu on bass and Tanmay on Drums The six members came from backgrounds varying from Assamese folk to metal and blues to trip hop.

The band has performed twice at the SAARC Music Band Festival in New Delhi, the Eastwind Festival, and the Kovalam Literary Festival and has performed overseas with Sutasi in Singapore. The band took a two-year break in the wait for a solo album which was released internationally at the end of 2011. The band is back in action in November with 4 big festivals in the same month. They also played at the October Fest in Bangalore, NH7 Weekender fest in Pune and the Rock for Rights concert in New Delhi.

== Personal life and education ==
His father, Khagen Mahanta, died on 12 June 2014.

He now lives in Mumbai with his wife Shweta Mishra Mahanta. They have two children.

He initially went there for Architecture but later enrolled himself to a degree in English Literature in Delhi University. He spent some time in Ramjas College before he shifted to Motilal Nehru College.

=== Controversies ===
Papon, who was a mentor and judge on The Voice India Kids, on Facebook live-streaming from his own page was seen putting Holi colors on an 11-year-old girl, and was alleged on media and social media to have kissed her. On 24 Feb 2018, The police lodged a case against him after a complaint from the Assam State Commission for Protection of Child Rights. Along with the other contestants present on the video streaming and their respective guardians, the parents of the minor also denied allegations against Papon stating that it was fatherly love shown by Papon and there was no kiss.

He left the reality TV show as judge due to the allegations.

A court of law later found insufficient reason to charge Papon based on the police investigation reports and closed the case and stated that the case arose due to a mistake of fact.

== Collaborations ==
Papon has featured in albums which carry the labels of MDR Records, in a collaboration with Times Music, and has also featured in the soundtrack of Bollywood films Dum Maaro Dum, I Am Kalam, Soundtrack, Patang, and most recently Barfi!. He also featured on the Indian leg of the show Coke Studio @ MTV. He performed on the show Global Indian Film Awards with MIDIval Punditz, Kailash Kher and Shubha Mudgal. He also appeared on STAR World India, Episode six of The Dewarists with Rabbi Shergill and recorded a song "Khule Da Rabb". Papon has also worked with Shantanu Moitra in the 4th season of The Dewarists for 'O Megh' which is inspired by Rabindranath Tagore's poem of same name.

== Awards ==
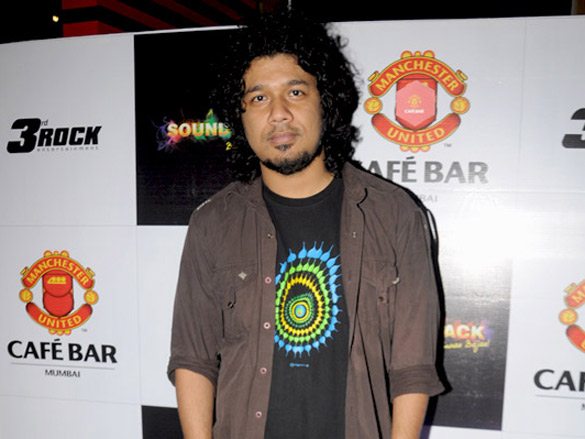
Papon From The 'Soundtrack' music success celebration

Awards and nominations received by Papon
Year	Ceremony	Category	Nominated work	Result	Ref.
2011	Big Asomiya Music Awards 2010	Best Singer (Male)	"Ujai Ja Noi" – Raamdhenu	Won	
2011	Global Indian Music Academy Awards	Best Folk Album	Gomseng	Nominated	
2011	Global Indian Music Academy Awards	Best Folk Album	Phagunar Gaan	Nominated	
2012	Prag Cine Awards	Best Playback Singer (Male)	Title track – Raamdhenu	Won	
2012	Global Indian Music Academy Awards	Best Pop Album	The Story So Far	Won	
2012	Bhupen Hazarika Award	Best Male Singer		Won	
2013	Stardust Awards	New Musical Sensation – Singer (Male)	"Kyun" – Barfi!	Nominated	
2013	Prag Cine Awards	Best Playback Singer (Male)	Rowd	Nominated	
2013	JD Rock Awards	Best Male Vocalist		Won	
2013	JD Rock Awards	Song of the Year	"Boitha Maro Re"	Won	
2013	JD Rock Awards	Best Band/Artist of the Year		Nominated	
2013	JD Rock Awards	Best Album	The Story So Far	Nominated	
2014	Prag Cine Awards	Best Playback Singer (Male)	Bhal Pabo Najanilu	Nominated	
2014	Radio City Freedom Awards	Best Folk Fusion Artist – Judges' Choice		Won	
2015	Prag Cine Awards	Best Supporting Actor (Male)	Rodor Sithi	Nominated	
2015	Prag Cine Awards	Best Playback Singer (Male)	"Protidine" – Rodor Sithi	Nominated	
2015	Global Indian Music Academy Awards	Best Pop Album	Coke Studio @ MTV – Season 3	Won	
2015	FOI Online Awards	Best Playback Singer (Male)		Nominated	
2015	Most Popular Youth Icon Awards	Boys' Section		Won	
2015	Prag Cine Awards	Global Icon Award		Won	
2016	News Live – Assamese of the Year	Assamese of the Year		Won	
2016	22nd Screen Awards	Best Male Playback Singer	"Moh Moh Ke Dhaage" – Dum Laga Ke Haisha	Won	
2016	8th Mirchi Music Awards	Male Vocalist of the Year	"Moh Moh Ke Dhaage" – Dum Laga Ke Haisha	Won	
2016	Times of India Film Awards	Best Playback Singer (Male)	"Moh Moh Ke Dhaage" – Dum Laga Ke Haisha	Won	
2016	Global Indian Music Academy Awards	Best Playback Singer (Male)	"Moh Moh Ke Dhaage" – Dum Laga Ke Haisha	Won	
2016	International Indian Film Academy Awards	Best Male Playback Singer	"Moh Moh Ke Dhaage" – Dum Laga Ke Haisha	Won	
2016	61st Filmfare Awards	Best Male Playback Singer	"Moh Moh Ke Dhaage" – Dum Laga Ke Haisha	Nominated	
2016	Zee Cine Awards	Best Playback Singer (Male)	"Moh Moh Ke Dhaage" – Dum Laga Ke Haisha	Nominated	
2016	Global Indian Music Academy Awards	Best Film Song	"Moh Moh Ke Dhaage" – Dum Laga Ke Haisha	Nominated	
2016	Radio City Freedom Awards	Best Indie Collaboration – Judges' Choice	Collaboration with Midival Punditz and Malini Awasthi	Won	
2016	Pride of Assam	Special Recognition		Won	
2017	Mirchi Music Awards	Critics' Award – Album of the Year	Sultan	Nominated	
2018	FOI Online Awards	Best Playback Singer (Male)	"Chaav Laaga" – Sui Dhaaga	Nominated	
2020	Prag Cine Awards	Best Playback Singer (Male)	"Bechera Ei Mon"	Nominated	
2020	West Bengal Film Journalists' Association Awards	Best Playback Singer (Male)	Tritio Adhyay	Nominated	
2024	Prag Cine Awards	Best Playback Singer (Male)	Jiya	Won	
2024	ScreenXX Summit & Awards	Viewer's Choice – Playback Singer (Male), Hindi Web Originals	Dillogical	Won	
2024	FOI Online Awards	Best Playback Singer (Male)	"Nazar Teri Toofan"	Nominated	
2025	FOI Online Awards	Best Playback Singer (Male)	"Qayde Se"	Nominated	
2025	FOI Online Awards	Best Original Song	"Qayde Se"	Nominated	
2025	FOI Online Awards	Best Original Song	"Ul Jalool Ishq"	Nominated	
2026	Filmfare Awards Assamese	Best Playback Singer (Male)	"Xopun Xopun" – Jiya	Won	

== See also ==
- List of Indian playback singerback singers
