= ASAM =

ASAM or Asam may refer to:

- American Society of Addiction Medicine, an addiction medicine professional society
- `Asam, a village in eastern Yemen
- Asam (surname)
- Asian Americans, Americans of Asian descent
- Association for Standardisation of Automation and Measuring Systems, a professional association that coordinates the development of technical standards
- Australian School of Advanced Medicine, a medical school associated with Macquarie University in Sydney, Australia
- Avrasya Stratejik Araştırmalar Merkezi, Center for Eurasian Strategic Studies, based in Turkey
- Asam, another name for Tamarind, the leguminous tree native to tropical Africa
- Asam, alternative spelling for Assam, a state in northeastern India

== See also ==
- Assam (disambiguation)
- Dainik Asam, a daily Assamese-language newspaper in Assam, India
