= Sarthebari Bell Metal Craft =

Traditional metalcraft practiced in India

Sarthebari Metal Craft
- Geographical indication
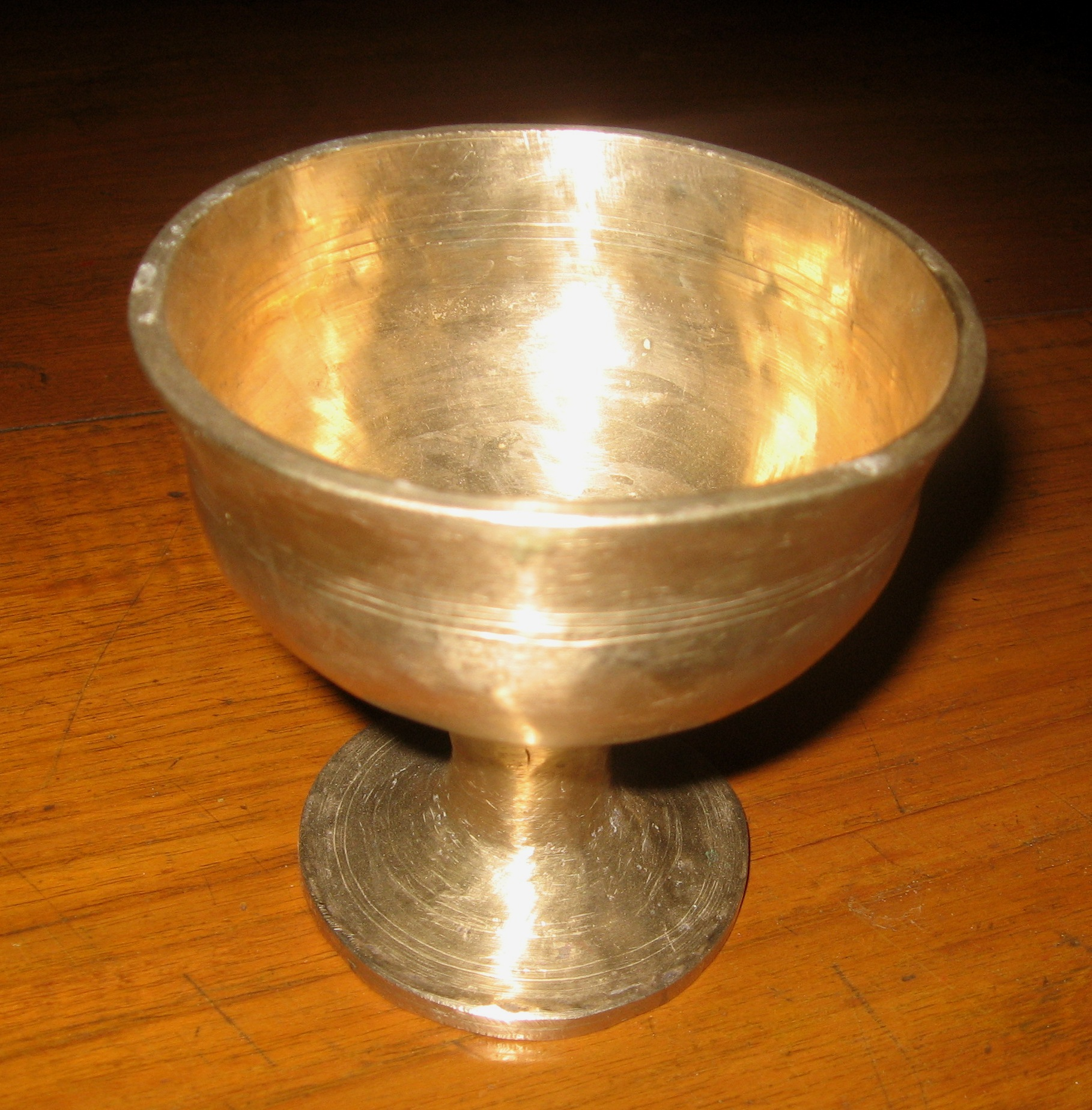
- A traditional assamese bowl (Banbati) made with Bell metal
- Description: Bell metal craft from Sarthebari, Assam
- Type: Handicraft
- Area: Sarthebari, Bajali district, Assam
- Country: India
- Material: Bell metal

Sarthebari Bell Metal Craft is a traditional metalcraft practiced in Sarthebari, a town in the Bajali district of Assam, India. It is one of the most prominent handicraft traditions of the state and is widely known for its bell metal utensils, ritual objects, and musical instruments. The craft has played an important role in the cultural life of Assam and continues to provide livelihoods to a large number of artisan families.

== History ==
The bell metal tradition of Sarthebari has ancient origins and is believed to date back several centuries. Historical references indicate that bell metal objects from Assam were produced as early as the 7th century during the reign of King Kumar Bhaskar Varman. During this period, bell metal vessels and cymbals were exchanged as gifts with other kingdoms, highlighting the cultural and artistic significance of the craft. B. K. Barua, in his discussion of ornaments, cites the Kalika Purana, which refers to kāṃsya, identified by him as bell metal, alongside iron and other metals.

An explicit Buranji reference to specialist bell-metal workers occurs in connection with the conquest of the Chutia Kingdom. According to the Banhgaria Burhagohain Buranji, preserved in the Deodhai Asam Buranji, following the fall of the Chutia kingdom, the Ahoms obtained, along with people belonging to various other occupational groups, kahar (bell-metal workers) from the conquered territory. The craft flourished further under the Ahom rule, when royal patronage encouraged the production of high-quality bell metal utensils for ceremonial and domestic use. Over time, Sarthebari emerged as the principal centre of bell metal production in Assam. The craft has traditionally been practised by artisan communities such as the Kahar or Oja, who have passed down skills and techniques through generations.

== Materials and Techniques ==
Bell metal locally known as Kaah is an alloy primarily composed of copper and tin, usually in a ratio of about seventy-eight percent copper and twenty-two percent tin. The raw materials are melted in charcoal-fired furnaces and poured into clay moulds prepared by hand. After cooling, the cast objects are shaped and refined through repeated hammering using traditional tools such as hammers, chisels, and anvils.

The finishing process involves polishing the surface with natural materials like charcoal, clay, and fibres to achieve a smooth texture and a characteristic golden-brown sheen. Decorative designs are engraved by hand and often feature floral motifs, geometric patterns, and elements inspired by Assamese culture.

== Products ==
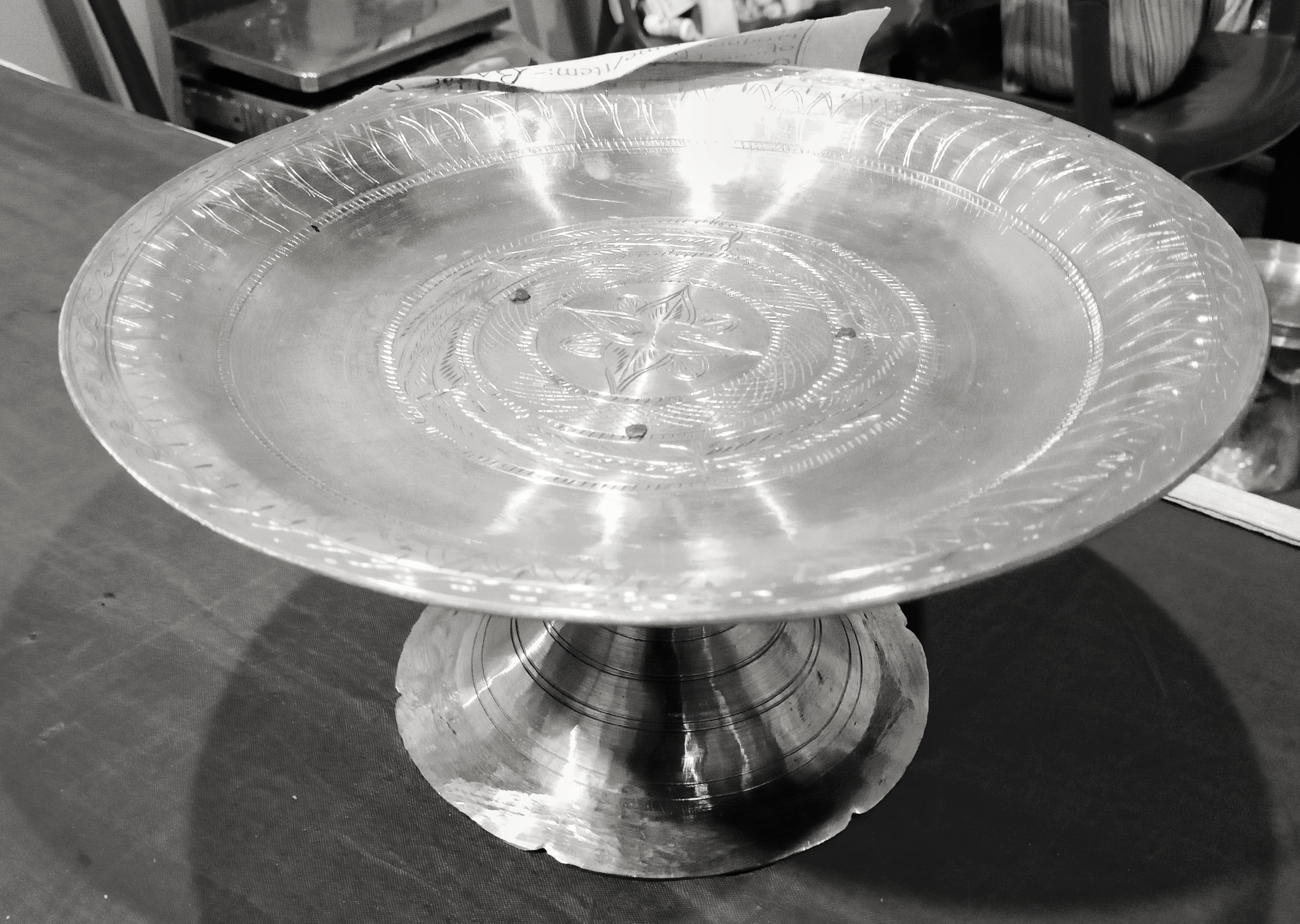
Baankaahi, a bell metal utensil typically used in Assam.

Artisans of Sarthebari produce a wide range of bell metal items that are commonly used in Assamese households and rituals. These include water pots known as kalah and lota, bowls called bati, dishes known as kahi, trays, decorative products, decorative Jaapi, temple bells known as ghonta and the traditional offering utensil with a stand known as Xorai. Musical instruments like cymbals, locally called tal, are also an important part of the craft.

These products are used for daily household purposes as well as during religious ceremonies, weddings, festivals, and cultural events. Bell metal utensils are traditionally valued for their durability and cultural significance.

== Socio-economic Importance ==
The bell metal craft of Sarthebari is one of the largest cottage industries in Assam and is considered second only to bamboo craft in terms of scale. A significant portion of the town's population depends on this craft for their livelihood, with thousands of artisans engaged in various stages of production. The industry contributes substantially to the local economy and helps preserve traditional skills and cultural identity.

In recent decades, the Sarthebari bell metal industry has faced several challenges, including rising costs of raw materials, competition from machine-made metal products, and changing consumer preferences. These factors have affected the income and sustainability of traditional artisans, leading to concerns about the future of the craft. Efforts are ongoing to support artisans through training, design innovation, and market access.

== Recognition ==
In 2024, the Sarthebari metal craft received Geographical Indication (GI) tag recognition from the Government of India, safeguarding its identity and traditional knowledge. The GI tag is expected to enhance the craft's visibility, protect it from imitation products, and support artisan communities by promoting their work nationally and internationally. This recognition aims to protect the craft from imitation, promote its cultural heritage, and enhance opportunities for artisans in national and international markets.

== Gallery ==
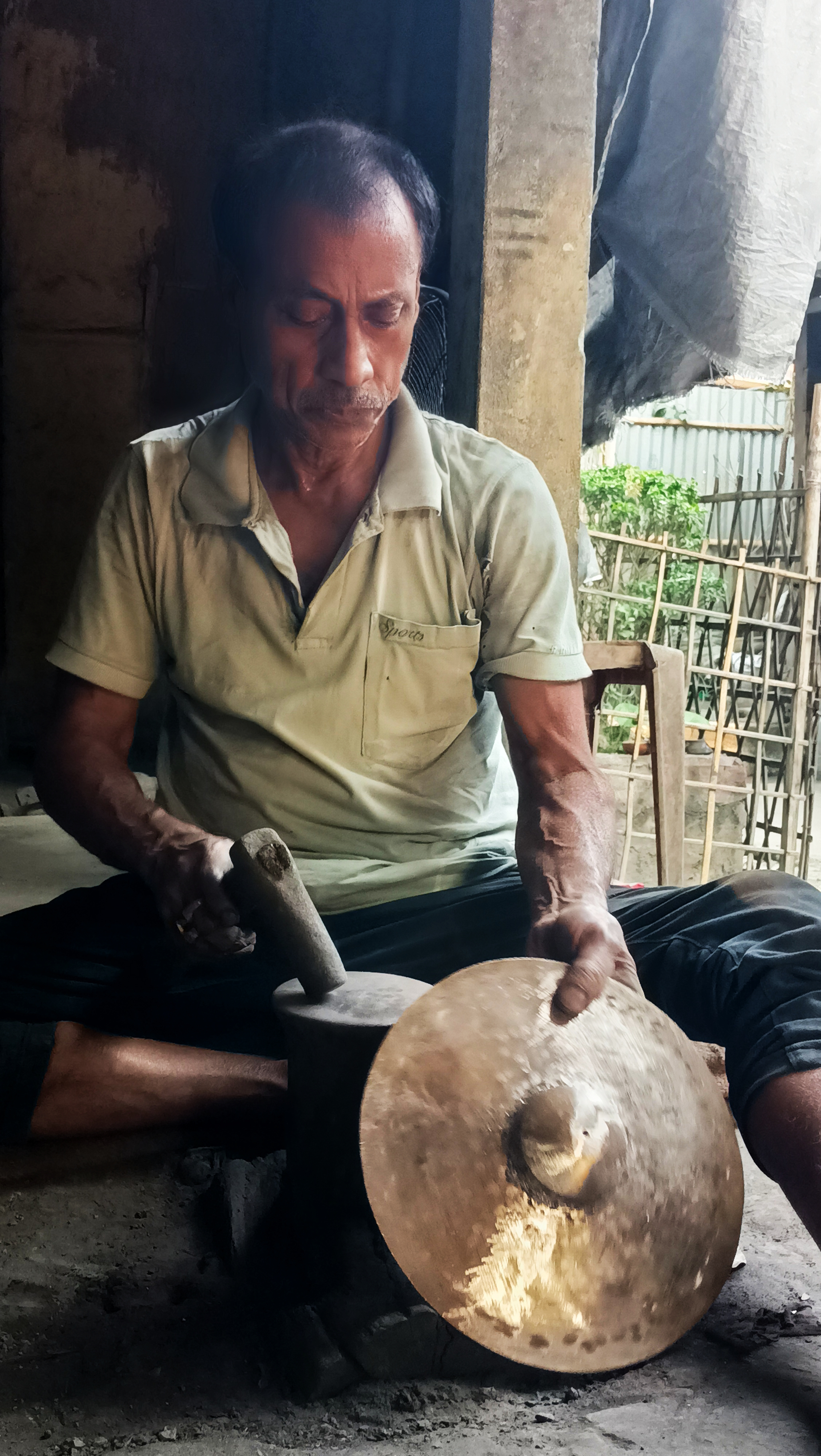
Bell-metal worker working in his mill

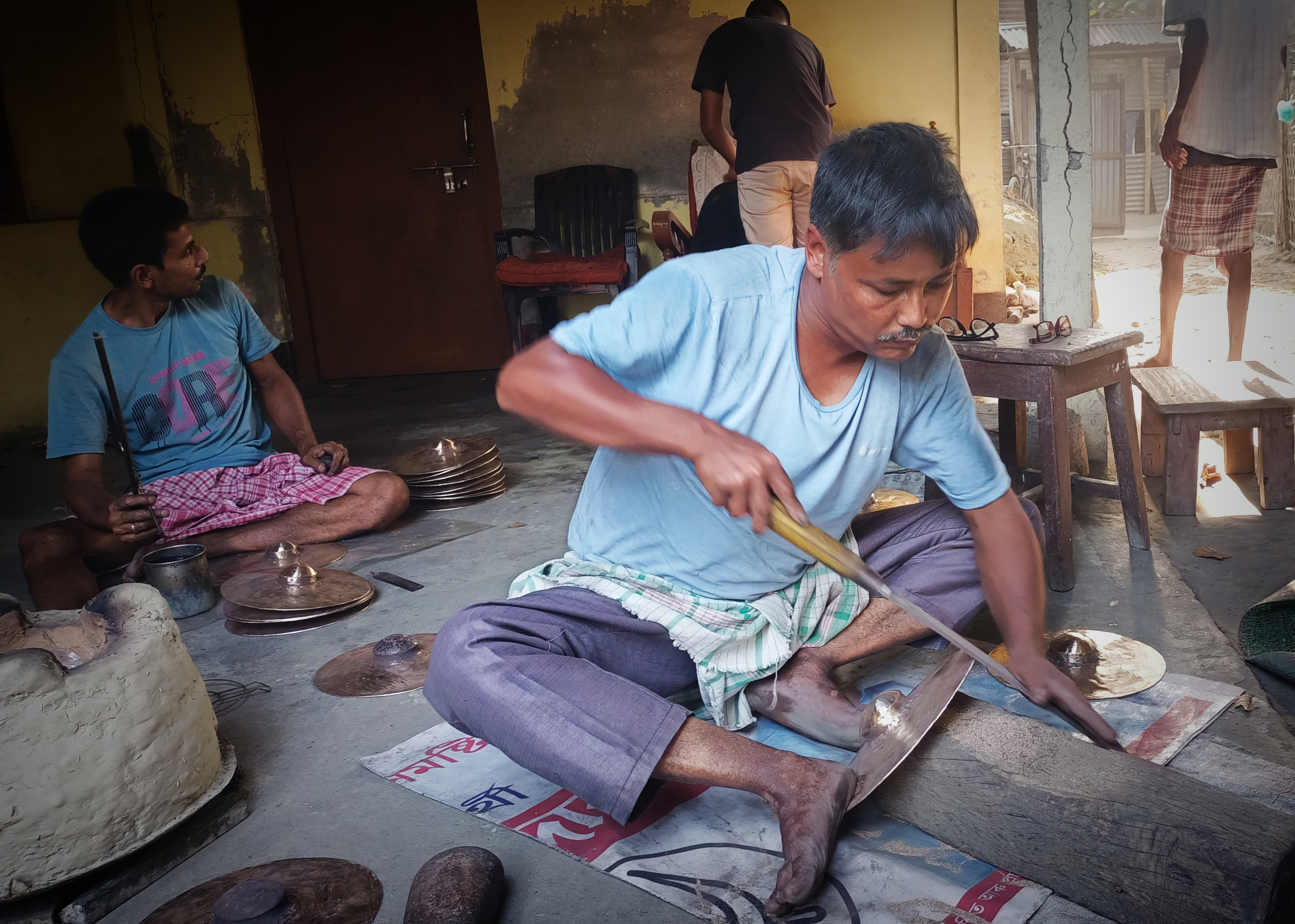
Kohar, the bell metal artist

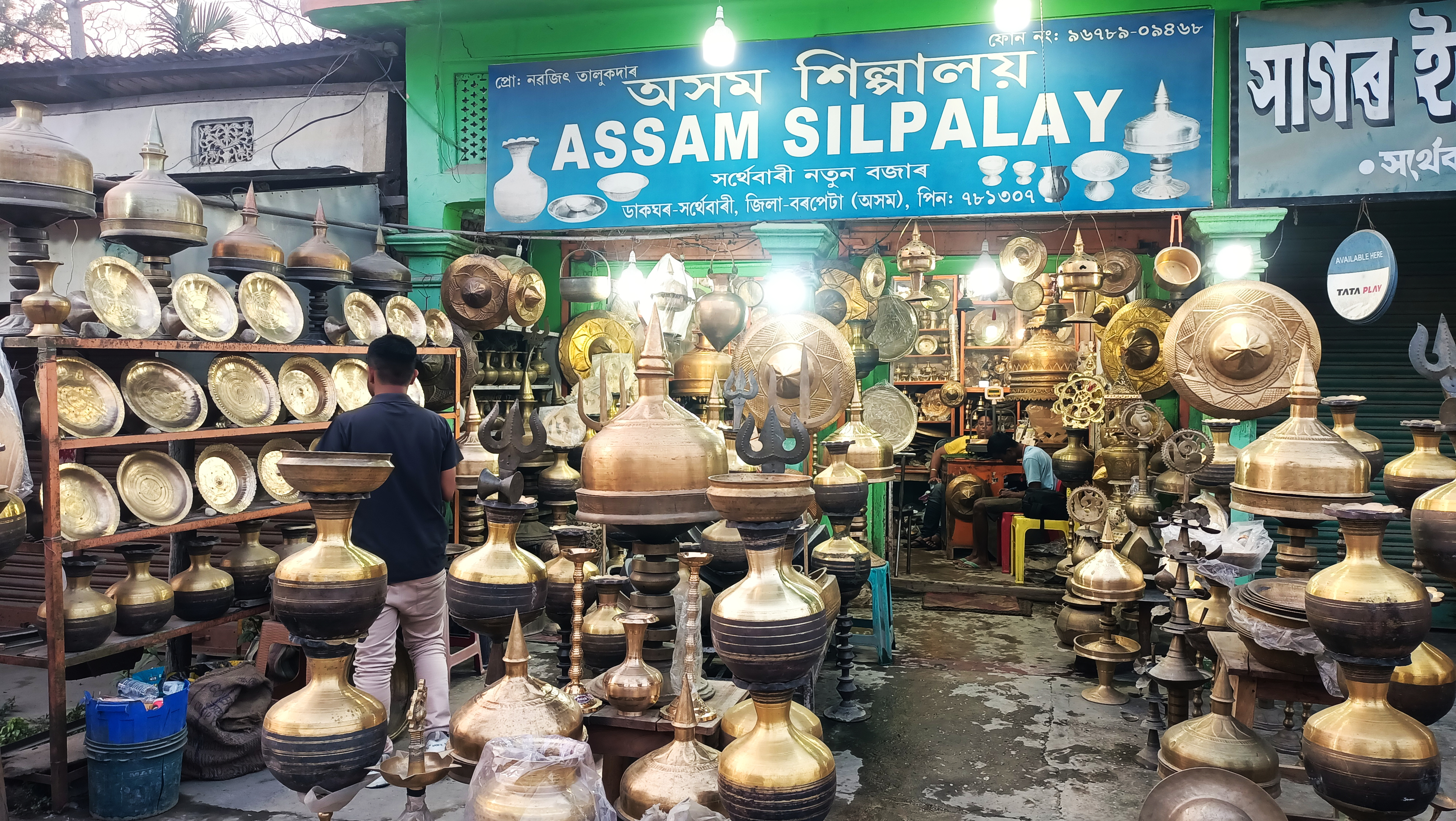
Shops of bell metal utensils at Sarthebari

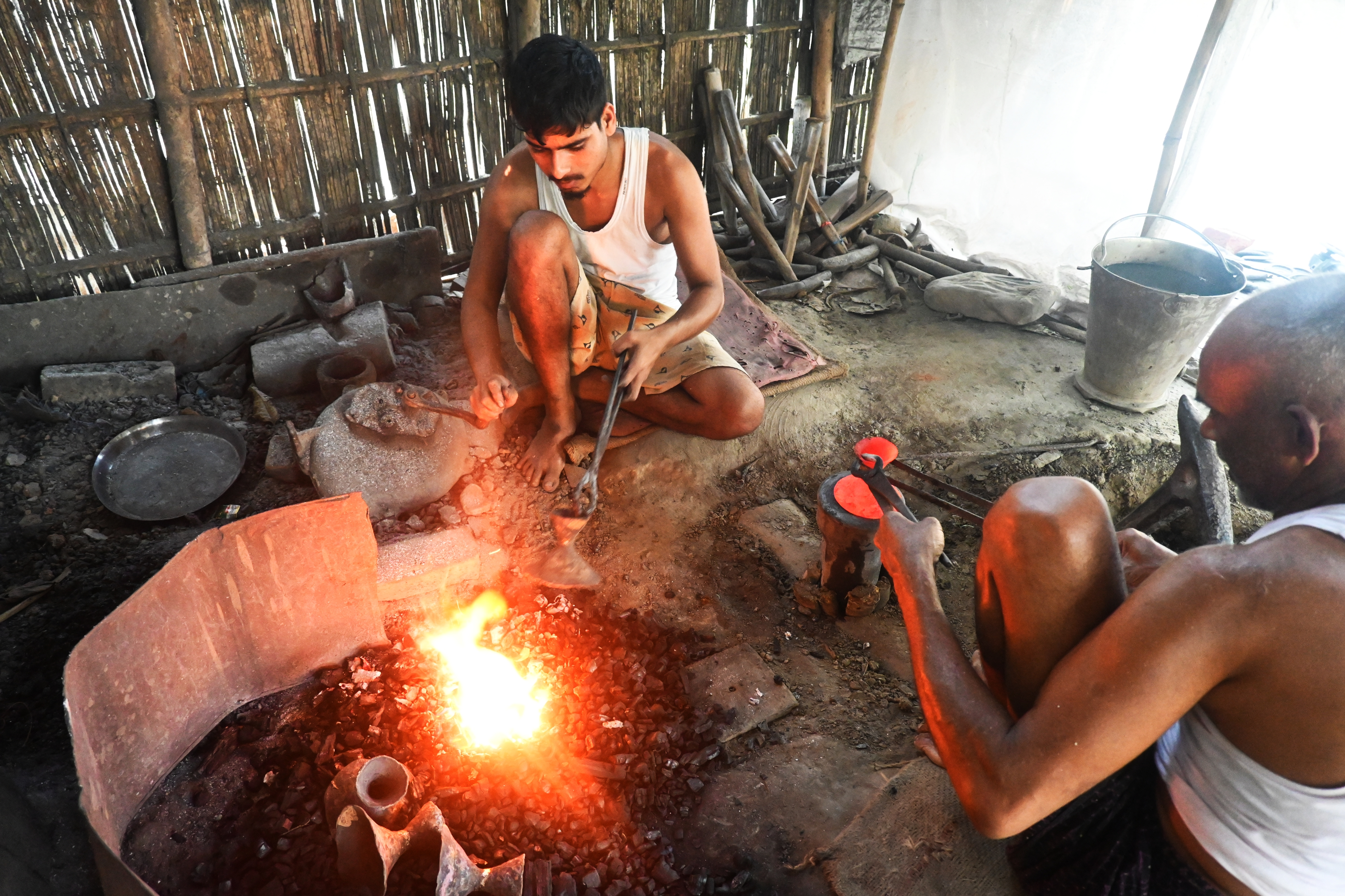
Work station of Bell-metal worker
