= Assamese =

Assamese may refer to:

- Assamese people, a socio-ethnolinguistic identity of north-eastern India
- People of Assam, multi-ethnic, multi-linguistic and multi-religious people of Assam
- Assamese language, the traditional variant of one of the easternmost Indo-Aryan languages
- Assamese script, a traditional writing system of the Assamese language
- Assamese alphabet, a variant of the Bengali script, currently used as the standard writing system for Assamese, introduced in the 19th century
- Culture of Assam, the culture of Assamese people
- Assamese cuisine, a style of cooking
- Assam tea, a black tea
- Assam silk, three types of indigenous wild silk

== See also ==
- Asamiya (disambiguation)
- Assam (disambiguation)
