= Xorai =

Traditional symbols of Assam

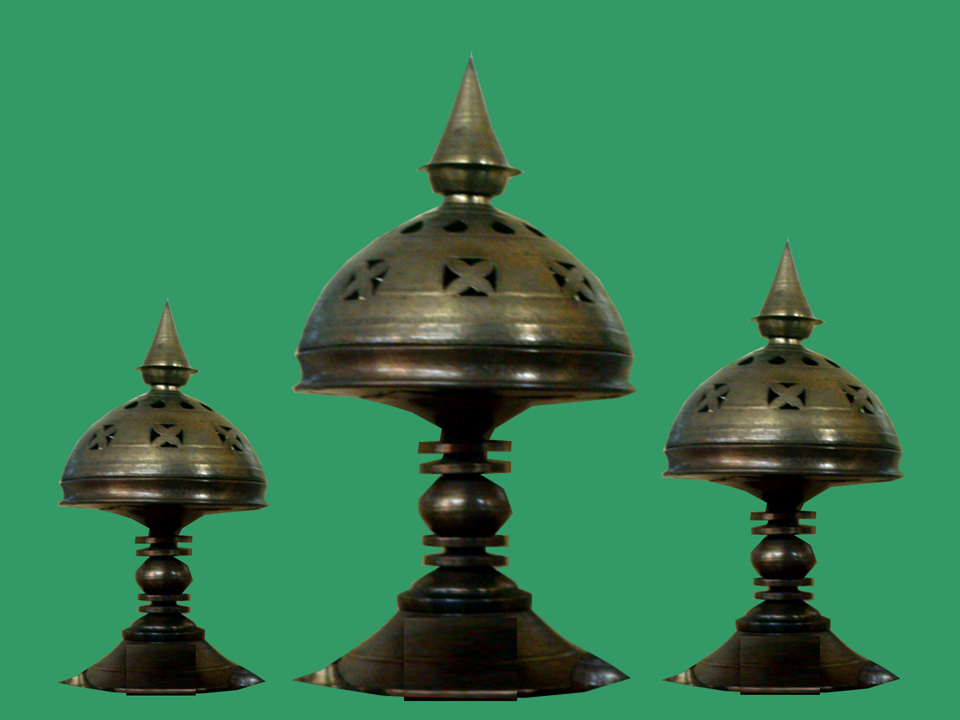
A set of Xorais on display

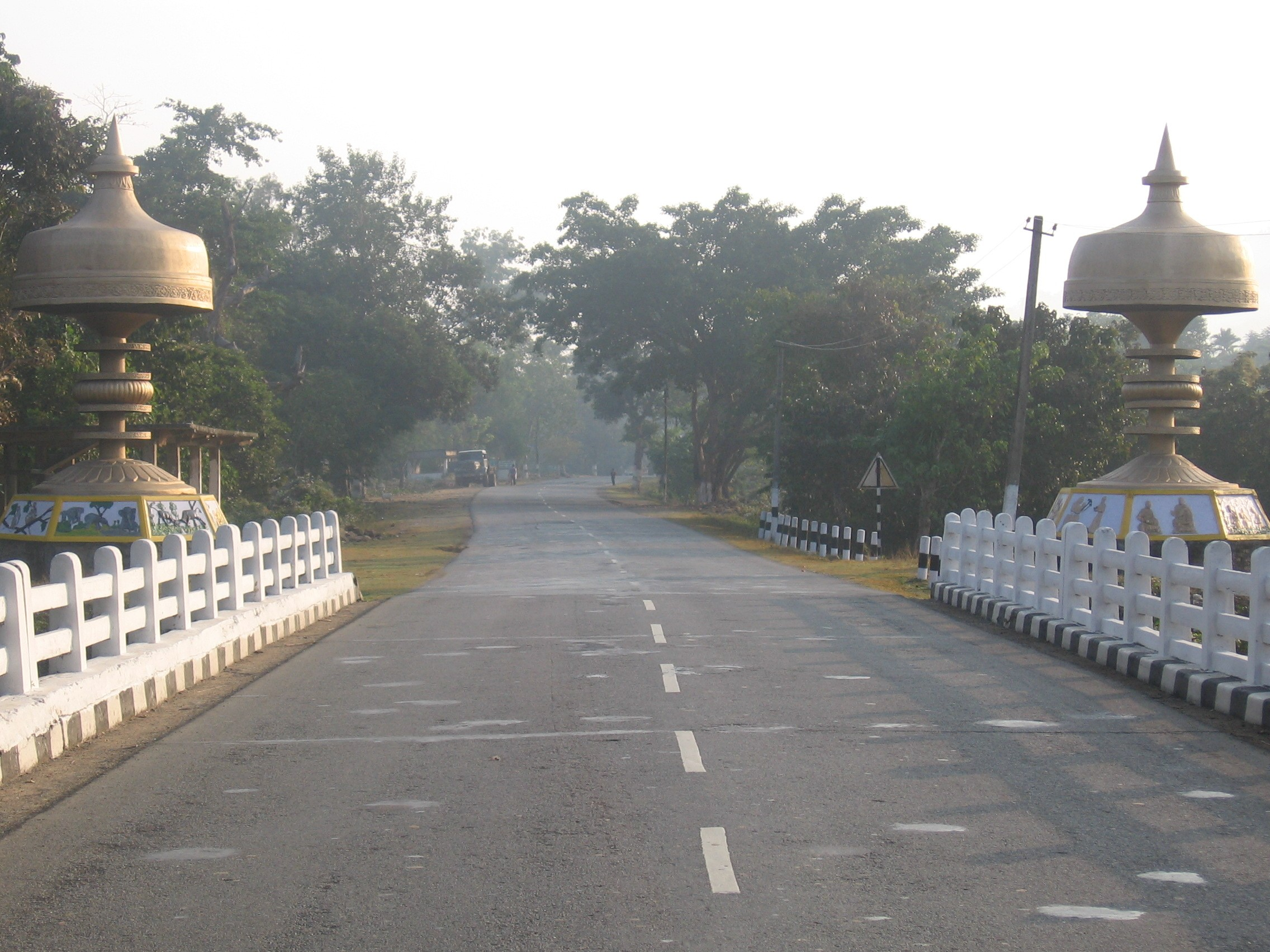
Two extra large Xorais being used by the roadside welcoming visitors to Kaziranga National Park

The Xorai (Assamese pronunciation: [xɔɹaɪ]), a manufactured bell metal product is one of the traditional symbols of Assam, which is considered as an article of great respect by the people of Assam. In simplistic terms it is an offering tray with a stand at the bottom which is used in felicitations also. There are Xorais with or without a cover on the top. Hajo and Sarthebari are the most important centers of traditional bell-metal and brass crafts in Assam.

== Usage ==
- As an offering tray for tamul-pan (betel nuts and betel leaves) to guests as a sign of welcome and thanks.
- As an offering tray for food and other items placed in front of the altar (naamghar) for blessing by the Lord.
- As a decorative symbol in traditional functions such as during Bihu dances (modern usage)
- As a gift to a person of honour during felicitations (modern usage)

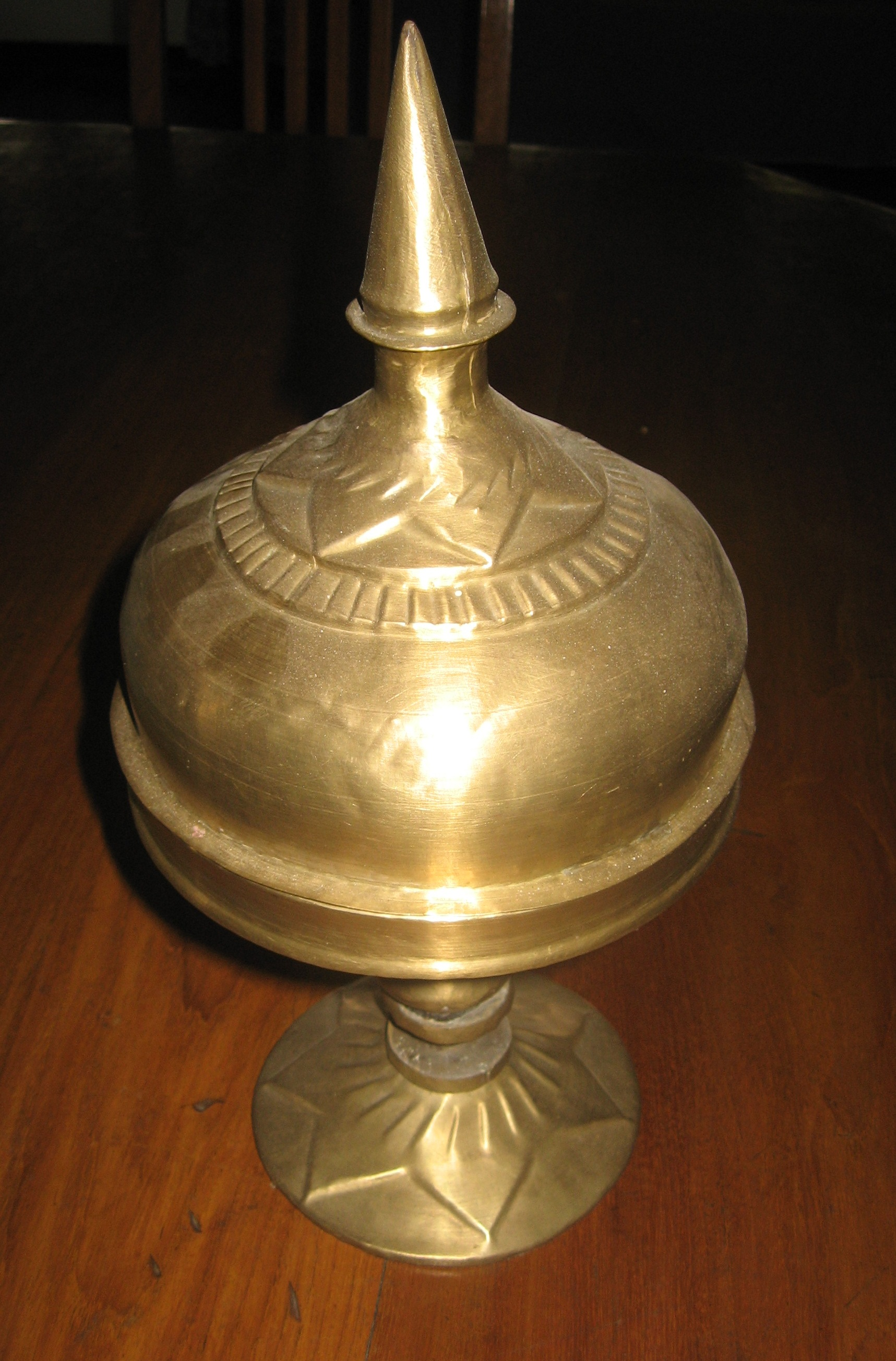
Xorai

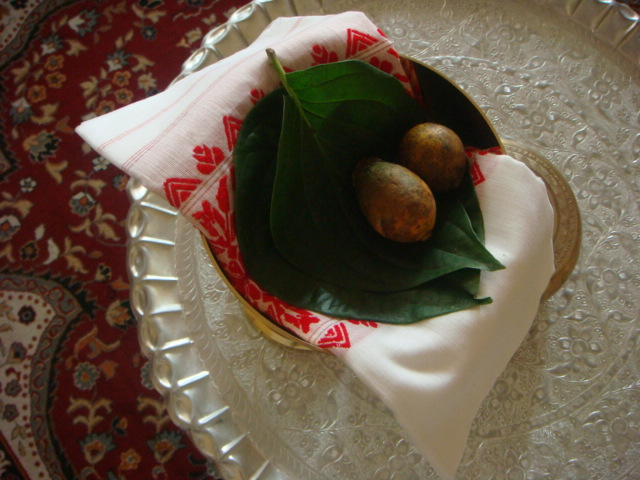
Xorai with Gamosa, Tamul and Paan, a tradition in Assam

== See also ==
- Culture of Assam
- Bell and brass metal crafts of Assam
- Traditional crafts of Assam
- Tamol in Assamese Culture
