= Asamiya =

Asamiya may refer to:

- Assamese language, an Indo-Aryan language of Assam, India
  - Assamese people, an ethnic-group from Assam, India
- Kia Asamiya, Japanese manga artist
- Athena Asamiya, a fictional character

== See also ==
- Assamese (disambiguation)
- Asamia, a genus of beetles
- Assamia, a genus of harvestmen in the family Assamiidae
