= Gamosa =

Woven rectangular textile of Assam, India

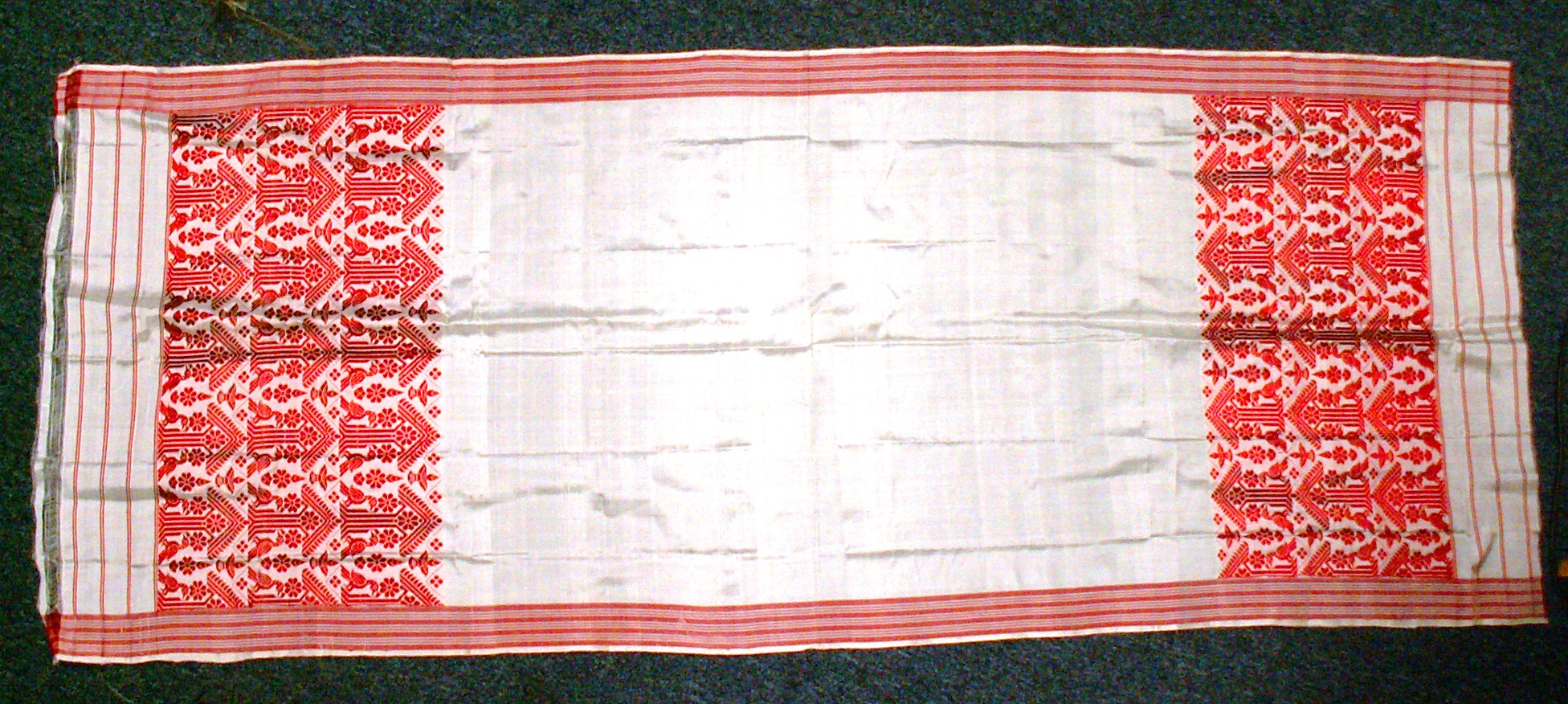
A Gamusa made from Pat silk with intricate designs.

The Gamosa of Assam is an article of significance for the people of Assam, India. It is generally a white rectangular piece of cloth with primarily a red border on three sides and red woven motifs on the fourth (in addition to red, other colors are also used). Although cotton yarn is the most common material for making/weaving gamosas, there are special occasion ones made from Pat silk.

A 1,455.3 meter long Gamusa displayed in Delhi created world record as it became the world's longest hand woven piece of cloth.

== Origin of the name ==
Literally translated, it means 'something to wipe the body with' (Ga=body, musa=to wipe) however, interpreting the word gamosa as the towel is misleading. The word gamosa is derived from the Kamrupi word gamsaw, the cloth used to cover the Bhagavad Purana at the altar.

== Usage ==
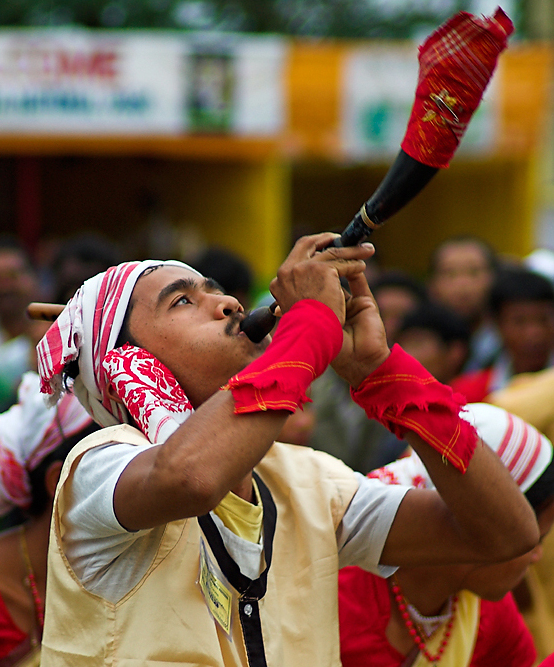
Bihu dancer wearing a Gamosa around the head

Though it is used as a turban or scarf, the use is not restricted to this.

- It is used to cover the altar at the prayer hall or cover the scriptures. An object of reverence is never placed on the bare ground, but always on a gamusa.
- It is used by the farmer, fishermen or hunter as a waistcloth (tongali) or a loincloth (suriya).
- A Bihu dancer wraps it around the head with a fluffy knot (see picture).
- It is hung around the neck at the prayer hall (naamghar) and was thrown over the shoulder in the past to signify social status.
- Guests are welcomed with the offering of a gamusa and tamul (betel nut) and elders are offered gamusas (referred to as bihuwaan in this case) during Bihu.
- It may be used as a towel to wipe the body after a bath (an act of purification).

One can therefore, very well say, that the gamusa symbolizes the indigenous life and culture of Assam.

== Cultural significance ==
Significantly the gamusa is used equally by all irrespective of religious and ethnic backgrounds.

Like gamusa, there are other woven symbolic clothes with graphic designs used by distinct cultural sub-systems and ethno-cultural groups as well.

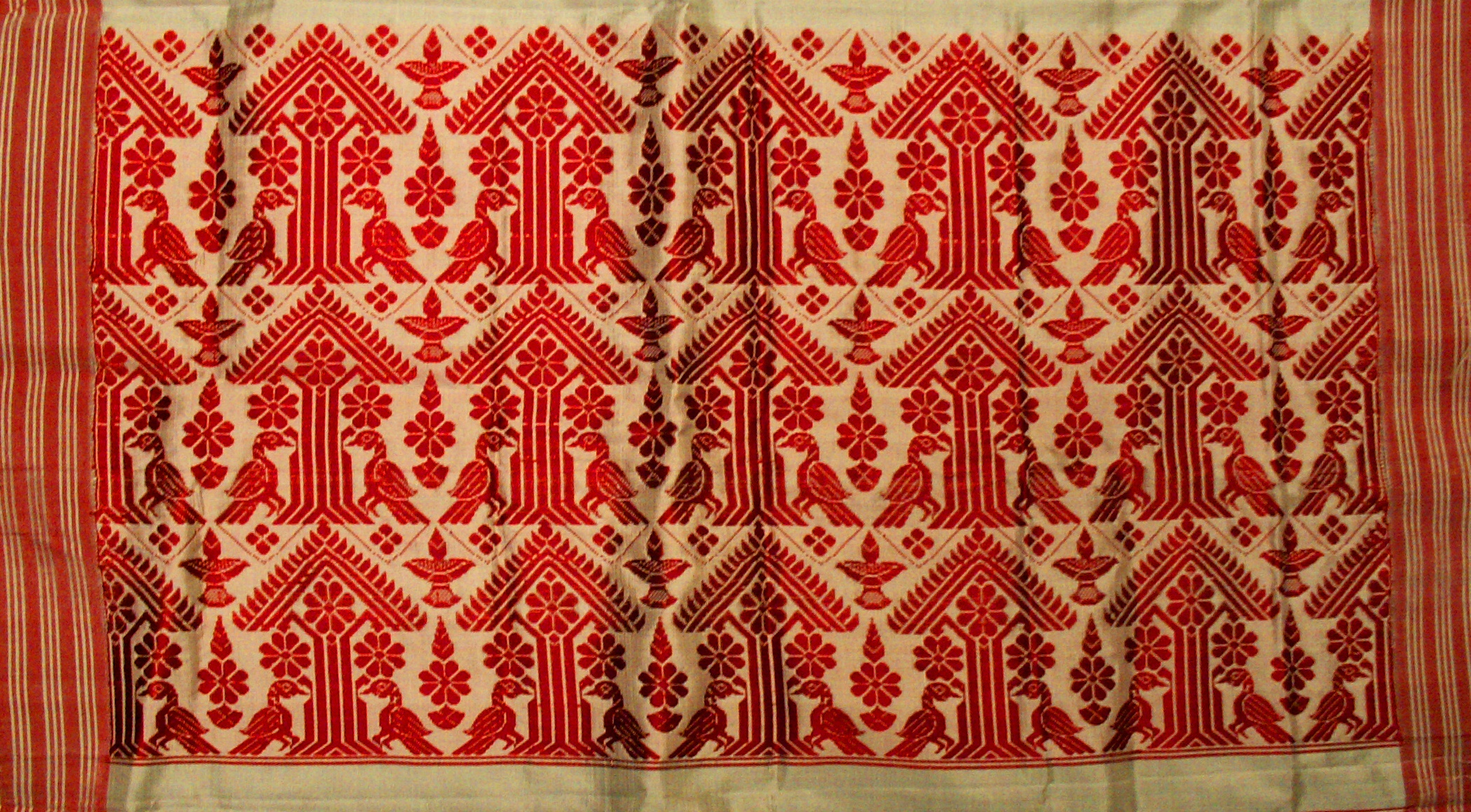
A Gamusa border with a traditional handwoven motif called goxa

There were various other symbolic elements and designs traditionally in use, which are now only found in literature, art, sculpture, architecture, etc. or used for only religious purposes (in particular occasions only). The typical designs of Assamese-lion, dragon, flying-lion, etc. were used for symbolizing various purposes and occasions.

On December 13 of 2022, Gamosa of Assam received the Geographical Indication tag.

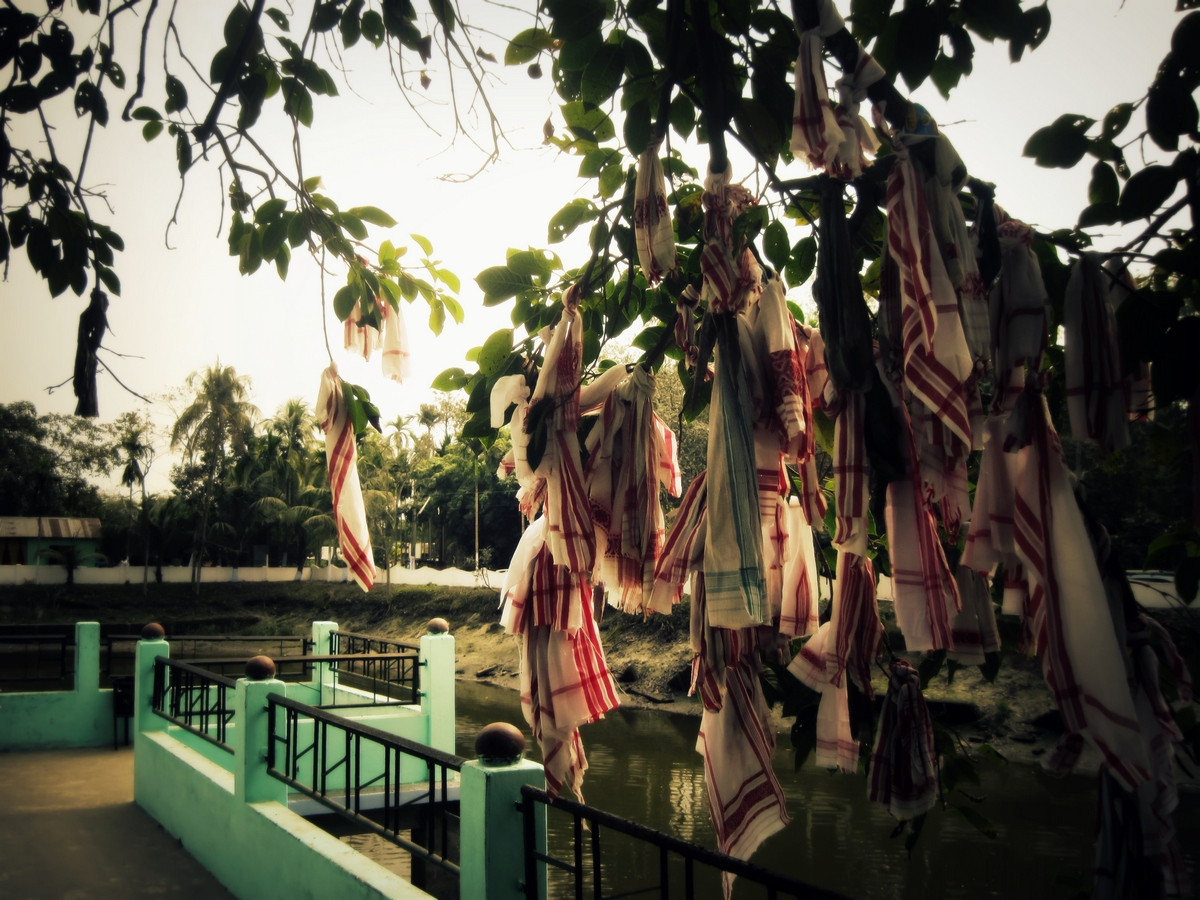
Gamosas hanging on a tree

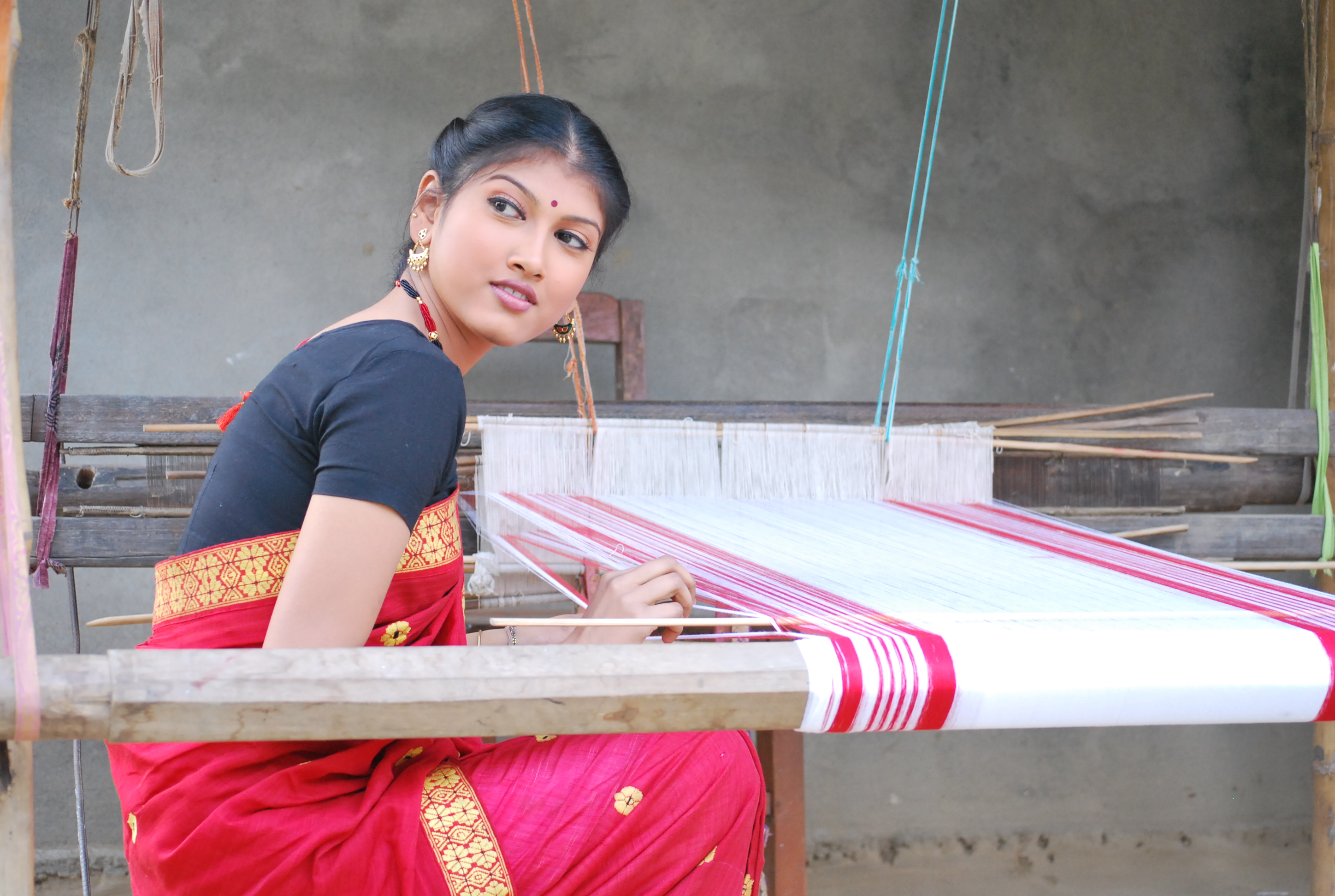
A woman seen traditionally weaving a Gamosa

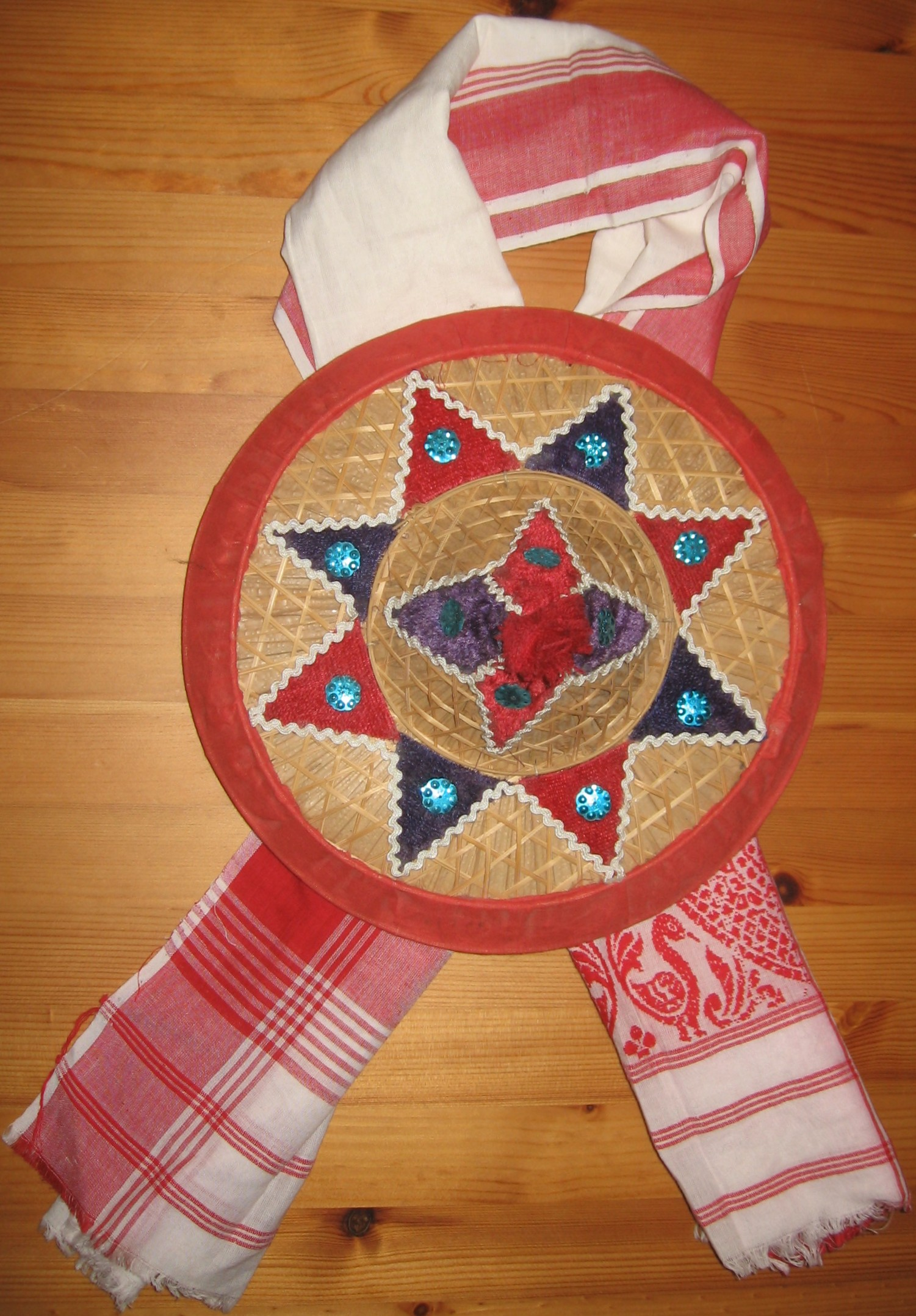
Jaapi with Gamosa

== See also ==
- Jaapi
- Mekhela chador
- Textiles and dresses of Assam
- Xorai
- Namghar
