= Kamrupi crafts =

Brass and Bell metal products of Kamrupi are famous for their beauty and strength of form and utility. Brass is an important cottage industry, while Sarthebari is well known for its bell metal craft. The items of brass are the kalah (water pot), sarai (a platter or tray mounted on a base), kahi (dish), bati (bowl), lota (water pot with a long neck) and tal (cymbals). Silver and copper too have formed part of traditional metalcraft in Kamrupi, and the State Museum in Guwahati has a huge collection of items made of these metals.

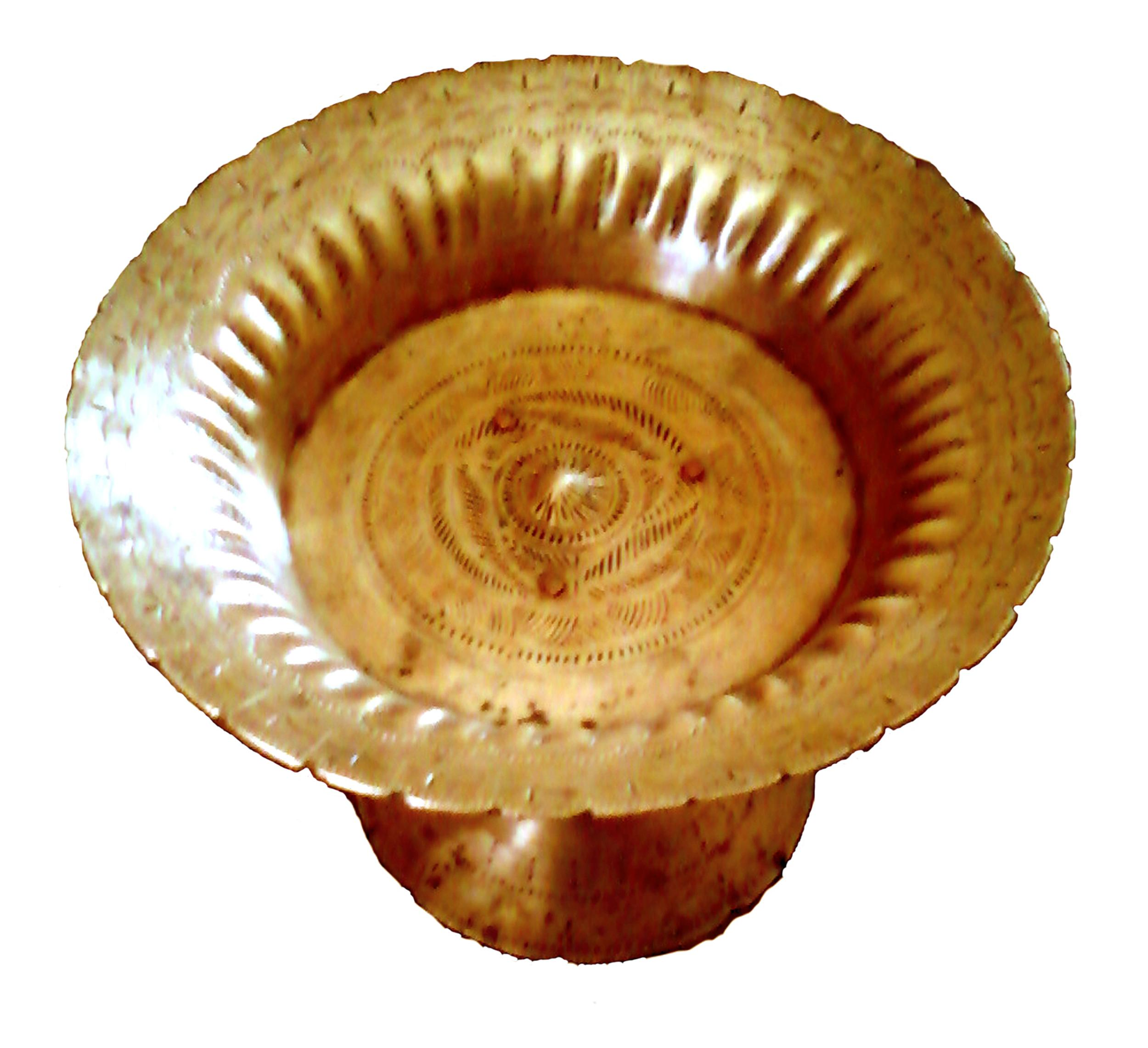
Bell Metal product from Kamrup

== See also ==
- Kamrupi silk
