= Assam (disambiguation) =

Assam is a state in northeastern India.

Assam may also refer to:

== Historical places ==
- Kingdom of Assam, the Ahom Kingdom, as it was known in medieval times
- Colonial Assam, a period of time between (1826–1947) when Assam was under British colonial rule
  - Eastern Bengal and Assam, a province of British India between (1905–1912)
  - Assam Province, a province of British India between (1912–1947)
- Assam (1947–1963)

== Other uses ==
- Assam Circuit, a Hindi film distribution circuit in Assam
- Assam Company, the British company that administered Colonial Assam in the 19th century
- Assam Oil, a division of Oil India Company
- Assam Rifles, a paramilitary force in India
- Assam Regiment, an army regiment in India
- Assam silk, the silks that are produced in Assam
- Assam tea, the tea that is produced in Assam
- S.S. Assam, a steamer shipwrecked in June 1842
- A character from Girls und Panzer

== See also ==
- ASAM (disambiguation)
- Assamese (disambiguation)
