= Asam (surname) =

Asam is a surname. Notable people with the surname include:

- Cosmas Damian Asam (1686–1739), German Baroque painter and architect, one of the Asam brothers
- Egid Quirin Asam (1692–1750), German Baroque plasterer and sculptor, one of the Asam brothers
- Liesbeth Mau Asam (born 1982), Dutch short-track speed skater
- Werner Asam (1944–2026), German actor and director
