= Asamia =

Scientific classification
- Kingdom: Animalia
- Phylum: Arthropoda
- Class: Insecta
- Order: Coleoptera
- Suborder: Polyphaga
- Infraorder: Elateriformia
- Family: Buprestidae
- Genus: Asamia; Thery, 1909

Genus of beetles

Asamia is a genus of beetles in the family Buprestidae, containing the following species:

- Asamia insolita Thery, 1909
- Asamia pulcherrima (Obst, 1903)
