= ʽAsam =

`Asam
- Interactive map of `Asam
- Coordinates: 16°08′21″N 49°21′08″E
- Country: Yemen
- Governorate: Hadramaut
- Time zone: UTC+3 (Yemen Standard Time)

`Asam is a village in eastern Yemen. It is located in the Hadhramaut Governorate.
