= Bohuwa dance =

Bohuwa Dance
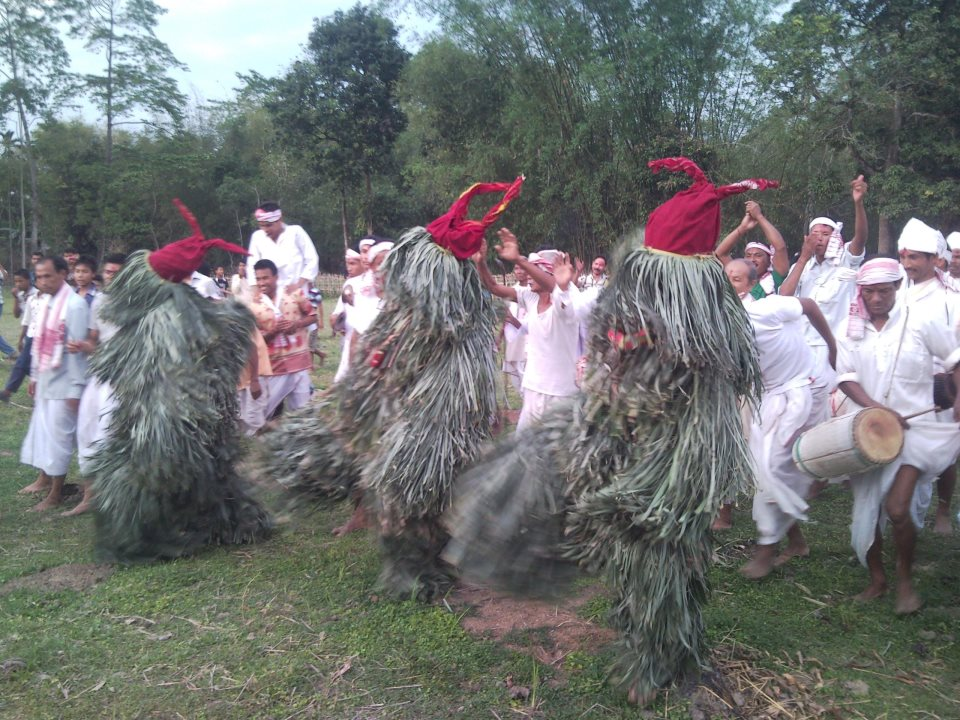
- Origin: Assam, India

Bohuwa Dance is a traditional event of the Sonowal Kacharis. This event is celebrated by Sonowal Kacharis every two years in Dibrugarh, Assam.

== Origination ==
The Bohua dance has ancient origins. It is known that Lord Shiva or Khring Raja Baithow is the main God of the Sonowal Kacharis. It is mentioned in the Bhagavad and other Puranic texts that Daksha, the son of Lord Brahma, was the king of Tribhuvan. Daksha's youngest daughter Sati, who Daksha was very fond of, fell in love with Lord Shiva when she was a teenager. However, King Daksha didn't want to give his dear daughter's hand to Lord Shiva, who had no wealth, was always nude, and whose companions were ghosts and demons. Lord Brahma intervened and ordered Daksha to marry his daughter to Lord Shiva and Daksha obeyed. One day Shiva went to visit Daksha along with other guests. When Daksha came to see them everyone except Shiva greeted him! Angered by his dishonor, Daksha promised to take revenge upon Shiva himself. One day Daksha decided to organize a Mahayajna only to take revenge upon Shiva. He invited Yamraj, all the demigods and even the kings and queens. Everyone except lord Shiva was invited. When Shiva and Sati learned of this, she desired to visit her father's Mahayajna. After much reluctance Shiva let her go. But when she reached her father's house, Dakshya ridiculed her in front of everyone. Unable to bear this ridicule from her father, Sati left her body on the Mahajagya. When this news reached Kailash, ghosts and demons appeared on the yajna to vandalize it. When Lord Shiva arrived, a drop of sweat from his forehead fell on the ground and a warrior named Birbharda was created. This fearless warrior with the order of Shiva beheaded Dakshya! After this incident, the wife of King Dakshya came crying to Shiva and begged him to restore her husband's life. The powerful Lord Shiva then put the head of a sacrificed goat in Dakshya's body and lo! He was alive again! After his resurrection, the king and his queen danced in joy. Everyone praised the mighty Lord Shiva for his divine powers. The Sonowal Kacharis therefore performed the Bohua dance in praise of Lord Shiva. This dance signifies the beginning of a new life, a clean society, and the riddance of bad omen. In this way the Bohua dance has been performed for many generations.
