= Bell metal =

Bronze alloy

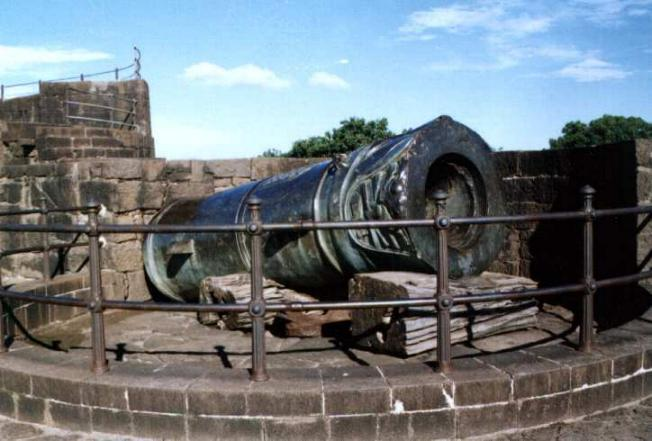
Cannon made of bell metal at Malik-e-Maidan, Bijapur, India.

Bell metal or bell bronze is an alloy used for making bells and related instruments, such as cymbals. It is a form of bronze with a higher tin content than most other bronzes, usually in approximately a 4:1 ratio of copper to tin (typically, 78% copper, 22% tin by mass). The higher tin content increases the rigidity of the metal, and increases the resonance. Historically, it was preferred for early cannons. Today, it also has industrial uses, being specified for valve bodies, piston rings, bearings, and bushings.

== Metallurgy ==
Tin and copper are relatively soft metals that will deform on striking (though tin to a lesser extent than copper), but alloying the two creates bronze, which is harder and less ductile and also one with more elasticity than either of the two original metals. This metal combination produces a tough, long-wearing material that is resistant to oxidation and subject only to an initial surface weathering. Verdigris forms a protective patina on the surface of bells which coats and protects them against further oxidation. Specifically, it is the combination of low internal damping and low internal sound velocity that makes bell metal specially suitable for resonant percussion instruments.

== Usage ==
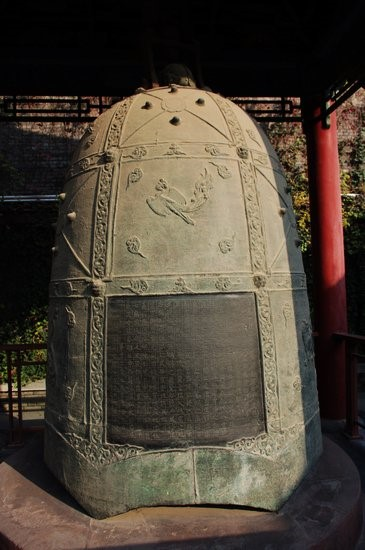
The Jingyun bell, cast in 711, weighing 6,500 kg, originally from the bell tower at the Tang dynasty capital Chang'an

=== Bells ===
Most commonly, as per its colloquial name, bell metal has been and is used for the casting of high-quality bells. The metal used is a high-tin alloy of copper and tin with approximately a 4:1 ratio of copper to tin (78% copper, 22% tin). This is a much higher tin component than that used, for example, in statuary bronze.

The range of percentages of tin content can vary from 20% to 26%, depending on the founder who has arrived empirically at their own alloy ratio. It has been found that increasing the tin content increases the decay time of the bell strike, thus making the bell more sonorous. Taking into consideration overall properties, such as tensile strength, hardness, wear resistance, cast quality, sound, and cost, the optimum alloy can probably be obtained by having a type bronze composition as: ~20wt.% tin, < 2wt.% nickel, < 1.5wt.% lead, ~0.01wt.% phosphorus, < 1wt.% antimony, with balance of copper. Bell metal in this range of ratios has been used for more than 3,000 years and is known for its resonance and "attractive sound." The crystal lattice formation of this alloy is able to absorb high-impact energies, such as from a bell clapper, without distortion, which is the case when the bell is struck. This results in a resonant sound and causes the bell to vibrate strongly in a complex nodal system.

In Russia, church bells are commonly cast with a unique mixture of copper and tin, often with silver added, to produce their unique sonority and resonance, mastered early in Russian Christian history.

A similar alloy is employed for the gongs, saron, demung, and numerous other struck metallophones of the Indonesian gamelan ensembles. In this case the tin:copper ratio is traditionally given as 3:10 by weight. Whereas bells are cast and then left to cool, the metal of Indonesian gongs and metallophones is cast as rough blanks which are then hot-forged to their final shape with hammers.

=== Cannons ===
Bell metal was used to cast many early Spanish, Portuguese and "Malay" (Note: a dated misleading term which refers geographically to the region spanning from the Thailand Peninsula through to the Philippines) cannons, most notably the Malay cannon known erroneously as Rentaka. (Note: a colloquial term, the correct term is meriam or durbus) In Java, bell metal mixtures including tin were also used for the manufacture of figurines, objets d'art, sculptures and household goods for the wealthy. This material was also adopted by the Javanese-influenced cultures of Thailand, Khmer and Myanmar. Bell metal is particularly prized for its excellent sonorous qualities, also found in bell metal cannons which produce a distinct, loud ring when fired.

The Javanese lantaka was first cast in bell metal under an Empu of the early Majapahit Empire and spread into the surrounding islands of the Nusantara, Javanese skill in gunsmithing and cannon-founding affording military dominance over the surrounding area. Later, disaffected smiths and noble entourages emigrating from Java brought these cannon-founding skill to Philippines, Brunei, Malaysia and Myanmar. When Ternate was captured by the Spanish, they were astounded to find over 3,000 very finely cast bell metal cannons in the walled compound, although humorously to the Spaniards these were tied upright to veranda poles, used as lingam household decorations rather than weapons. The Spanish and Portuguese were equally astounded to find their European bronze cannon offerings to the Javanese rejected as inferior in quality, as they rightly were.

After the Dutch victories, Javanese-smithed cannons of Makassar, Ternate, and the surrounding islands were taken as reparations, considered by the Dutch as made of bronze superior to their own, and subsequently melted down and recast in Dutch standard calibres and bores.

Culturally, Javanese bronze cannons and their regional derivatives were traditionally part of a dowry, and offering a poor-quality cast bronze cannon was a supreme insult. Brunei and Malaysia retain the tradition of a token cannon as a dowry for weddings, and many celebrations are opened with a celebratory shot.

=== Utensils ===
In India, in the state of Assam, it is called kanh while in West Bengal and Odisha, kansa, it is called Kanchu in Kannada and is used for cooking and eating utensils. Sarthebari in Barpeta district of Assam holds a unique place in the production of kanh utensils. In Assam, utensils of kanh have many religious uses and the most unusual utensils, bata and banbati, are used to give offerings and puja or to show respect to honored guests and dignitaries. Belaguntha in Ganjam district, Kantilo in Nayagarh, and Balakati near Bhubaneswar are well known for this craft in Odisha. In the state of Kerala, urulis (odu vessels) bring back memories of chakka varatti (jackfruit halva). In summer when jackfruits are available aplenty, huge quantities of chakka varatti would be made in the backyard over a log fire and consumed in a trice, the richness of fruits, jaggery and ghee. Urulis are made from bell metal. Vengalai panai (also made from a kind of bell metal) is synonymous with a Tamil bride's first pongal when freshly harvested rice is offered to the sun god with turmeric and sugarcane.
