= Sarthebari =

- Town
- Nickname: Sarthebari town
- Location in Assam, India Sarthebari (India)
- Coordinates: 26.35°N 91.22°E
- Country: India
- State: Assam
- District: Barpeta
- Established: 1955

Government
  - Body: Sarthebari Town Committee

Population (2001)
  - Total: 7,545

Languages
  - Official: Assamese
- Time zone: UTC+5:30 (IST)
- PIN: 781307
- ISO 3166 code: IN-AS
- Vehicle registration: AS

Sarthebari (IPA:ˌsɑ:θəˈbɑ:rɪ) is a town and a town area committee in Barpeta district in the Indian state of Assam. Sarthebari is home to the Sarthebari Bell Metal Craft, the second largest handicraft of assam after bamboo craft. The nearby villages are Amrikhowa, Panchagram (Lachima, Baniyakuchi, Bengapara, Halodhibari, Kamarpara), Byaskuchi, Panagaortop, Namsala, Gomura, Karakuchi etc.

== Demographics ==
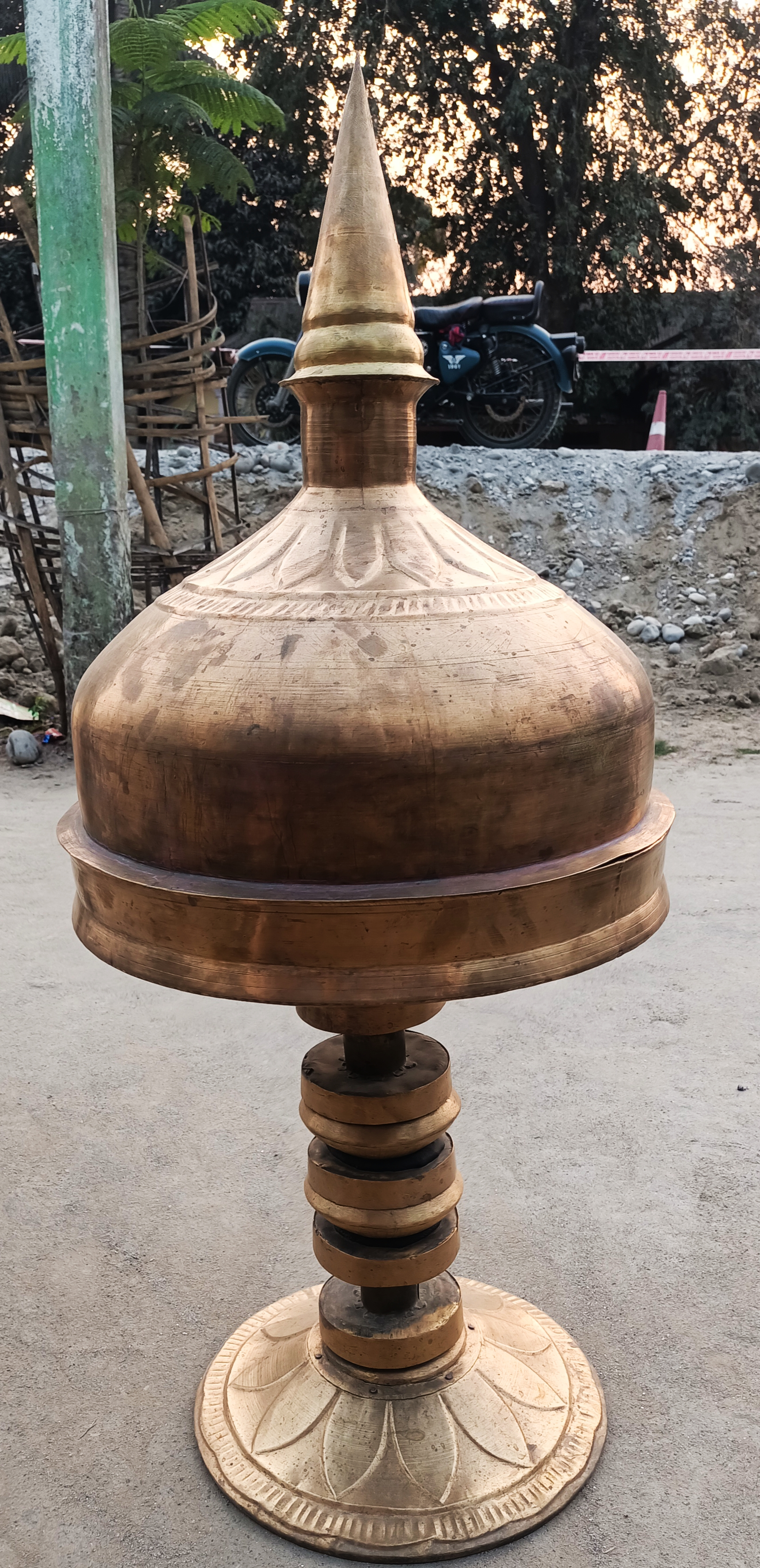
The xorai made at Sarthebari, Assam

As of 2001 India census, Sarthebari had a population of 7545. Males constitute 51% of the population and females 49%. Sarthebari has an average literacy rate of 83%, higher than the national average of 59.5%: male literacy is 88%, and female literacy is 77%. In Sarthebari, 9% of the population is under 6 years of age. Sarthebari is famous for its historic Assamese bellmetal utensils and for traditional Assamese structure called Xorai ( শৰাই ) and many people associates with this institute. Sarthebari was declared a town in 1955. Postal code of Sarthebari is 781307.

Education Sarthebari Higher Secondary School was established in 1940 which is prominent school in the locality. For Girls', there is Sarthebari Girls' High School. For Higher studies Bapuji College is situated there.

== Notable people ==
Tapan Deka, Director, Intelligence Bureau
