= Bihu (disambiguation) =

Bihu are cultural festivals of Assam, India.

Bihu may also refer to:

- Magh Bihu, Assamese folk and harvest festival, part of the broader Indian Makar Sakranti festivals in January
- Bihu dance, a folk dance of the Bihu festivals
- Bihu Songs of Assam, a song book for Bihu festival songs by Prafulladutta Goswami
- Bihu japi or jaapi, a traditional conical hat of Assam
- Bihu Park, Neihu, Taipei, Taiwan
- Li Bihu (born 1946), a Chinese agronomist

== See also ==
- Wende metro station, where the deputy station name is Bihu Park station, a metro station of the Taipei Metro
