= Assamese musical instruments =

This is a list of musical instruments used in traditional music of Assam, India.Folk instruments of Assam

== List ==
Name of instrument	Name in Assamese	Notes
Pepa	পেঁপা	Pepais a wind instrument and has a major role in Assamese music.
Toka	টকা	Toka is an important Assamese musical instrument. It is made up of bamboo.
Gogona	গগণা	Gogona is a popular Assamese instrument. It is made of bamboo which is vibrated to produce sound.
Xutuli	সুতুলি	Xutuli is used by Assamese people.
Banhi	বাঁহী	Banhi or bamboo flute is popular in Assam.
Been	বীন	Been is an old Assamese instrument
Bhortal	ভোঁৰতাল	Bhortal is used in Vaishnavite culture of Assam mostly. It is made up of metal.
Khram	খ্ৰাম	Khram is a long instrument.
Madol	মাডল	Madol is popular in Assam.
Bihutal	বিহুতাল	Bihutal is a small kind of patital. It is made up of metal.
Tokari	টোকাৰী	Tokari is played in Assam very often.।
Xinga	শিঙা	Xinga is a wind instrument
Khol	খোল	Khol is popular in Assamese music. It is a two faced drum, played with hands. It was originally brought from erstwhile Bengal and modified here with the emergence of Vaishnavism.
Doba	ডবা	Dobas are played in namghars. It is a drum beaten usually with sticks or hands. It is also used in assamese bhaona. In ancient times it was used as a communication drum as well as to signify war or occasion.
Mridongo	মৃদঙ্গ	This is a unique traditional percussion instrument which used to be very common in the folk music of Assam played by native ethnic groups along with religious traditions and rites but is now very hard to find except in some selected areas due to emergence of the Khol brought from erstwhile Bengal. The Mridonga of Assam is quite similar to the Khasi Ksing if we compare them. It was considered a holy instrument.
Dogor	ডগৰ	
Dotara	দোতোৰা	Dotara is a stringed instrument and has two strings.
Nagara	নাগাৰা	Nagara is common between Assamese masses. It consists of two drums played together.
Bihu Dhol	ঢোল	Dhol is a two faced drum, played with a stick and a hand. Assamese dhol is comparatively smaller than other dhols but relatively produce loud sound.
Bor Dhol	বৰ ঢোল	It is a large aboriginal log drum played mostly by the Keot(Kaibarta) community of Lower Assam in various indigenous festivals & other occasions producing a deep base tribal sound. It has two sides, one of which is played by hand and the other by a (mari)stick.
Kahlia/Kaila	কালীয়া/কাইলা	It is a pipe (seven holed) instrument producing a high pitch sound. It is almost similar to the Khasi Tangmuri.
Joi Dhol	জয় ঢোল	It is a type of drum played mostly in the undivided Darrang region by the Keot(Kaibarta) ethnic group originally in Shamanistic origin dance and festivals. It has two sides, one of which is played with hand and the other with a stick producing a distinctive sound.
