= Toka (instrument) =

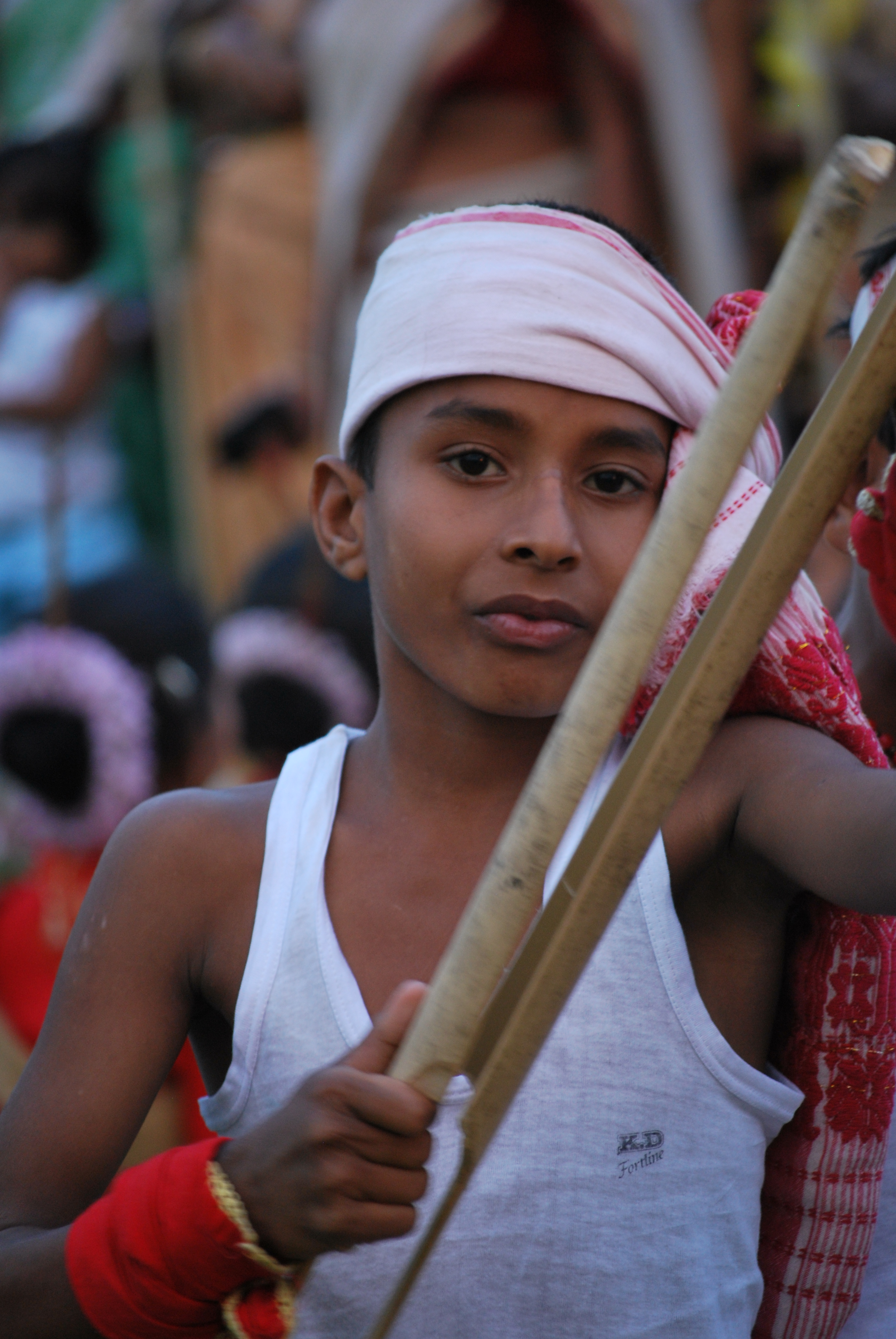

Toka (Assamese: টকা) is a popular and easily available musical instrument used in Assamese folk Music. Toka is made of Bamboo, and bamboo being the most common produce of the forests of Assam, it is used abundantly by Assamese folk musicians. The primary beat of Bihu music was kept by clapping hands, which finally led to development of instruments like toka. Toka is one of the eight musical instruments used in Bihu. The toka used by Bodo tribe of Assam is known as "Thorka".

== See also ==
- Bihu
- Culture of Assam
- Bihu dance
