= Huchori =

Harvest festival of Assam, India

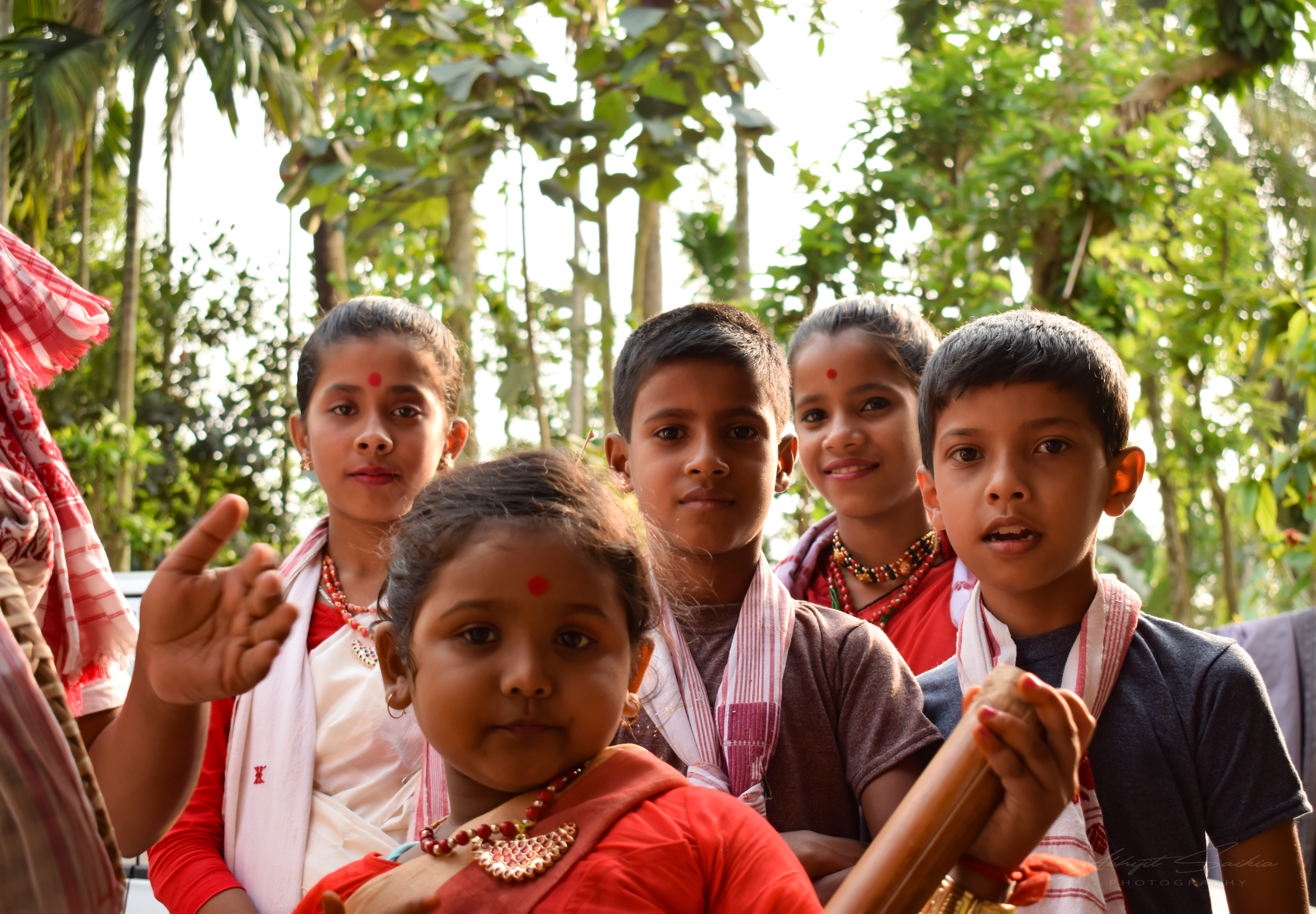
- Nickname: Husori
- Frequency: Annually
- Location: Assam
- Country: India

Huchori is a harvest festival of Assam in India celebrated during Rongali Bihu.

== Description ==
Assam, a north eastern state of India celebrates three Bihus viz. Rangali (Bohag) Bihu in Last day of Sout Month and first week of Bohag Month (Mid April), Kangali (Kati) Bihu in the last day of Aheen Month(Mid October) and Bhogali (Magh) bihu in the last day of Push Month and first week of Magh Month (Mid January). Hisori is a part of Bohag bihu Celebration. The festival takes place on he very first day of Goru Bihu, during nighttime in the courtyard of every house by a group of young men under guidance of elders. They visit the Head man's house first, then there after to every house to bless each family with good health and prosperity and happiness. In return, they get Chelenge Gamocha, a pair of Beatles nut and Beatles leaf, along with a small amount of money as per the status of the family.

== Huchori Dance ==
This is a community dance performed by Husoris, a group of male dancers. The dancers dress up in traditional costumes, wearing colorful turbans, dhotis, and gamochas (traditional towels). They carry musical instruments like the pepa (horn), taal (cymbals), and dhol (drum), and sing folk songs as they dance from one house to another, spreading joy and festive spirit.

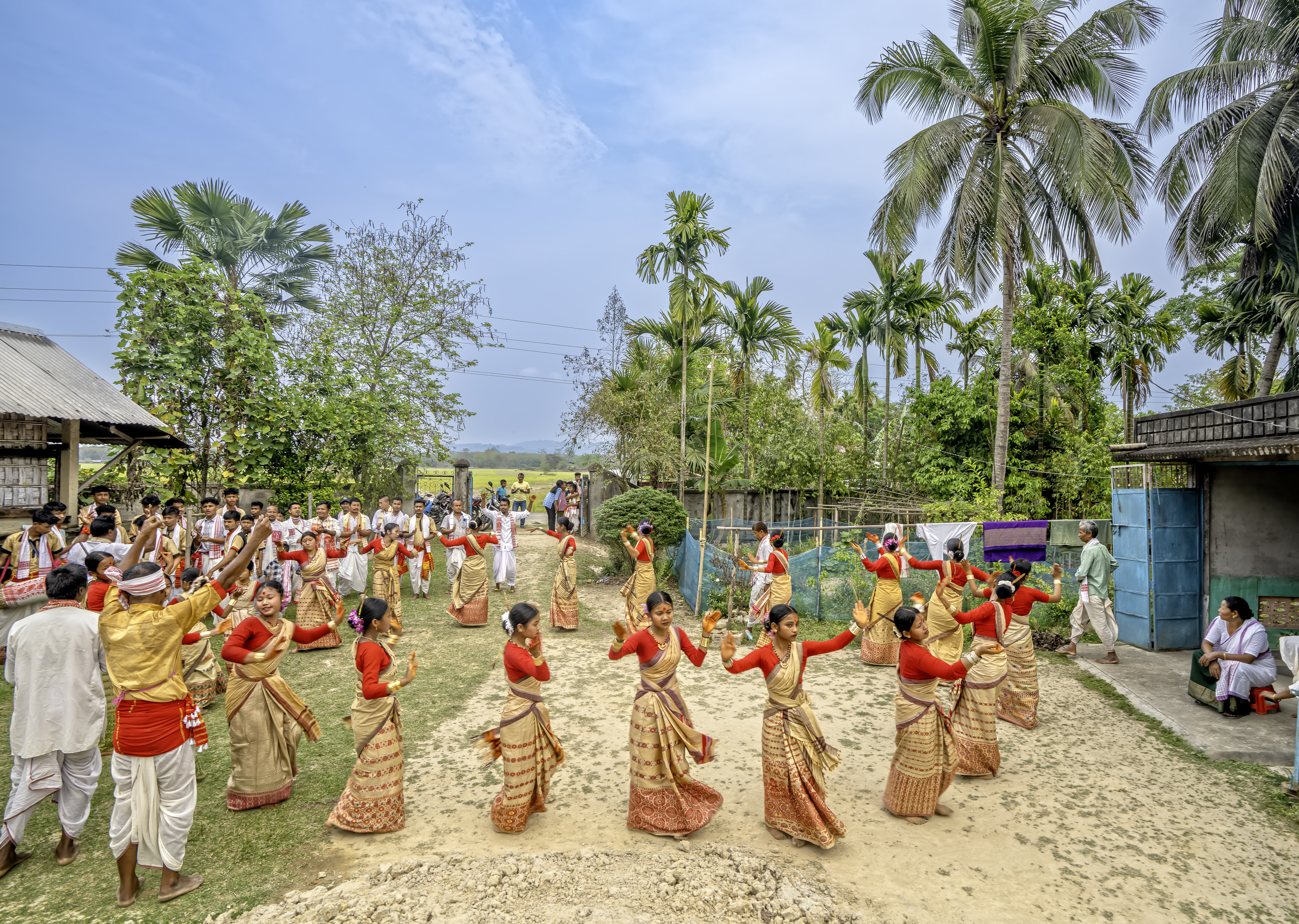
Husori troupe performing in a village courtyard during Rongali Bihu celebrations in Assam.
