= Li Bihu =

Chinese agronomist who developed the hybrid rice

- 李必湖

Director of Hunan Hybrid Rice Research Institute
- In office 1988–2003

Communist Party Secretary of Huaihua Vocational and Technical College
- In office 1988–2003

Personal details
- Born: February 1946 (age 80) Yuanling County, Hunan, China
- Party: Chinese Communist Party
- Education: Huaihua Vocational and Technical College; Hunan Agricultural University
- Scientific career
- Fields: Hybrid rice
- Workplaces: Huaihua Vocational and Technical College

Li Bihu (Chinese: 李必湖; pinyin: Lǐ Bìhú; born February 1946) is a Chinese agronomist best known for developing the hybrid rice. He was a student and assistant of Yuan Longping. He is a member of the Chinese Communist Party. He was a delegate to the 11th and 12th National Congress of the Chinese Communist Party. He was a delegate to the 9th and 10th National People's Congress.

== Biography ==
Li was born in Yuanling County, Hunan, in February 1946. After graduating from Anjiang Agricultural School (now Huaihua Vocational and Technical College) in 1966, he became the assistant of Yuan Longping. On November 23, 1970, he discovered common wild rice with male abortion in Hainan Island, which made great contribution to the research of hybrid rice. In 1973, he and Yuan Longping first developed strong dominant hybrid rice in the world. In 1976, he joined the Chinese Communist Party(CCP). In 1984, he joined the faculty of Anjiang Agricultural School, where he served as vice president and CCP Deputy Committee Secretary and was promoted to CCP Committee Secretary in 1988. He became director of Hunan Hybrid Rice Research Institute in 1988, and served until 2003. He is now the president of Huaihua Vocational and Technical College and vice chairman of Standing Committee of Huaihua People's Congress.
