= Bihu Songs of Assam =

1957 song book by Prafulladutta Goswami

- The cover page of Bihu Songs of Assam
- Author: Prafulladatta Goswami
- Language: English
- Subject: Folk songs
- Publisher: Lawyers Book Stall
- Publication date: 1957
- Publication place: Assam, India
- Media type: Print (Hardcover)
- Pages: 174

Bihu Songs of Assam is a book authored by Prafulladutta Goswamil, and published by Lawyers Book Stall in 1957. The book is a collection of 262 Bihu songs collected as early as 1921, which were first put into print in 1934. Although the songs are in English, each song is later shown in original Assamese text.
