= Kali (instrument) =

- Other names: Kāhāli, Kāhili
- Classification: Double reed; Wind; Aerophone

Related instruments
- Shehnai

Kali is a wind instrument, which is used in traditional Assamese folk music. Kali has its origins dating back to pre–Sankari era. The height of Kali is about 60 centimeters and is usually made of bamboo, brass, or weed. Its body has six to seven holes, varying of sizes, which are used for playing. The different tunes and sounds are produced by placing fingers on the holes. Presently the tradition of playing Kali has lost its significance and has almost become obsolete. It is known to be used in the Chutia kingdom and the Ahoms after defeating Chutias brought these instruments to their capital.

== See also ==
- Culture of Assam
- Music of Assam
