= Bihu =

Cultural festival in Assam, India

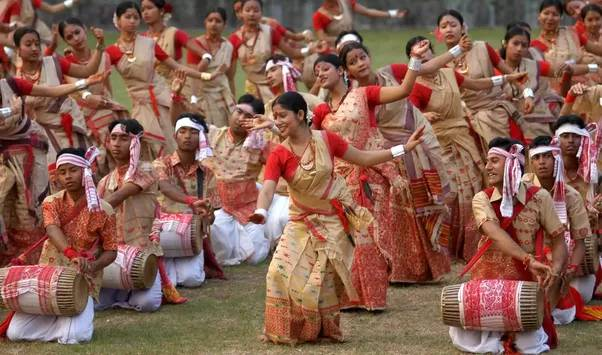
- Bihu of Assam
- Official name: Bihu
- Also called: Rongali Bihu, Kati Bihu, Bhogali Bihu
- Observed by: People of Assam
- Type: Regional folk
- Ends: Varies
- Duration: Bhogali Bihu- two days, Rongali Bihu - Actually 7 days with different types, but mostly celebrated for 2 to 3 days, Kaati Bihu - celebrated 1 day
- Frequency: Tri-annual
- Related to: Busu Dima

Bihu (Assamese pronunciation: [bi'hu]) is an important cultural festival unique to the Indian state of Assam and is of three types – 'Rongali' or 'Bohag Bihu' observed in April, 'Kongali' or 'Kati Bihu' observed in October or November, and 'Bhogali' or 'Magh Bihu' observed in January. The festivals present an admixture of Tibeto-Birman, Austroasiatic and Indo-Aryan traditions entwined so intricately that it is impossible to separate them—festivals which are uniquely Assamese are ones to which all communities of Assam had contributed elements. The Rongali Bihu is the most important of the three, celebrating spring festival. The Bhogali Bihu or the Magh Bihu is a harvest festival, with community feasts. The Kongali Bihu or the Kati Bihu is the sombre, thrifty one reflecting a season of short supplies and is an animistic festival.

The Rongali Bihu is the most important of them all, coincides with the Assamese New Year and as well as with other regions of Indian subcontinent, East Asia and South-East Asia, which follow the Hindu calendar and Buddhist calendar. The other two Bihu festivals every year are unique to Assamese people. Like some other Indian festivals, Bihu is associated with agriculture, and rice in particular. Bohag Bihu is a sowing festival, Kati Bihu is associated with crop protection and worship of plants and crops and is an animistic form of the festival, while Bhogali Bihu is a harvest festival. Assamese celebrate the Rongali Bihu with feasts, music and dancing. Some hang brass, copper or silver pots on poles in front of their house, while children wear flower garlands then greet the new year as they pass through the rural streets.

The three Bihu are Assamese festivals elders in family, fertility and mother goddess, but the celebrations and rituals reflect influences from Southeast Asia and Sino-Tibetan cultures. In contemporary times, the Bihus are celebrated by all Assamese people irrespective of religion, caste or creed. It is also celebrated overseas by the Assamese diaspora community living worldwide.

The term Bihu is also used to imply Bihu dance otherwise called Bihu Naas and Bihu folk songs also called Bihu Geet.

== History ==
=== Indigenous origin ===
The word Bihu has been derived from the Deori (a Boro-Garo language) word Bisu which means "excessive joy". Original form of Bihu continues among the Chutias, Sonowal Kacharis, Thengal Kacharis and Deoris. These groups, known as Sadiyal Kacharis were associated with the historical Kingdom of Sadiya. The other branches of Bodo-Kacharis which include Boros, Dimasas, Rabhas, Tiwas, etc. have also been celebrating Bihu since ancient times. The Boros call it Baisagu, while the Dimasas, Tiwa and Rabha call it Bushu or Bushu Dima, (Note: "Busu Dima festival begins in Dima Hasao", Times Of India)Pisu, Dumsi respectively.

In local folklore, it is said that Bordoisila (Bardai Sikhla in Bodo) (meaning north-westerly winds in Assamese) was the daughter of God Earth who married to a bridegroom of some distant land. Bordoisila visits her mother's home once in year during spring time which indicates the beginning of Bihu and leaves after a few days which indicates the end of Bihu. Assam experience strong gale (wind) at that period which marks the beginning of Bihu and another strong gale after her departure which is devastating. The word Bordoisila is derived from the Bodo word Bordaisikhla which means "girl of storm" (Sikhla meaning girl and Bardai meaning storm). There is even a dance with the same name performed among Boro people during Baisagu which points to the origin of Bihu in the Bodo-Kachari groups. (Note: "BOHAG BIHU",Outlook India)

Yet another reference of Bihu can be found in the Deodhai Buranji which mentions that the capital of the Chutia kingdom, Sadiya was suddenly attacked by the Ahom forces on the first day of Bihu/Bisu in 1524 (first Wednesday of Bohag/Vaisakha), when the people were busy celebrating Bihu. The Ahom general Phrasenmung Borgohain upon the advice of a Chutia general (who sided with the enemies) played the Bihu Dhul (on Ujha Bisu day i.e. 7th Bohag/Vaisakha) to trick the Chutias which ultimately led to their defeat.

In early texts, Bohag Bihu celebrations started from the first week of Chot in Assamese month. The period from the first week of Chaitra till the end was known as Raati Bihu or Chotor Bihu. During this period, young people danced at night in the grounds of the Than (temple). The last day of Chaitra or the first Tuesday of Bohag was when the Rati Bihu ended. This was known as the Uruka (derived from the Deori-Chutia Urukuwa meaning to end). The temple dancers Deodhani danced the entire night and were believed to be possessed by the goddess Kechai-khati (kolimoti), signaling that she had descended upon earth from heaven (Bihu nomai ona). This belief of the goddess arriving during the Bihu season each year can still be found in Bihu songs as,

"Kolimoti e bai ghuri Bohagoloi
Ahibi ne nai?
Ami thakim ami thakim
Baatoloi sai."

The day after Uruka, i.e. the first Wednesday was celebrated as Goru Bihu. This tradition of cattle rites is same as that followed by the Boros in Bwisagu indicating the common roots of both the festivals. During the night of Goru-bihu, people danced Bihu in separate groups in the Thans where animal sacrifice took place. After the sacrifices to the goddess, the young folk visited the households of the village, which was the start of Husori. This old tradition of starting Husori from the temple is still followed by the Deoris, some Sonowals, Chutias and Morans as well as the people of Sadiya. In other communities, the temple has been replaced by the Namghar. The festivities of Bohag Bihu continued for a week and ended with the rite by which the goddess was bid farewell. In this rite, a boat was first prepared out of banana stem and decorated with flowers and offerings. Then, it was carried to the banks of the river where a duck/chicken was put inside the boat and allowed to float as a symbol of sacrifice. After performing the rite, the people returned to their homes, singing along the way with the beats of the Dhul and the tunes of the Pepa.

Some old Assamese Bihu folklore still hint to this tradition.

“Hasoti e chot Bisoti e chot.
Budhe Goru Bihu Mangale Uruka.
Bihu goi asili kot.”

“Boge dhari khale luitor hihu,
Mangal bare Uruka Budh bare Goru Bihu
Tar pasor dina Manisor Bihu.”

“Husori e chot asili kot.
Sadiyar ahotor tolot,
Husori e chot asili kot.
Ami je ulomu jot Dubori nogoje tot.”

“Kundilor agolit ukhokoi Himolu.
Tate loi kuruwai bah.
Sadiyar rajate sari haal goxani
Taloi namaskar koru.
Hunare jakhala Rupor hetamari
Ahe sari haali nami.”

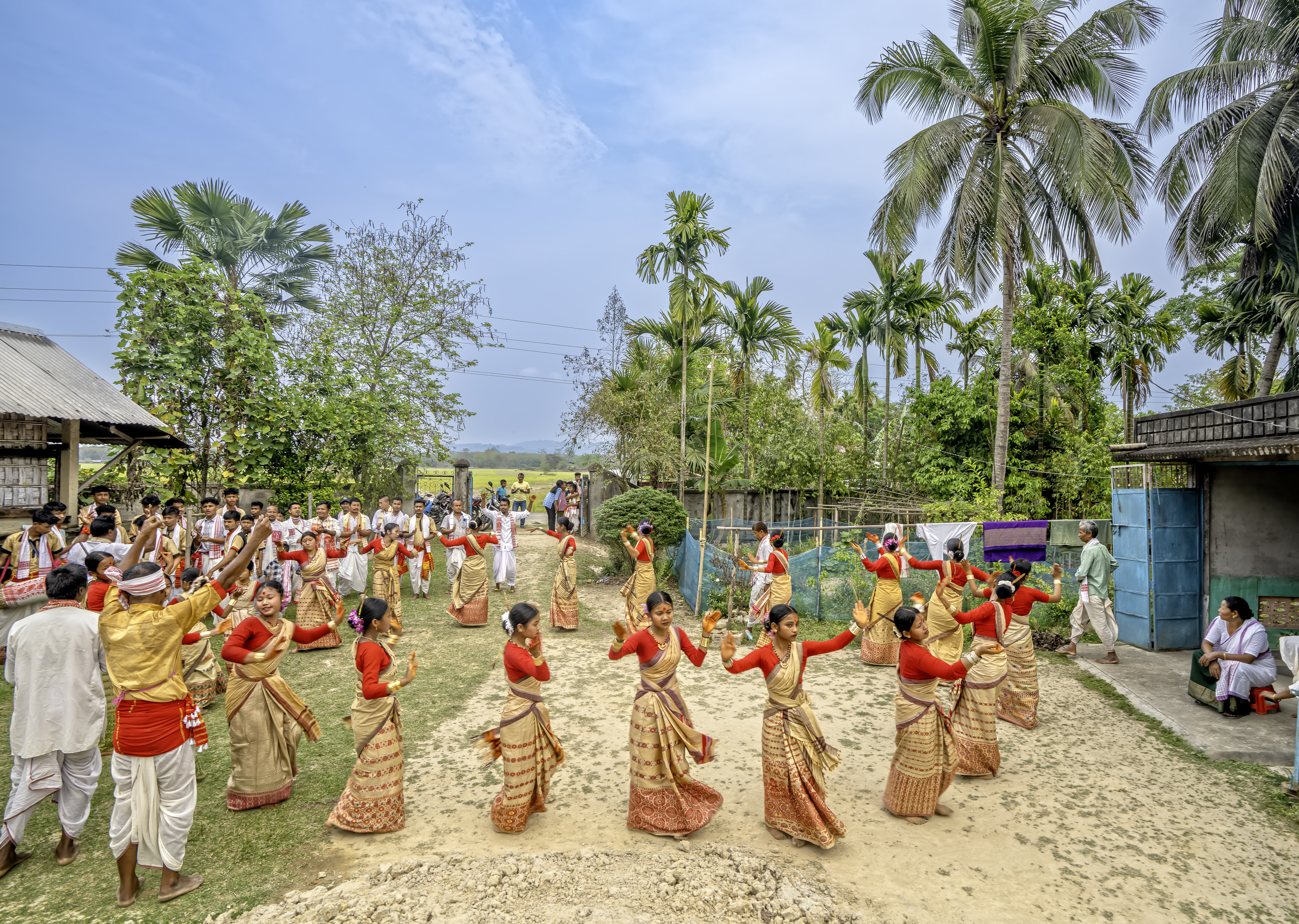
Husori (Bihu Dance) troupe performing in a village courtyard during Rongali Bihu celebrations in Assam.

The modern form of Bihu dance was derived from the Faat Bihu dance celebrated in Dhakuakhana, Lakhimpur. The performers were called by the Ahom king Rudra Singha in 1694 to dance in the royal arena Rang Ghar. The origin of Faat Bihu can be traced to Sadiya. The word Faat in Deori-Chutia language means "to migrate". After the defeat of the Sadiyal Kacharis in Sadiya, the survivors were displaced from Sadiya to different places in the kingdom. A group of these people moved from Sadiya, to Dibrugarh and finally settled down in Harhi Sapori, Dhakuakhana. These people had brought the idols of god and goddess along with them and established a temple now known as Harhi Dewaloi. It was here that the first form of modern Bihu dance was developed. Later, in the 19th century, this form of Bihu dance was adopted by the other communities as well and started being performed in Mahguli sapori, Dhakuakhana by Chutias, Sonowals, Deoris, Ahoms, Mishing etc.

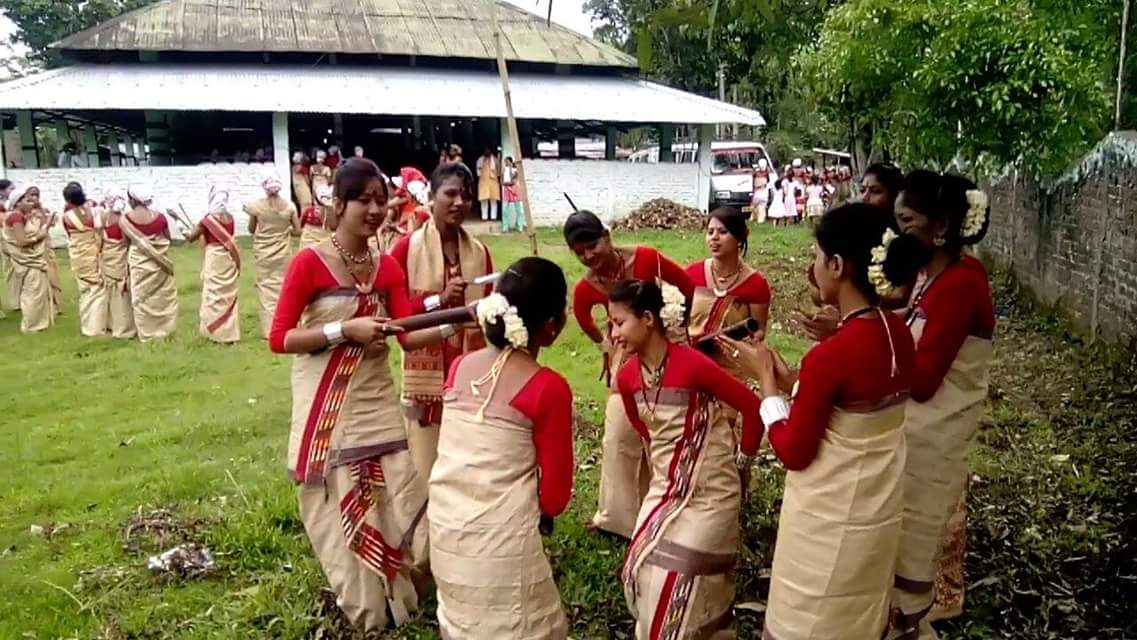
The Faat Bihu dance at Harhidewaloi has been performed in the same form since the 16th century.

=== Ahom contribution ===
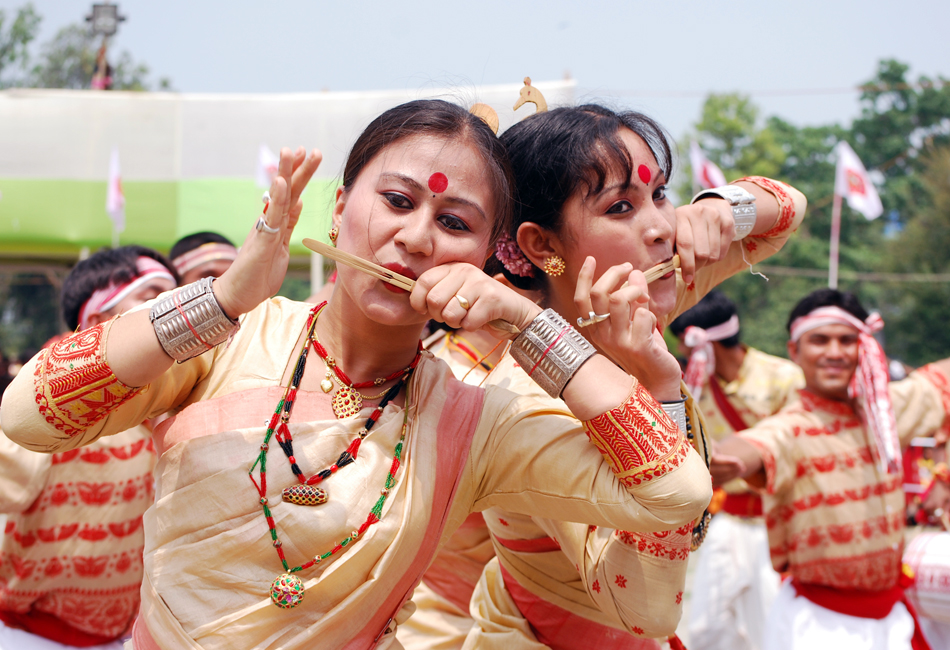
Gogona played during Bihu

Ahoms used to celebrate their own spring festival Chyeng-Ken (similar to the Thai word Songkran which is derived from the Sanskrit word for new year saṅkrānt (संक्रान्ति); the rituals of Chyeng-Ken are described in Khyek-Lai-Bet manuscript. But later on they adopted Bihu as their spring festival. Ahom King Rudra Singha gave patronage to Bihu and was also the first one to celebrate Bihu in the courtyard of Rang Ghar. This policy was later followed by his successors.

== The three Bihu Festivals ==
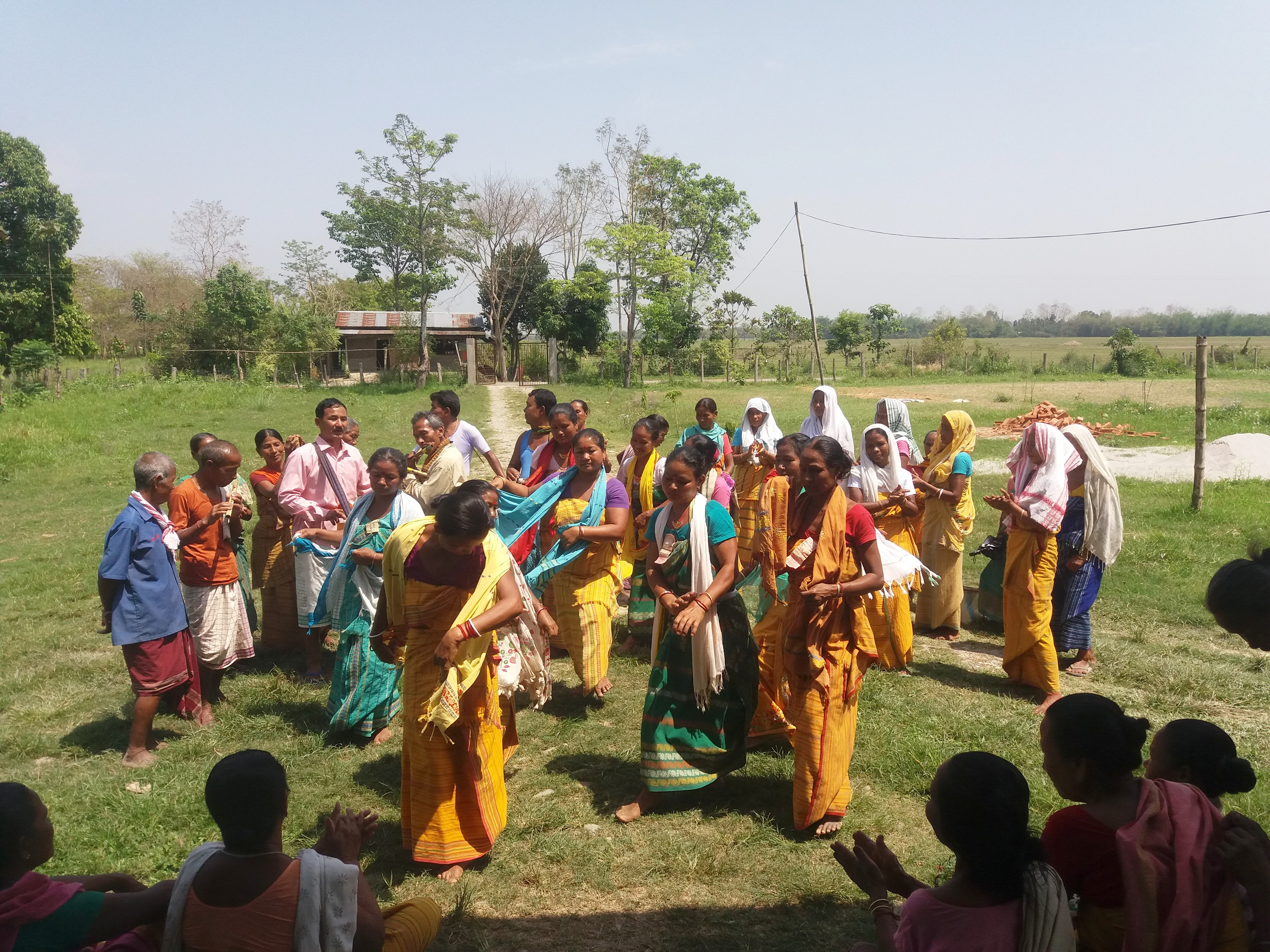
Bihu refer to as Bwisãgu by the Bodos

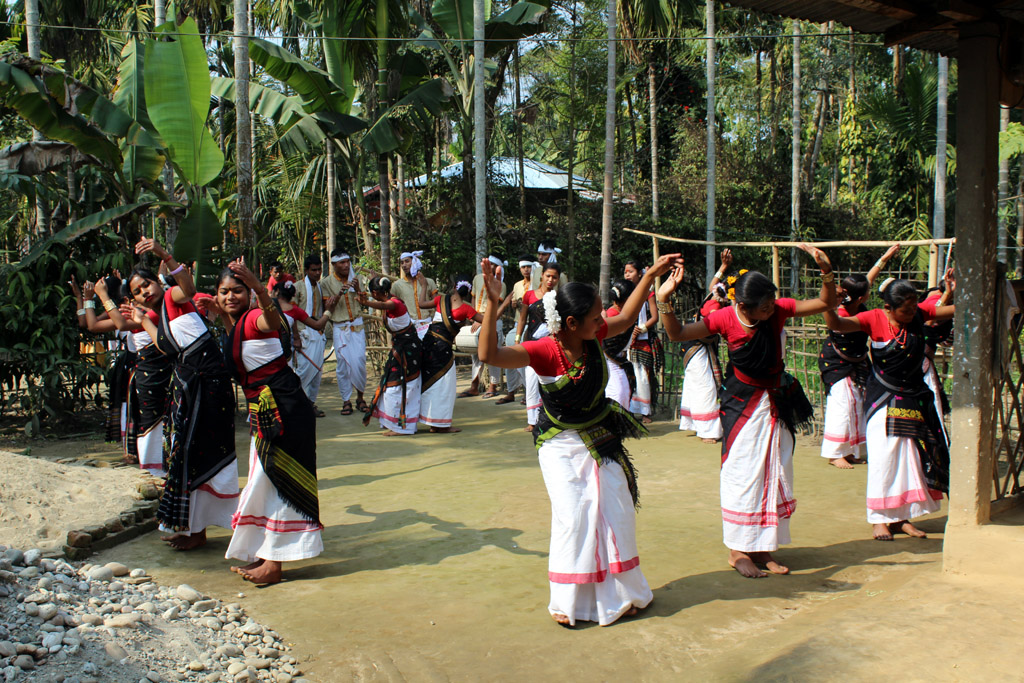
Bihu of Moran ethnic group

=== Bohag Bihu ===
Bohag Bihu (mid-April, also called Rongali Bihu), the most popular Bihu celebrates the onset of the Assamese New Year (around 14–15 April) and the coming of Spring. This marks the first day of the Hindu solar calendar and is also observed in Bengal, Manipur, Mithila, Nepal, Orissa, Punjab, Kerala and Tamil Nadu though called by different names. It's a time of merriment and feasting and continues, in general, for seven days. The farmers prepare the fields for cultivation of paddy and there is a feeling of joy around. The women make pitha, laroos (traditional food made of rice, coconut) various drinks by local tribes such as Chuje by Deoris, Nam-Lao by Tai-Ahom, Aapong by Mising tribe and Jolpan which gives the real essence of the season.

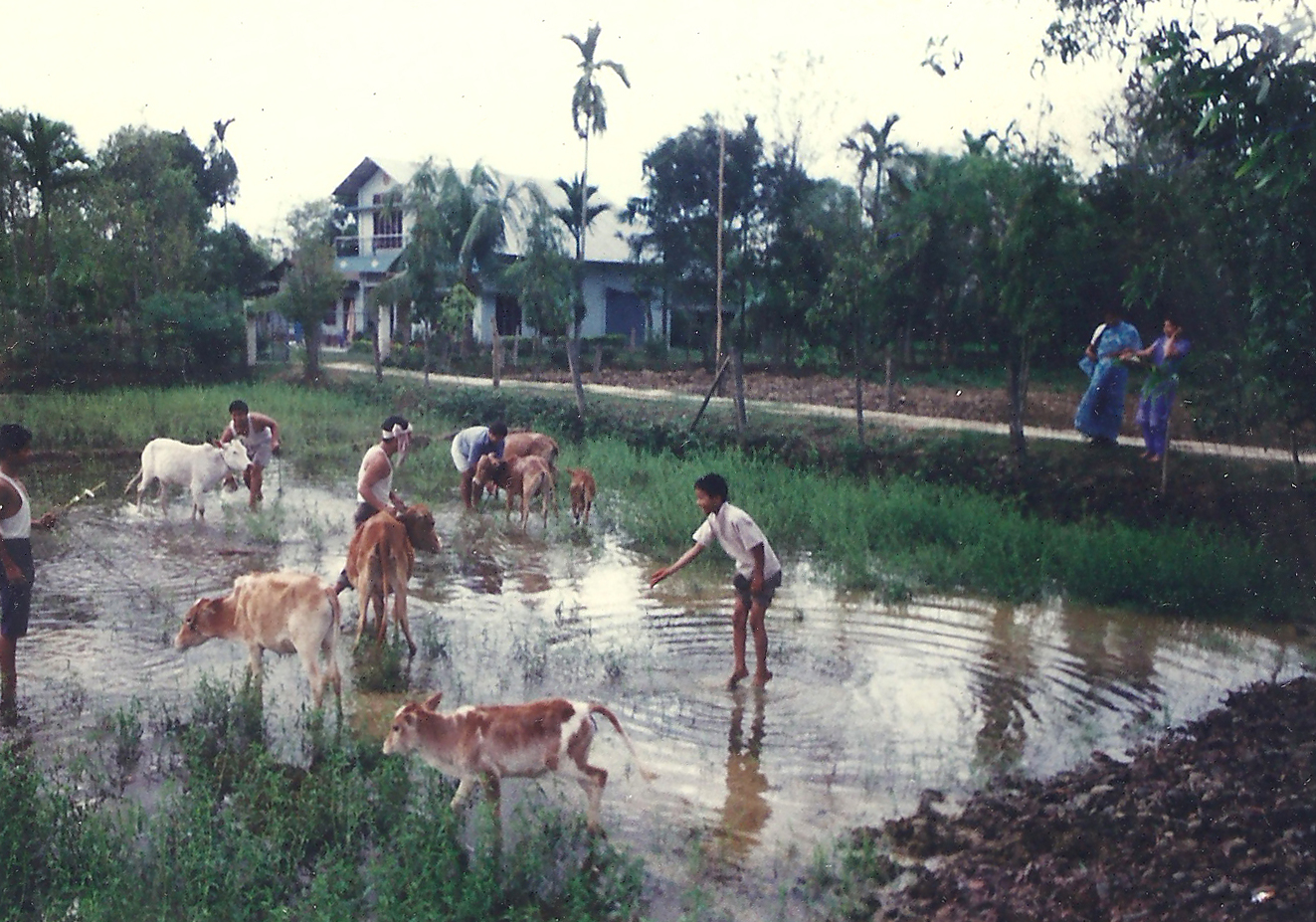
Bathing and worshipping cows (Goru bihu) is a part of the Bihu celebrations.

The first day of the bihu is called goru (goru means cow in Assamese language) bihu, where the cows are washed and worshipped, which falls on the last day of the previous year, usually on 14 April. This is followed by manuh (manuh means man kind in Assamese) bihu on 15 April, the New Year Day. This is the day of getting cleaned up, wearing new cloths and celebrating and getting ready for the new year with fresh vigor. The third day is Gosai (Gods) bihu; statues of Gods, worshiped in all households are cleaned and worshiped asking for a smooth new year.

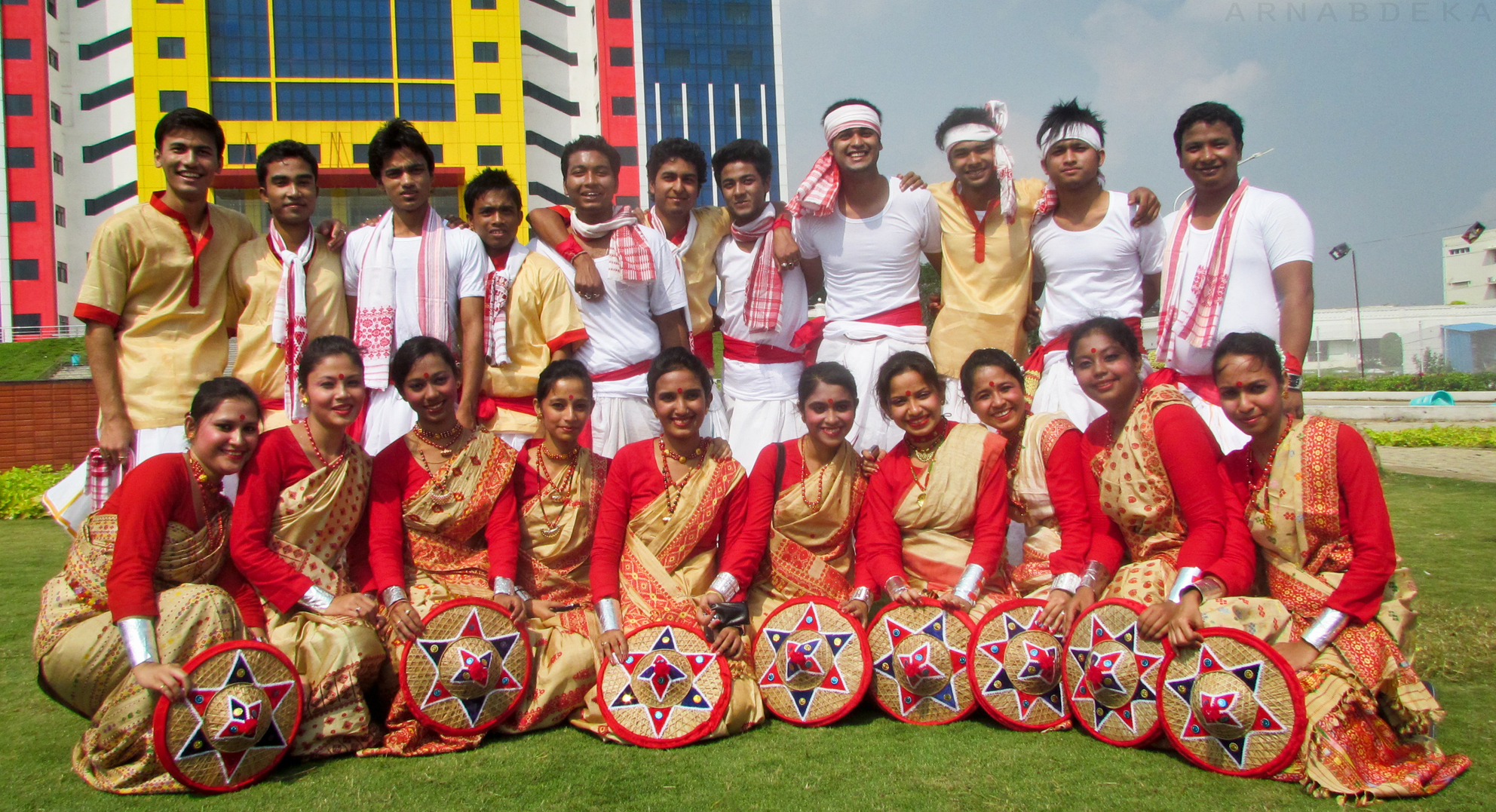
Bihu dance marks the festival

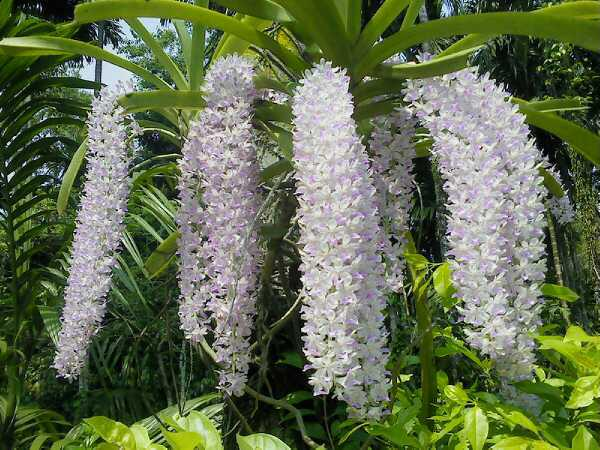
Kopou phool (Rhynchostylis retusa)

The folk songs associated with the Bohag Bihu are called Bihu geets or Bihu songs. The form of celebration and rites vary among different demographic groups.

=== The Seven days ===
Bohag Bihu or Rongali Bihu festival continues for seven days and called as Haat Bihu. The seven days are known as Chot Bihu, Goru Bihu, Manuh Bihu, Kutum Bihu, Senehi Bihu, Mela Bihu and Chera Bihu.

Goru Bihu: The goru bihu or cattle worship rites are observed on the last day of the year. The cattle are washed, smeared with ground turmeric and other pastes, struck with sprigs of dighalati and makhiyati and endeared to be healthy and productive (lao kha, bengena kha, bosore bosore barhi ja / maar xoru, baper xoru, toi hobi bor bor goru—eat gourd, eat brinjal, grow from year to year / your mother is small, your father is small, but you be a large one). The old cattle ropes are cast away through the legs and new ropes are tied to them, and they are allowed to roam anywhere they wished for the entire day.

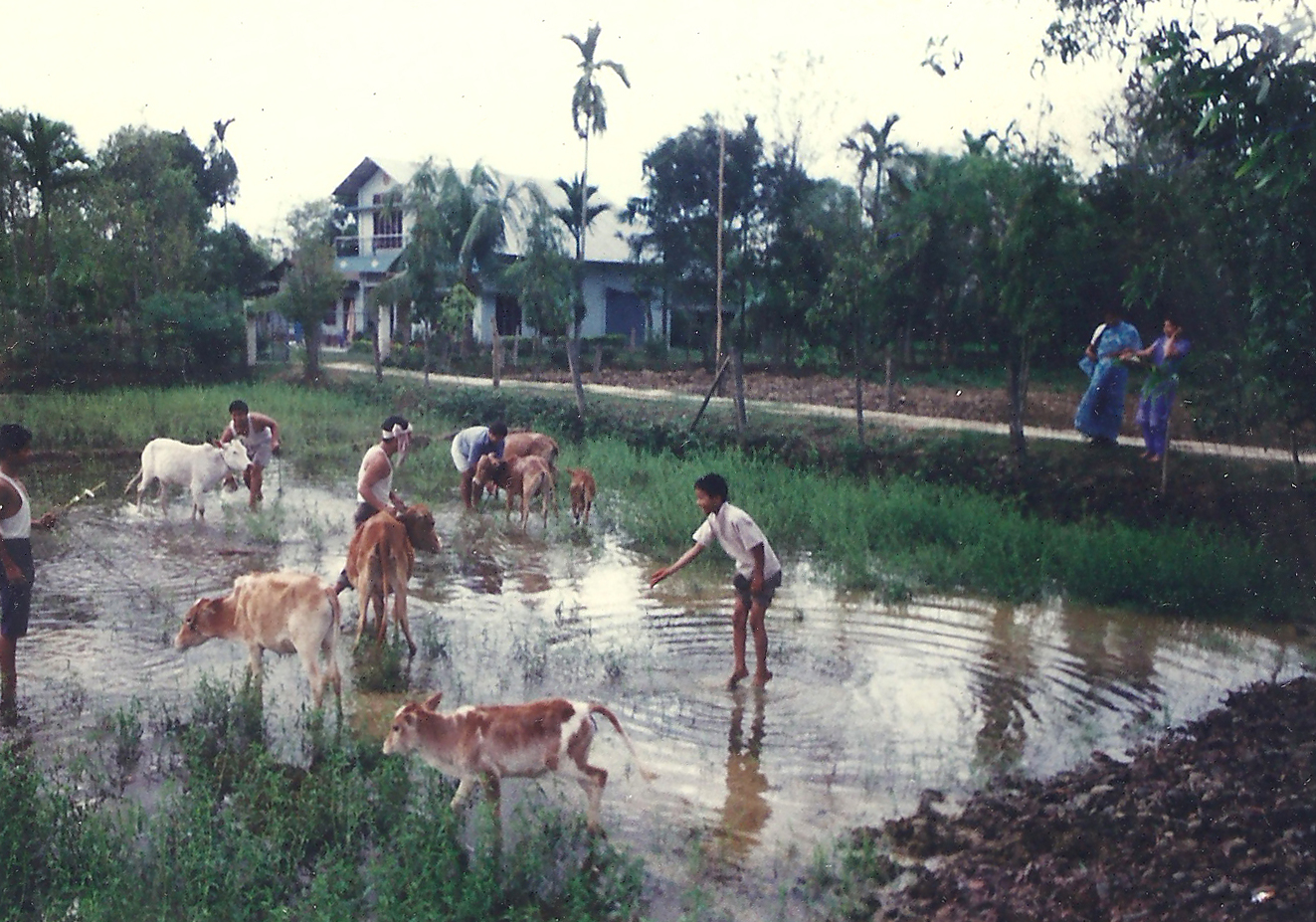
Bathing cow on the eve of Goru bihu

Manuh Bihu: The New Year Day, the day after the goru bihu, is called the manuh bihu. Elders are shown respect, with gifts of bihuwan (a gamosa), a hachoti (kerchief), a cheleng etc., and their blessings are sought. Children are given new clothes, and Husori singing begins on this day, and people visit their relatives and friends.

Husori: Village elders move from household to households singing carols, also in the style of bihu geets, called husoris.

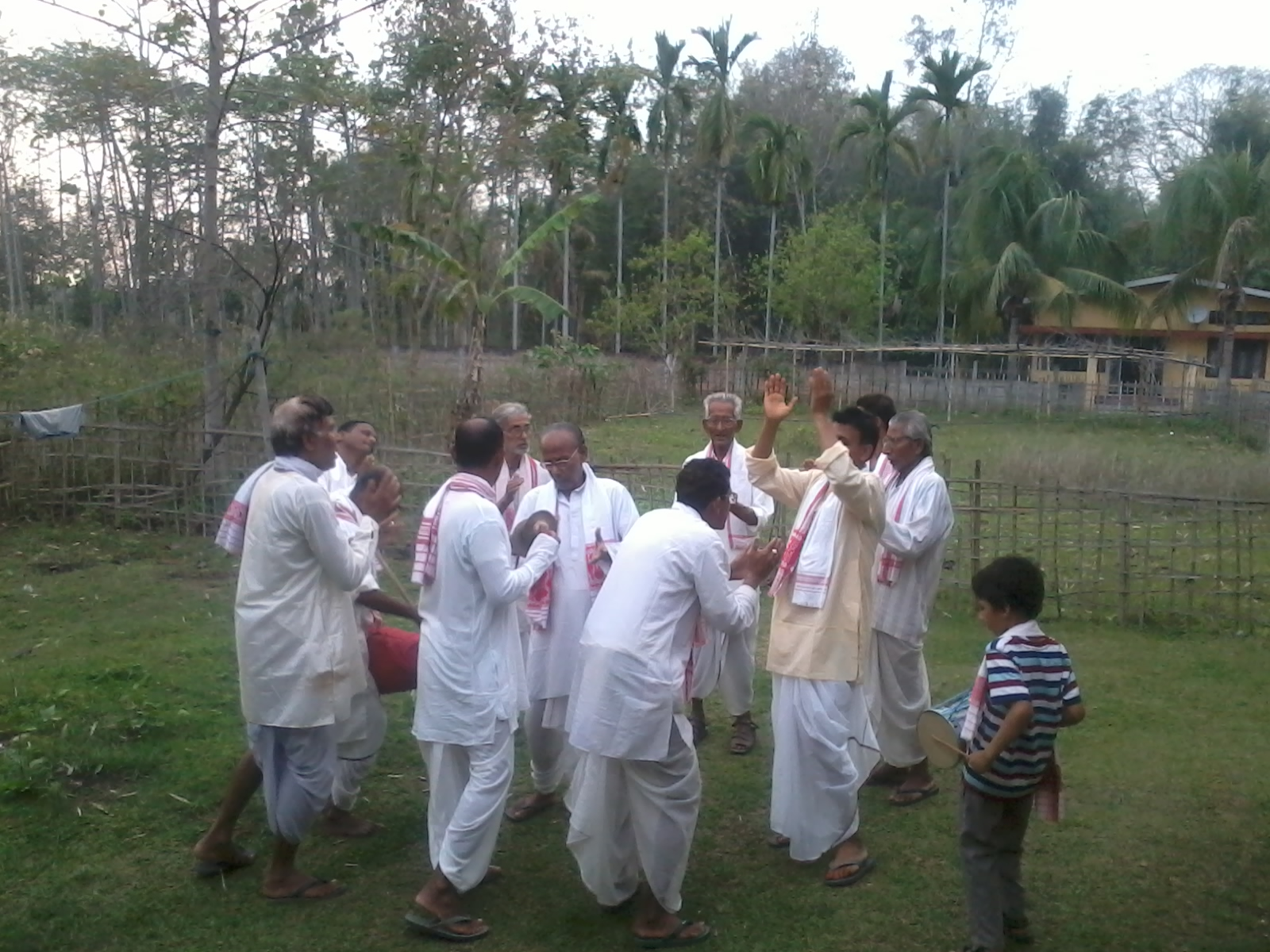
Husori in Bihu

It possibly derives from the Dimasa Kachari word formation ha (land) and char (move over): hachari. Villages could have more than one Husori band, and they would visit households in a village non-contiguous to itself, first singing carols at the Naamghar. The husari singers then visit individual households, by first announcing their arrival at the gate (podulimukh) with drum beats. The singers are traditionally welcomed into the courtyard where they sing the husori songs and perform a ring dance. At the end of the performance they are thanked with an offering dakshina of paan (betel leaf) tamul (areka nut) in a xorai (brass dish with stand), whereupon the singers bless the household for the coming year. If there is a bereavement in the family, or the family does not invite the husori singers due to an illness, the husori band offers blessings from podulimukh and move on. Generally the singers are all male.

Faat Bihu: This is a very old form of Bihu, characterized by spontaneity, popular in the Lakhimpur area of Assam.

Mukoli Bihu: Young unmarried men and women attired in traditional golden silk muga dance the bihu and sing bihu songs in the open fields. The songs have themes of romance and sexual love, requited or unrequited. Sometimes the songs describe tragic events too but treated very lightly. The dance celebrates female sexuality.

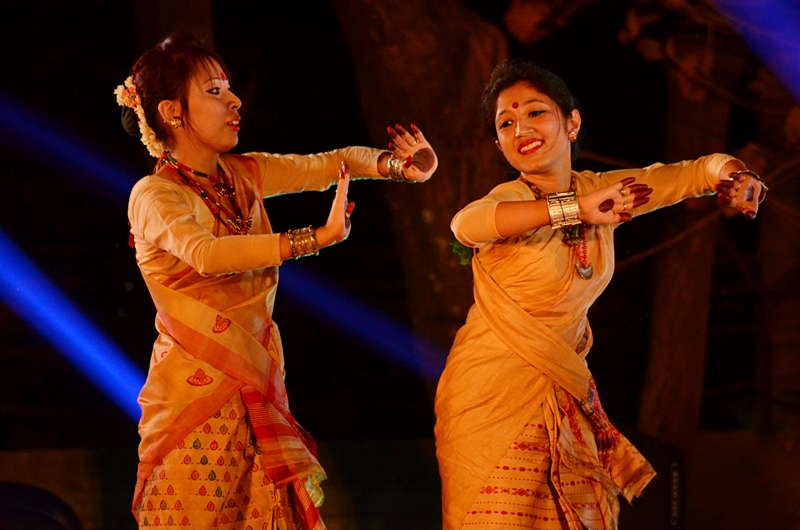
Jeng Bihu dancers at Rongali Bihu celebration in Bangalore organized by Assam Association of Karnataka.

Jeng Bihu: This is Bihu dance and song performed and watched only by women. The name "jeng" comes from the fact that in earlier days women in the villages used to surround the place of their performance with sticks dug into the ground called jeng in Assamese. It is also called gos tolor bihu (Bihu beneath the tree).

Baisago: The Bodo-Kachari people celebrate for seven days—the first day for cattle (Magou), the second day for man (Mansoi) and ancestor worship, feasting, singing and merriment. Songs follow the same themes as the Bihu songs.

Bihutoli Bihu: The rural festival made its transition to urban life when it was first time brought to the stage in Lataxil field in Guwahati by the Guwahati Bihu Sanmilani in 1962, promoted by leading citizens like Radha Govinda Baruah and others. Bihu to a great extent has been popularized by the Bihu 'Samrat'( king ), of Assam, Khagen Mahanta. Unlike the rural version, the dancers danced on a makeshift elevated stage in an open area that came to be known as a Bihutoli.

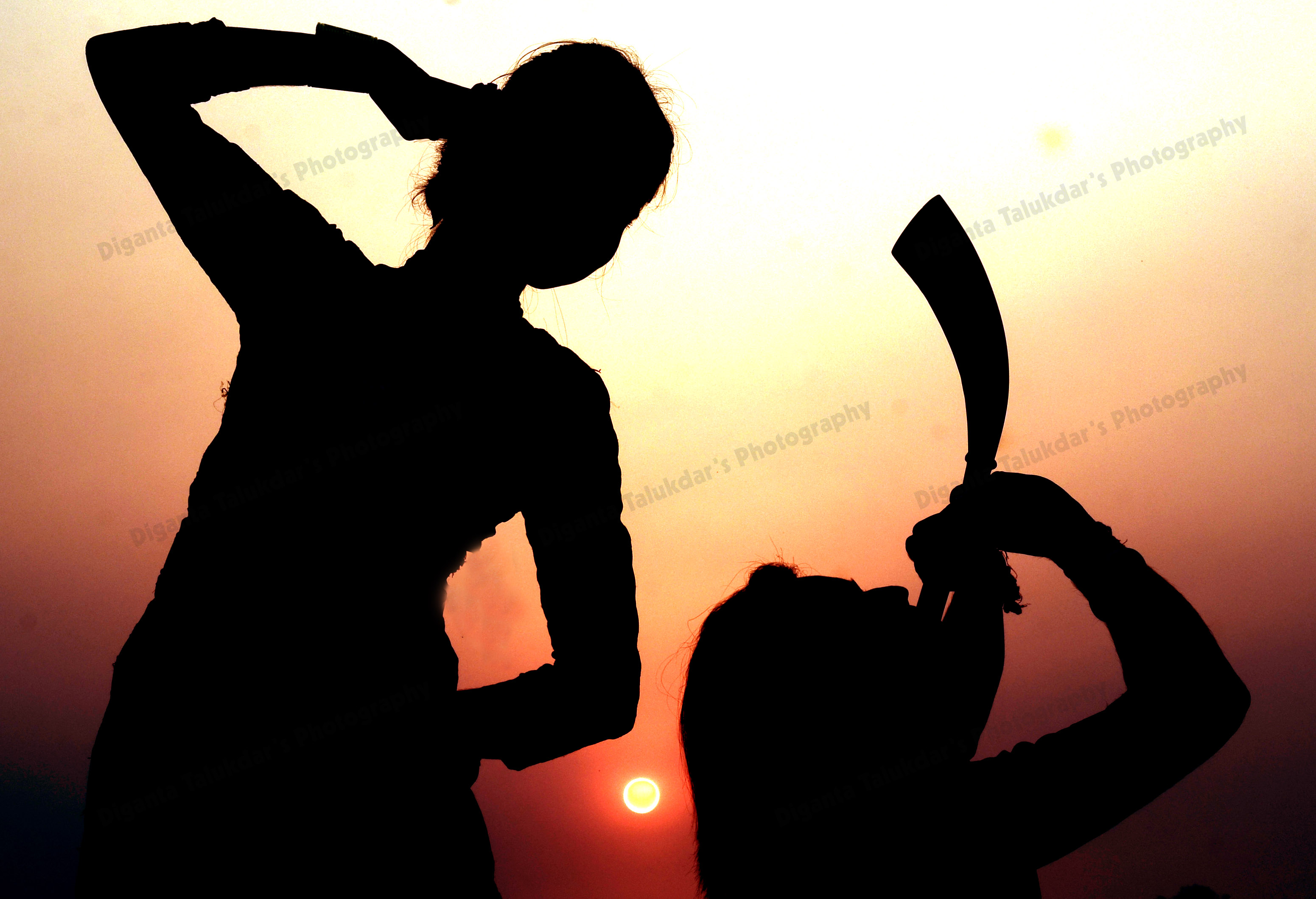
Youths perform Bihu dance during Rongali Bihu Celebration in Assam

Many such Bihutolis have sprouted since then in Guwahati and other urban areas. The performances are not confined to the Bihu dance form but may incorporate all forms of theatrical performances to keep the audience enthralled well into the early hours. Performances could include standup comedy, to concerts by solo singers. The stage form of Bihu has become so popular, that organizers have begun extending the celebrations to bohagi bidai, or farewell to the Bohag month, which is similar performances held a month later.

Saat Bihu: Rongali Bihu also called saat Bihu (seven Bihus). It celebrates seven days, it's called so. On the other hand, Rangali Bihu is constitute of seven different types of Bihu -Goru Bihu (Cow Bihu), Manuh Bihu, Xat Bihu, Senehi Bihu, Maiki Bihu, Rongali Bihu, and Sera Bihu. Actually, the first day to pay respect to cows and other days for social activities.

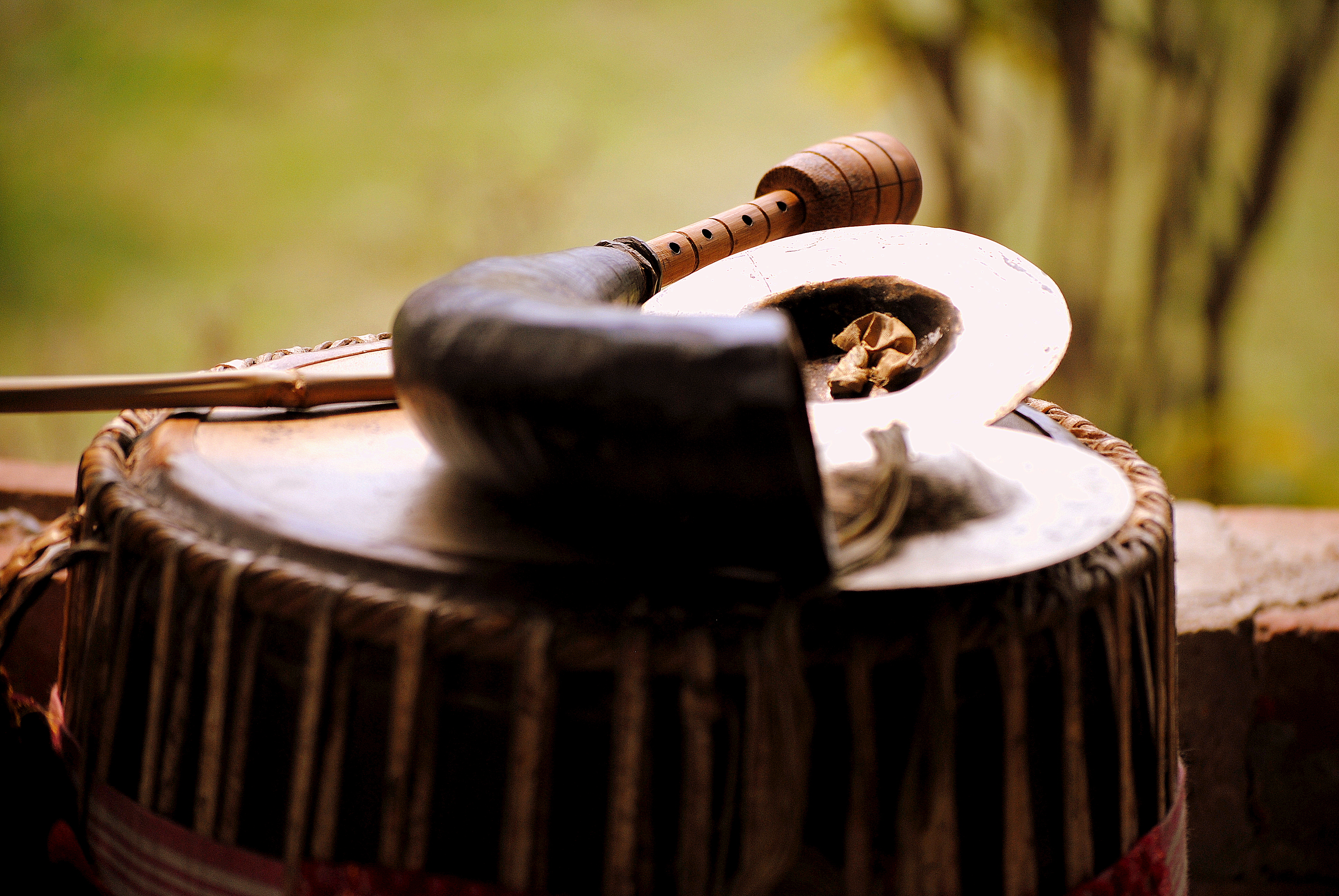
The key musical instruments - Dhol, Pepa and Taal used during Bihu song / dance.

=== Kati Bihu ===
Kongali Bihu (mid-October, also called Kati-Bihu) has a different flavor as there is less merriment and the atmosphere has a sense of constraining and solemnity. During this time of the year, the paddy in the fields are in the growing stage and the granaries of the farmers are almost empty. On this day, earthen lamps (saki) are lit at the foot of the household tulsi plant, the granary, the garden (bari) and the paddy fields. In ancient times, earthen lamps were lit all around the paddy fields to attract the insects, thus acting as a natural insecticide. To protect the maturing paddy, cultivators whirl a piece of bamboo and recite rowa-khowa chants and spells to ward off pests and the evil eye. During the evening, cattle are fed specially made rice items called pitha. Kati Bihu is known as Kati Gasa by the Bodo people and Gathi Sainjora by the Dimasa people. The Bodo people light lamps at the foot of the siju (Euphorbia neriifolia) tree. This Bihu is also associated with the lighting of akaxi gonga or akaxbonti, lamps at the tip of a tall bamboo pole, to show the souls of the dead the way to heaven, a practice that is common to many communities in India, as well as Asia and Europe. Kati bihu is generally celebrated around 19 October, as it is almost mid-October.

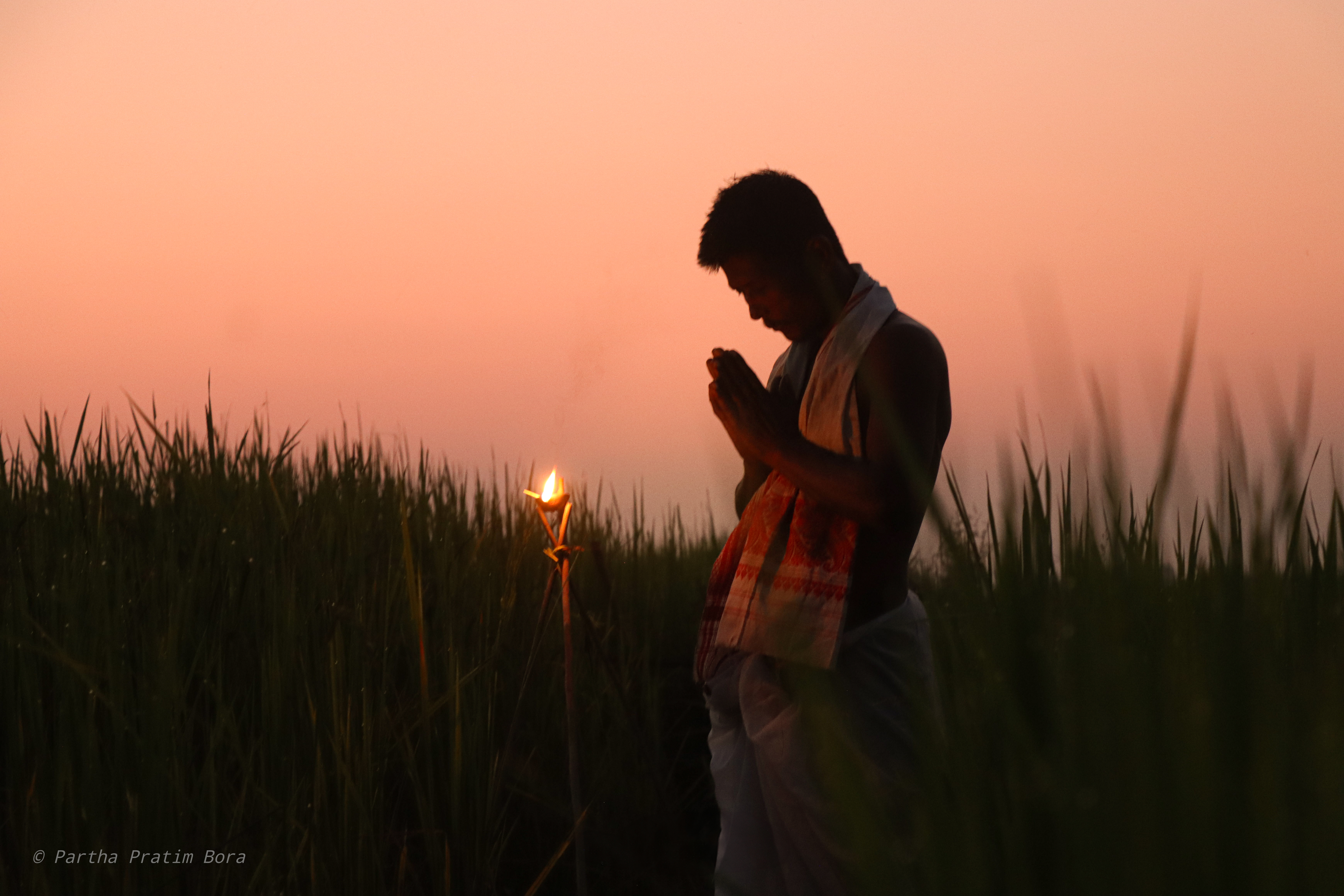
This festival marks a period of solemnity and prayer, as it coincides with the growing season of the paddy crops. Farmers light earthen lamps, known as "saki," in the fields, seeking blessings for a bountiful harvest. The image captured by documentary photographer Partha Pratim Bora beautifully depicts a man paying homage to nature, symbolizing the deep connection between the Assamese people and their land. The soft glow of the lamp against the dusky sky creates a serene and spiritual atmosphere, embodying the essence of Kati Bihu.

=== Magh Bihu ===
Bhogali Bihu (mid-January, also called Magh Bihu) comes from the word Bhog that is eating and enjoyment. It is a harvest festival and marks the end of harvesting season. Since the granaries are full, there is a lot of feasting and eating during this period. On the eve of the day called uruka, i.e., the last day of pausa, menfolk, more particularly young men go to the field, preferably near a river, build a makeshift cottage called Bhelaghar with the hay of the harvest fields and the bonfire or Meji, . the most important thing for the night. During the night, they prepare food and there is community feasting everywhere. There is also the exchange of sweets and greetings at this time. The entire night (called Uruka) is spent around a Meji with people singing bihu songs, beating Dhol, a typical kind of drums or playing games. Boys roam about in the dark stealing firewood and vegetables for fun. The next morning they take a bath and burn the main Meji. People gather around the Meji and throw Pithas (rice cakes) and betel nuts to it while burning it at the same time. They offer their prayers to the god of Fire and mark the end of the harvesting year. Thereafter they come back home carrying pieces of half burnt firewood for being thrown among fruit trees for favorable results. All the trees in the compound are tied to bamboo strips or paddy stems. Different types of sports like Buffalo-fight, Egg-fight, Cock-fight, Nightingale-fight etc. are held throughout the day. There are other conventional festivals observed by various ethnic-cultural groups. Me-dam-me-phi, Ali-aye-ligang, Porag, Garja, Hapsa Hatarnai, Kherai are few among them. The koch celebrates this bihu as pushna.

== Instruments used in Bihu ==
- Dhol (Drum)
- Taal
- Pepa (An instrument made of buffalo horn)
- Toka
- Baanhi (Flute)
- Xutuli
- Gogona (An instrument made of Bambo)

== Bihu elsewhere ==
Bihu is also seen to be celebrated abroad. Many Bihu associations/committees exist elsewhere where this festival is celebrated with enthusiasm. The London Bihu Committee (LBC), UK is one of them among others.

== Related festivals ==
The Bohag Bihu (Rongali Bihu) festive day is celebrated elsewhere but called by other name. Some examples of related festivals in Asia include: Indian subcontinent:

- Sinhalese New Year in Sri Lanka.

East Asia:

- Cambodian New Year in Cambodia, Thingyan in Burma, Songkran festival in Thailand and other festivals of East Asia and South-East Asia

== See also ==
- Bihu Songs of Assam
