= Bihu dance =

Indigenous folk dance from Assam, India

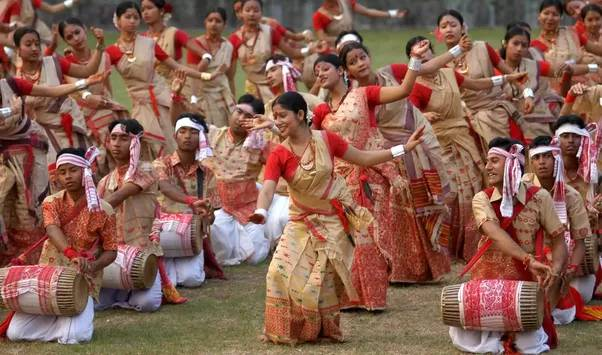
- Youths perform Bihu dance in Assam
- Genre: Folk dance
- Inventor: Deori, Thengals, Chutias, Sonowals
- Origin: Assam, India

The Bihu dance is an indigenous folk dance from the Indian state of Assam related to the Bihu festival and an important part of Assamese culture. Performed in a group, the Bihu dancers are usually young men and women, and the dancing style is characterized by brisk steps and rapid hand movements. The traditional costume of dancers is centered around the red color theme, signifying joy and vigour.

== History ==
The origins of the dance form are unknown; however, the folk dance tradition has always been very significant in the culture of Assam's diverse ethnic groups, such as Deoris, Sonowal Kacharis, Chutias, Boros, Misings, Rabhas, Moran and Borahis, among others. According to scholars, the Bihu dance has its origins in ancient fertility cults that were associated with increasing the fertility of the population as well as the land. Traditionally, local farming communities performed the dance outdoors, in fields, groves, forests or on the banks of rivers, especially under the fig tree.

Bihu dance being performed by Deori community women

== Description ==
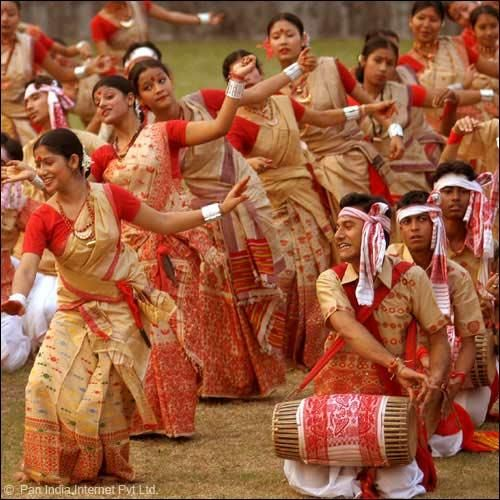
Bihu dance, Assam

The dance begins with the performers, young men and women, slowly walking into the performance space. The men then start playing musical instruments, like drums (particularly the double-headed dhol), horn-pipes and flutes, while the women place their hands above their hips with their palms facing outwards, forming an inverted triangular shape. The women then start to slowly move in tune with the music by swaying, while bending slightly forward from the waist. Gradually, they open up their shoulders and place their legs slightly apart, adopting the main posture used in the Bihu dance. Meanwhile, the music played by the men picks up in temp, leading women to thrust forward their breasts and pelvis, alternatively, to the tune.

== Culture and social ==
The Bihu dance takes its name from the Bohag Bihu festival (also called Rangali Bihu), the national festival of Assam, which celebrates the Assamese New Year. The festival takes place in mid-April, and the Bihu dance is meant to celebrate and emulate the seasonal spirit, celebrating fertility and passion.

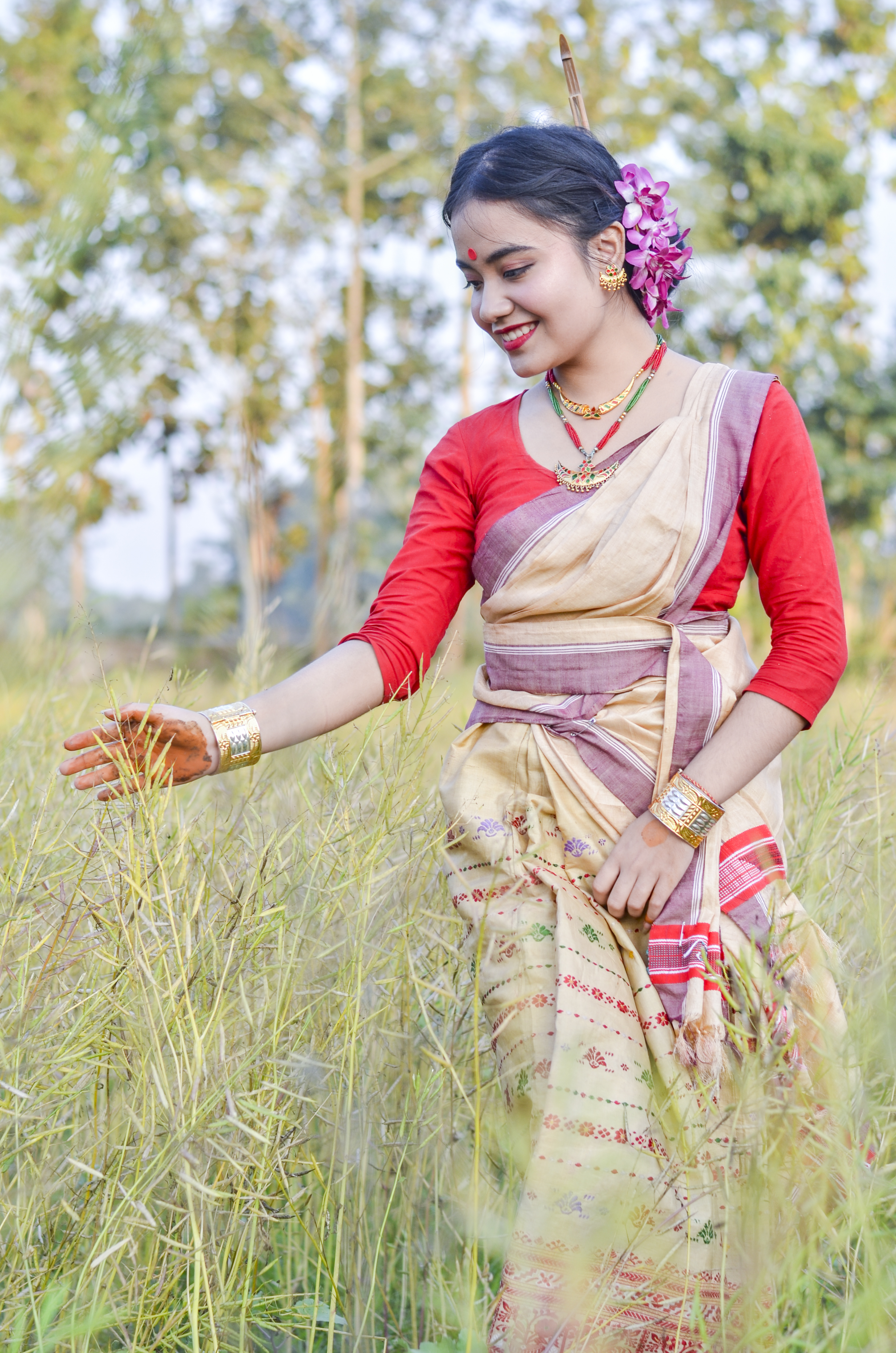
Assamese girl in traditional bihu costume.

Bihu is performed by groups of young men and women, and in earlier times, it served principally as a courtship dance. The Bihu dance's association with fertility refers to both human fertility, through the erotic nature of the dance, as well as the fertility of nature, meaning the celebration of spring and the welcoming of the life-giving spring rain. The use of instruments such as drums and hornpipes is believed to replicate the sound of rain and thunder as a way of invoking actual precipitation.

Historically, there is evidence that the Bihu dance was looked down upon in Assamese society, especially during colonial times, because of the sexually charged nature of the performance, which clashed with the Victorian views that were dominant at the time among British colonists. Presently, the Bihu dance is a cultural emblem in modern-day Assamese society, becoming a symbol of the Assamese cultural identity. The first time that the Bihu dance was performed on a stage was in 1962, as part of a cultural event that took place in Guwahati.

== Mega Bihu Event ==
Assam state has made a Guinness world record for performing the largest Bihu dance in one single venue on April 14, 2023. The event took place at Indira Gandhi Athletic Stadium, Guwahati Assam. A group of 11,000 Bihu dancers and drummers participated.

== See also ==
- Culture of Assam
- Bihu festivals

== Bibliography ==
- Barua, Maan (2009-08-01). "Ecological Basis of the Bihu Festival of Assam". Folklore. 120 (2): 213–223. doi:10.1080/00155870902969400. ISSN 0015-587X. S2CID 162337950.
- Goswami, Prafulladatta (1967). "Hindu and Tribal Folklore in Assam". Asian Folklore Studies. 26 (1): 19–27. doi:10.2307/1177697. JSTOR 1177697.
