= Magh Bihu =

Harvest festival in Assam, India

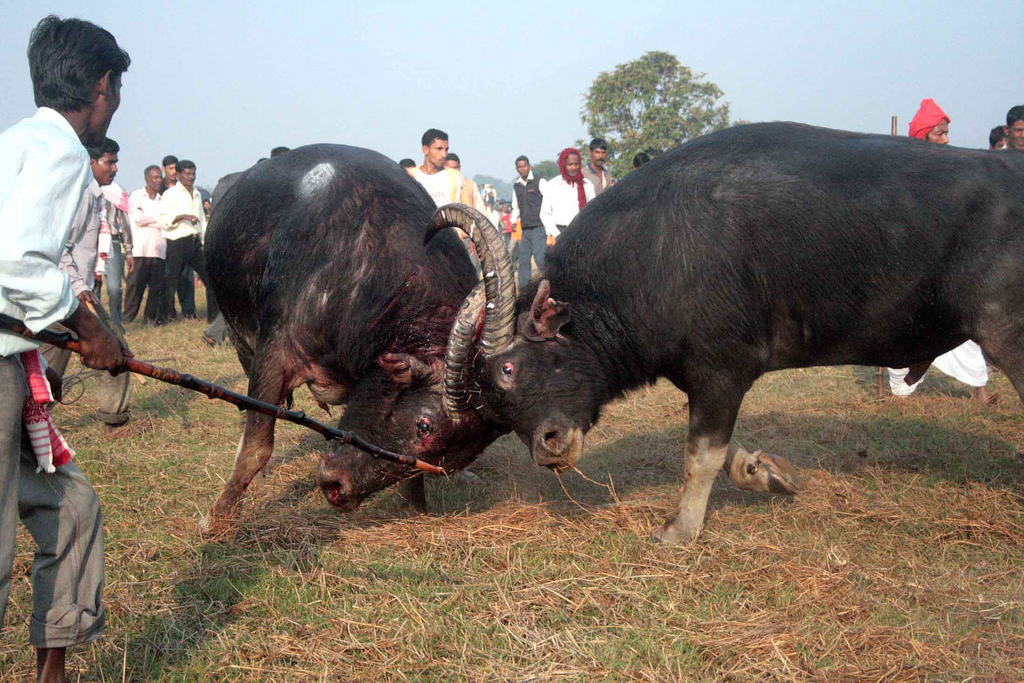
- Asian water buffalo fight held at Nagaon District of Assam, on the occasion of Magh Bihu
- Official name: Bhogali Bihu
- Also called: Maghar Domahi, Magh Bihu
- Observed by: People of Assam and other North eastern states
- Celebrations: Meji, Bhela Ghor
- Begins: 14 January
- Ends: 15 January
- Date: 13,14 and 15 January
- Duration: 2 days
- Frequency: Annual
- Related to: Harvest festival, Bihu, Makar Sankranti, Sangken

Magh Bihu (also called Bhogali Bihu (of eating Bhog i.e. enjoyment) or Maghar Domahi is a harvest festival celebrated in Assam, North-East India, which marks the end of harvesting season in the month of Magh (January–February). A bonfire (Meji) is lit for the ceremonial conclusion and prayer to the God of Fire. The festival is developed by the Tibeto-Burman cultures and festivals Magan of Kachari.

== Overview (Rituals) ==
The festival is marked by feasts and bonfires. Young people erect makeshift huts, known as Meji and Bhelaghar, from bamboo, leaves and thatch, and in Bhelaghar they eat the food prepared for the feast, and then burn the huts the next morning. The celebrations also feature traditional Assamese games such as ‘’tekeli bhonga’’ (pot-breaking) and buffalo fighting. Magh Bihu celebrations start on the last day of the previous month, the month of "Pooh", usually the 29th of Pooh is 14 January, and is the only day of Magh Bihu in modern times (earlier, the festival would last for the whole month of Magh, and so the name Magh Bihu). The night before is "Uruka" (28th of Pooh), when people gather around a bonfire, cook dinner, and make merry.

During Magh Bihu, people of Assam make rice cakes with various names such as Sunga Pitha, Til Pitha etc. and some other sweets of coconut called Laru.

== Uruka or Bihu Eve (Beginning) ==
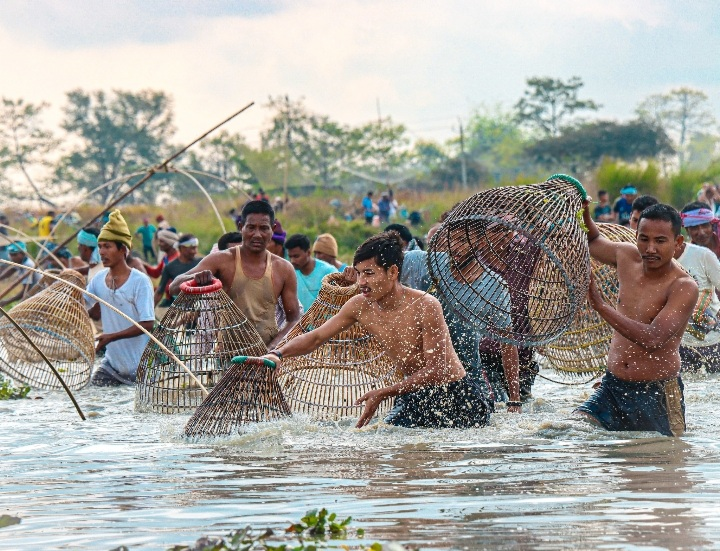
Group fishing In Magh Bihu Uruka.

The first day of Magh Bihu is known as Uruka or the Bihu Eve. The word Uruka is originally derived from the Deori-Chutia word Urukuwa which means "to end", signifying the end of the harvesting season as well the Pausha month. On this day, women folk get ready for the next day with food items like- Chira, Pitha, Laru, Curd. A feast is organised at night known as Bhuj. Various indigenous communities prepare rice beer, which is usually not distilled. This is known as Chuji by the Chutias, Nam-Lao by Tai-Ahom, Zou by Bodos, and Aapong by the Mising. Uruka feasting may be a family affair or communal. After the feasting, the Uruka is over. Hut-like structures called Bhelaghar are also built in the fields where people stay during the night. More often village youth pass the night in the Bhelaghars warming themselves by the fire and making use of the vegetables that they steal from the backyards of villagers which is considered a tradition.

== Day of Magh Bihu (celebration) ==
The day of the Bihu starts at early dawn by a post-harvesting ceremony called "Meji". In this, bonfires are burned in the fields and people pray to their ancestral gods for blessings. The word Meji is originally derived from either the Deori-Chutia word Midi-ye-ji where "Midi" denotes "Ancestral gods", "Ye" means "Fire” and "Ji" means "Fly away" (signifying the worship of ancestral spirits which fly away with the fire), or the Proto-Sino-tibetan word for “Fire” (Meij, མེ in Tibetan, မီး in Burmese). The bonfires are usually made with fireword, green bamboo, hay and dried Banana leaves. People take bath before setting up the bonfire, as a tradition. The ritual of Meji Jwaluwa (Firing the Meji) is very enjoyable. Worshipping the Bhoral and Meji is done by offering Rice cakes, Rice beers, Chira, Pitha, Akhoi, Horoom, Curd, and other eatables. At the end, the Bhelaghar is also burned and people consume a special preparation known as Mah-Karai, which is a roasted mixture of rice, black gram. In the breakfast and lunch, people consume various traditional dishes like various Fish, Duck, Chicken and Mutton curries along with rice, ‘tenga’, ‘aloo pitika’ and ‘doi sira’. The ashes of the bonfire Meji and Bhelaghar are used in the trees and crops to increase the fertility of the gardens or fields.

== Related Festivals ==
Along with the main Me-Ji and Sangken, there are many related festivals can be seen Assam and Arunachal. On the seventh day of Magh Bihu they clean utensils and sacrifice fowls to Bathou, their God and go out carol singing, collecting foods. They set up Bhelaghars and burn them in the morning. In the Full moon day of Magh month, the Khamti people observe a similar Bonfire tradition related to Buddha. Given the fact that no other Tai group follows such ritual, it can be concluded it would be better that the Khamtis merely adopted the ritual from the locals in the 18th century which was later developed into a Buddhist rite, similar to the Kechai-khati worship organised on the same day.

== See also ==
- Bohag Bihu
- Kati Bihu
