= Xutuli =

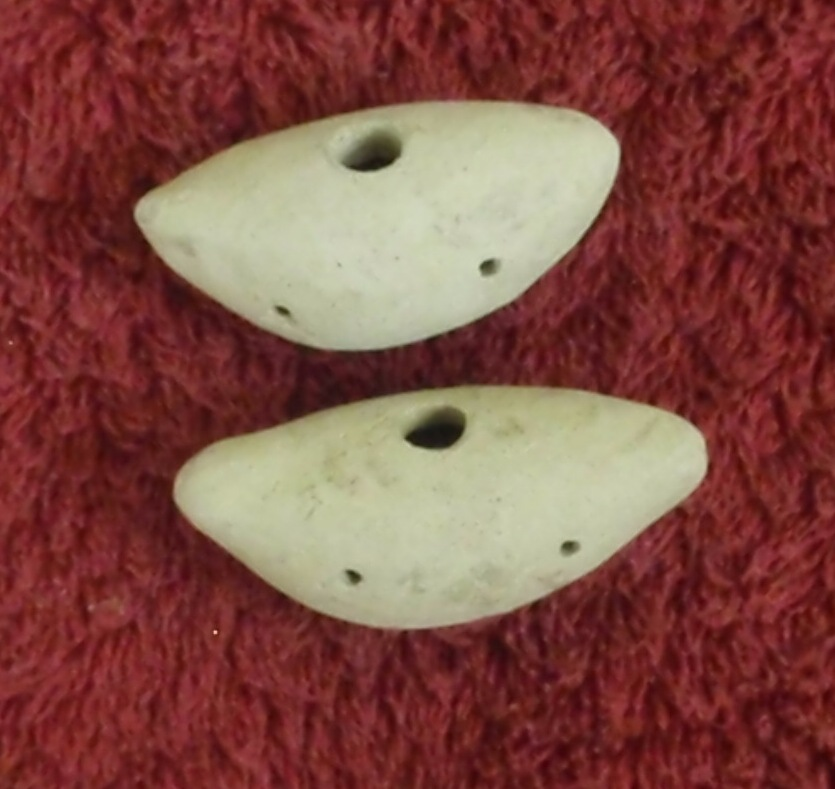
- Xutuli

Related instruments
- Xun (China), Turuli (Dimasa)

Xutuli is a musical instrument used during the Rongali Bihu festival in Assam, India. It can either be made from clay or the lower end of a bamboo tree which is left after the main part falls or is cut off.

== Description ==
The instrument is shaped like a half moon. It is believed that initially instruments of this type developed from the hard shells of fruits like coconut, and then similar shapes were made from potter's clay. These instruments imitate the sounds of animals and birds and produce a flute-like sound. In ancient China a similar instrument was called a Xun.

== History ==
The Xutuli is believed to have been brought by the Sino-Tibetan groups, mainly the Sadiyal Kacharis (Chutias, Deoris, Morans), who brought the instrument along with them from their ancestral lands. The number of holes in the Assamese Xutuli indicates that the Sadiyal Kacharis probably arrived from the Huang He plains before 1600 BC, as the Xuns were standardised with five holes during the Shang dynasty. Xuns during the Xia dynasty had three holes similar to the Xutuli.

From the shape and sound of Xutuli, it can be deduced that this instrument imitates birds. In Assamese folk culture, people believe that the sound of Xutuli invites rain. The sound of Xutuli is also associated as the symbol of respectable hermits, a lady in sorrow, or heroes at the end of their strength.

== Use ==
In Bohag Bihu, Xutuli has an importance of its own. Initially, the cowboys (gorurokhiya lora) used Xutuli as a toy, because of ease of construction . Xutuli is played by both boys and girls in Bihu, but most importantly Xutuli is an indispensable part of Jeng Bihu and Bihuwati dances, and predominantly played by girls. Nowadays every Bihuwati is desired be an accomplished Xutuli player.
