= Bohag Bihu =

Harvest festival celebrated in Assam

Rongali Bihu (Bohag Bihu) Assamese New Year
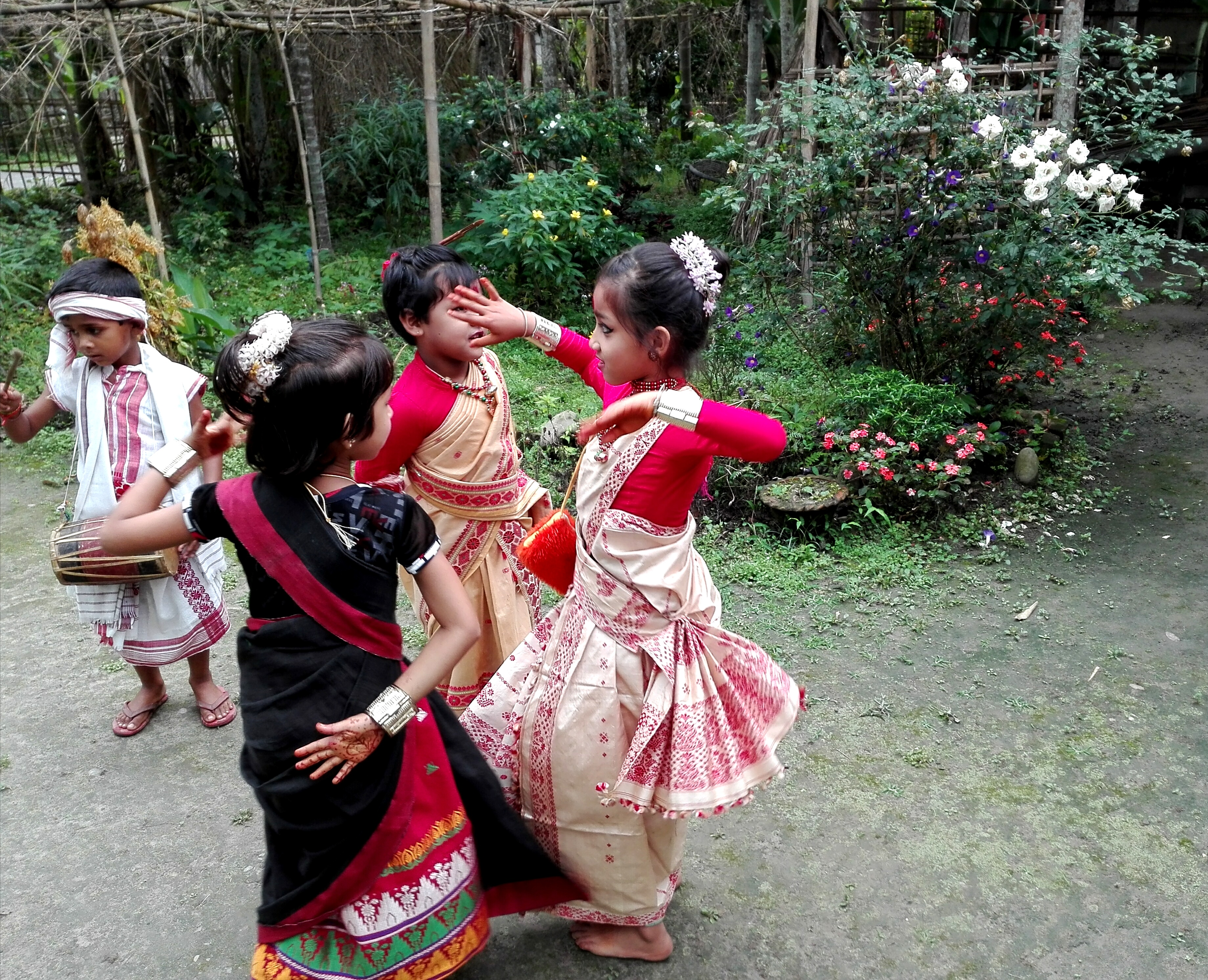
- A group of Children performing 'Husori' during Bohag Bihu.
- Type: Social, Cultural, Religious
- Significance: New Year
- Date: 1st Bohag (13/14 April)
- Frequency: annual
- Related to: South and Southeast Asian solar New Year

Bohag Bihu or Rongali Bihu also called Saat Bihu (seven Bihus) is a traditional ethnic festival celebrated in the Northeastern Indian state of Assam and other parts of Northeastern India by the indigenous ethnic groups of Assam, and marks the beginning of the Assamese New Year. The festival is of mostly aboriginal origin comprising Tibeto-Burman and Tai elements. It usually falls in the 2nd week of April, historically signifying the time of harvest. Every year it falls on the 14th day of April. The holiday unites the different native communities of Assam regardless of their backgrounds and promotes the celebration of ethnic diversity.

Rongali Utsav is a festival organised in Guwahati every year. The festival showcases tribal culture of Assam to the world.

In Assam locally the onset of 'Bohag' (Assamese Calendar) marks the starting of Rongali Bihu. The three primary types of Bihu are Bohag Bihu or Rongali Bihu, Kati Bihu or Kongali Bihu, and Magh Bihu or Bhogali Bihu. Each festival historically recognizes a different agricultural cycle of the paddy crops. During Rongali Bihu there are 7 pinnacle phases: 'Sot', 'Raati', 'Goru', 'Manuh', 'Kutum', 'Mela' and 'Sera'.

== Information ==
- Raati Bihu: This phase begins on the first night of the month of Sot and lasts till Uruka. This phase was usually performed beneath an ancient tree or in an open field illuminated by burning torches. It was celebrated in the villages and was meant as a gathering for the local women. The participation of men was mostly ceremonial where they played a pepa i.e. a buffalo hornpipe. Another notable musical instrument played in this phase was the bholuka baanhor toka which is a split bamboo musical instrument.
- Sot Bihu: Also called Bali Husori, this phase begins on the second day of the month of Sot Mah. On this day Bihu songs and dances are organized by the young at outdoor locations, fields or a naamghor bakori (yard of community prayer hall) till the occurrence of Uruka, the formal beginning of Rongali Bihu.

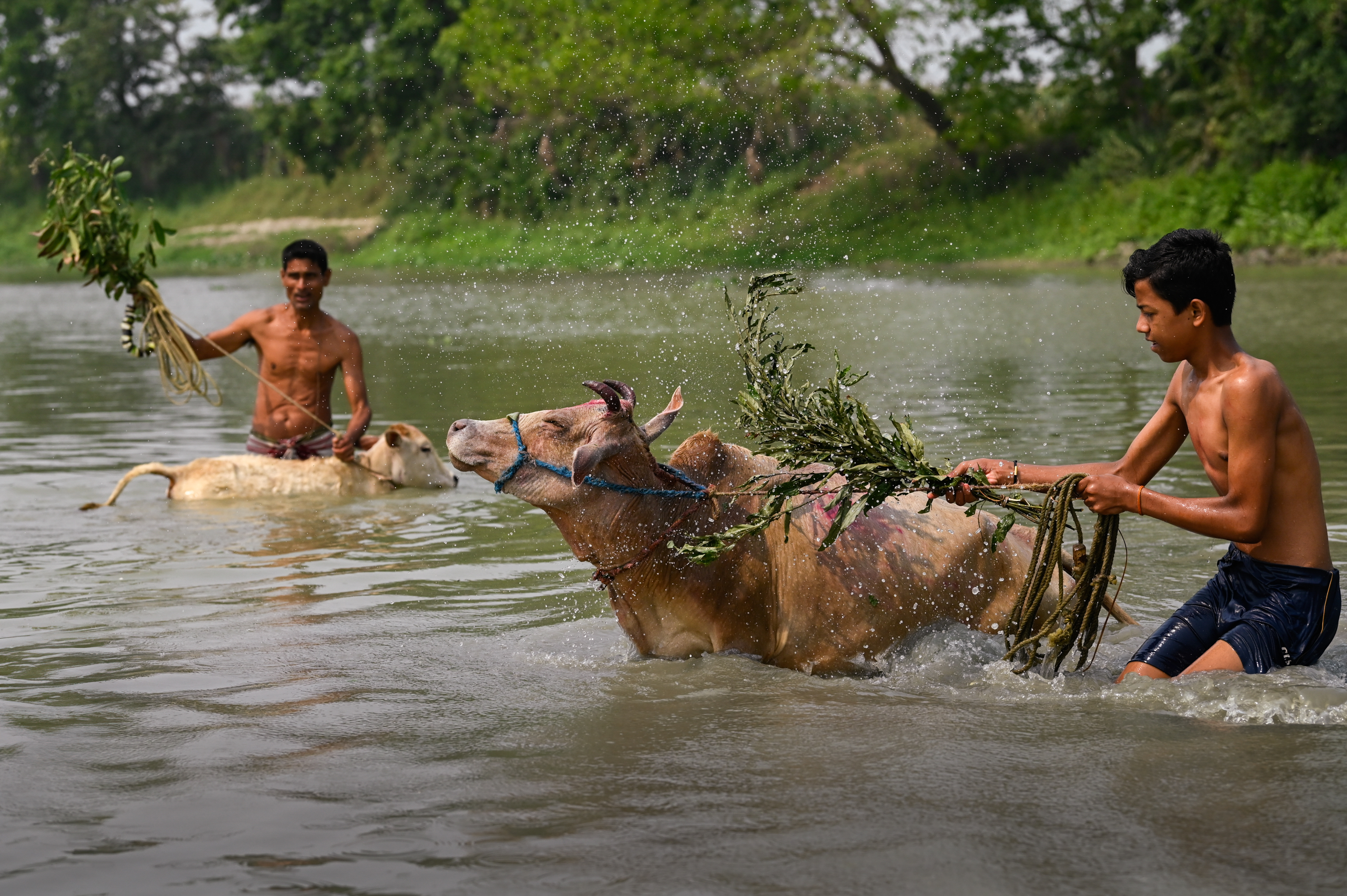
A scene of the ritual washing of cows in the river, their anointing with turmeric paste, and ritual beating with Litsea salicifolia (Dighloti) branches during the festival of Goru Bihu in Mangaldoi district, Assam.

- Goru Bihu: This phase is related to the agricultural roots of Assam and the reverence of livestock which provided an ancient method of livelihood. On the last date of Sot month i.e. the first day of Rongali Bihu is dedicated to the caring upkeep of livestock and a cattle show. Typically the collective cattle of a village are brought to a water source like a pond or a river. The cattle are washed with a combination of symbolic herbs : maah-halodhi (black gram and turmeric paste), whipped dighloti (litsea salicifolia, a plant with long leaf), makhioti (flemingia strobilifera, tonglati (a plant with flower like soft plastic butter-fly) and pieces of lau (bottle gourd) and bengena (brinjal). People sing the following passage: "Dighloti dighal paat, maakhi marru jaat jaat; lau khaa bengena khaa, bosore bosore bardhi jaa, maare xaru baapere xoru toi hobi bor bor goru" . This is roughly translated as : "With our herbs and the leaves of dighloti, we drive away the flies which disturb you; we hope you accept our offering of brinjals and gourds, and continue to grow every year; and may you outgrow your parents". After washing the cattle, the remaining branches of dighloti-makhioti and lau-bengena chat etc. are hung on the roof of the cattle ranch signifying their participation. Games are organised which include collecting exho ebidh haak (101 types of vegetables), with variations of activities which may include specifics like gathering amlori tup (larvae of weaver ant, Oecophylla smaragdina), binding betel leaf plants, planting some bamboo roots, and many other symbolic harvest related ritual materials. There is also an occasional food fight, also known as Kori Khel, Paakha Khel and koni-juj. At Dusk, the cattle are paraded back to their ranches. The cattle are decorated with new harnesses, and are fed pitha (the typical Assamese confectionery). The day's end is marked by burning rice bran to create smoke.

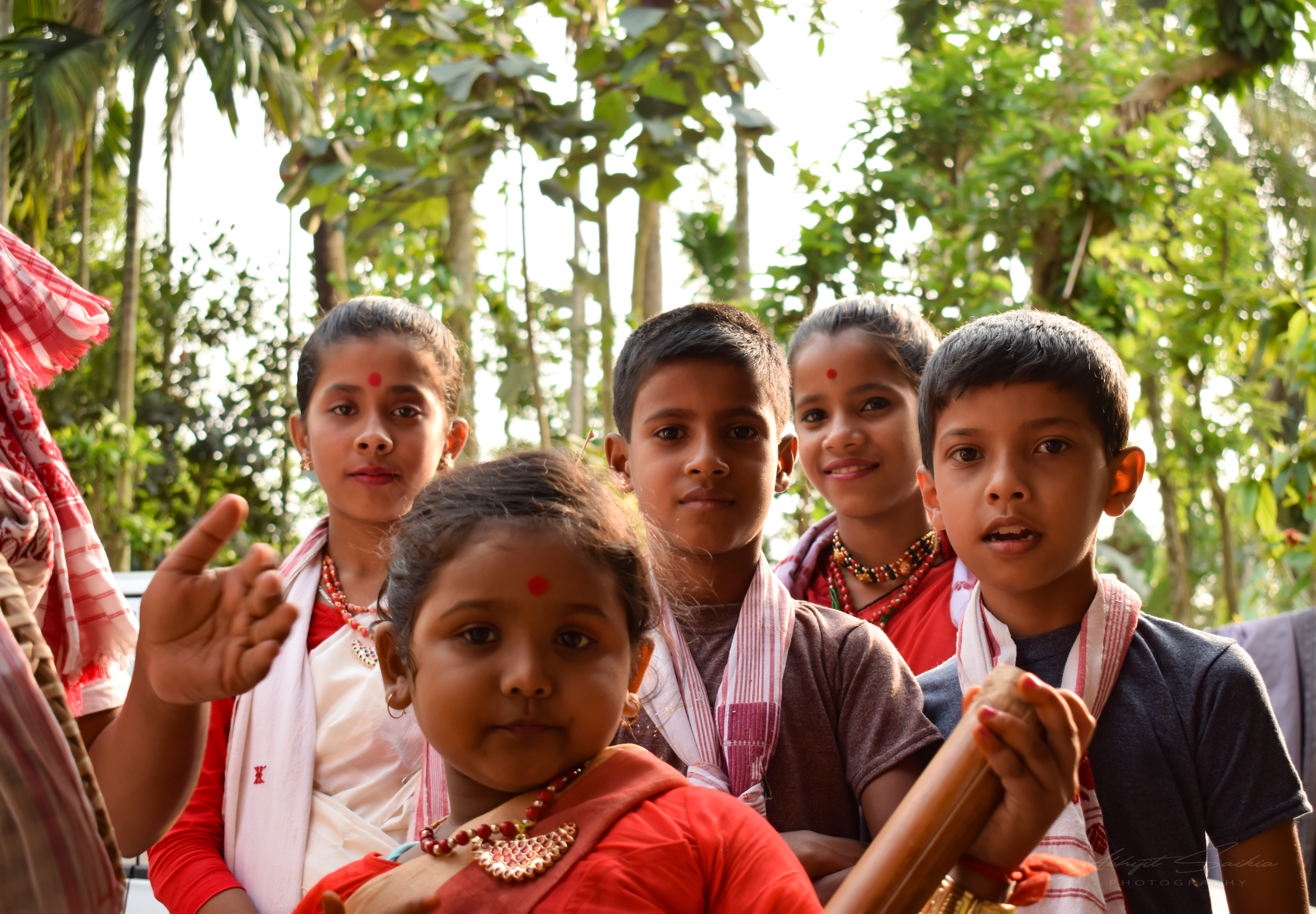
A group of 'Husori' for the occasion of Assamese 'Bohag Bihu' in their traditional attire.

- Manuh Bihu: The first day of the Bohag month marks Manuh Bihu ('Manuh' symbolises "Elders" and Ancestral Spirits). People give offerings to the elders and the ancestral spirits and ask for blessings. People have a special maah halodhi bath, put on new clothes and light saki at Gohai Ghor (the household prayer place). "Manuh Bihu" involves the tradition of seeking blessings from the elders in a family and presenting the ceremonial patch of Bihuwan or the Gamusa cloth, as a gift, to be worn as a symbol of cultural pride. A 'Gamusa' is an indispensable part of indigenous Assamese life and culture with its distinctive symbolic significance. The intricacy of its handcrafting symbolically historically heralded of the ideas of friendship, love, regards, warmth, hospitality and it is intimately woven into the social fabric of Assam.
- Kutum Bihu: The second date of Bohag Mah is Kutum Bihu ("Kutum" symbolises "Kin"). On this day people visit their families, relatives and friends and have lunch or dinner together and share news and stories.
- Mela Bihu: The third day of Bihu is marked by the celebration of Bihu with cultural events and competitions in outdoor locales (Mela symbolises "Fair"). In the ancient days, the King and his staff used to come out to such fairs or bihutolis to mingle in the Bihu celebrations. This tradition of events is continued till date with Bihu Melas or Bihu functions. The fairs are attended by people from all over Assam and are aimed at fostering an atmosphere of the communal brotherhood and the inclusion of everyone.
- Sera Bihu: Also called Bohagi Bidai, Phato Bihu it is the fourth and final day of Rongali Bihu. In different regions of Assam, people celebrate it differently but the common theme is wrapping up the celebrations with contemplation and future resolutions. It is marked by the exchange of Pithas made by different families during the Bihu week among their friends and relatives.
