= Erfurt =

Capital of Thuringia, Germany

- City
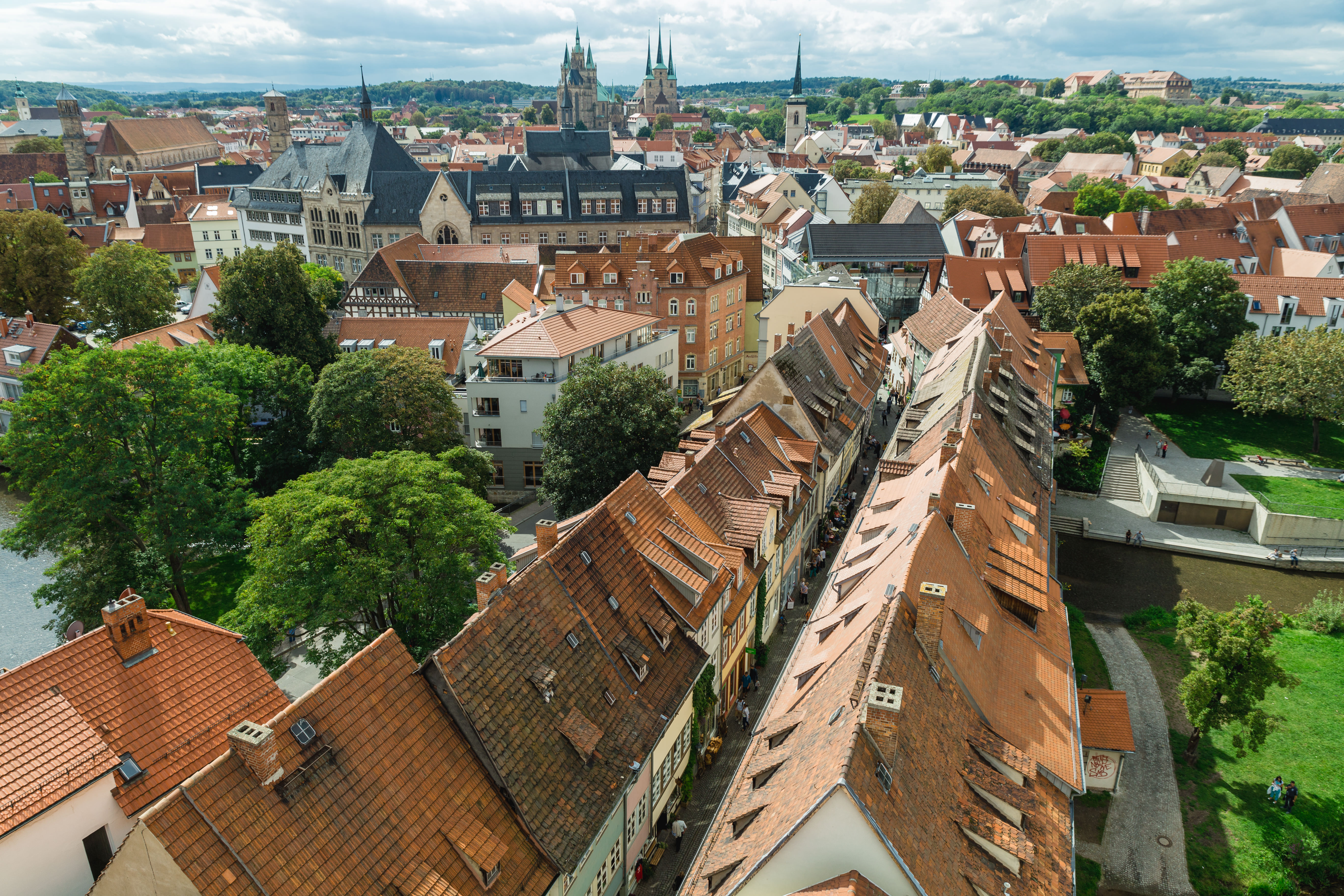
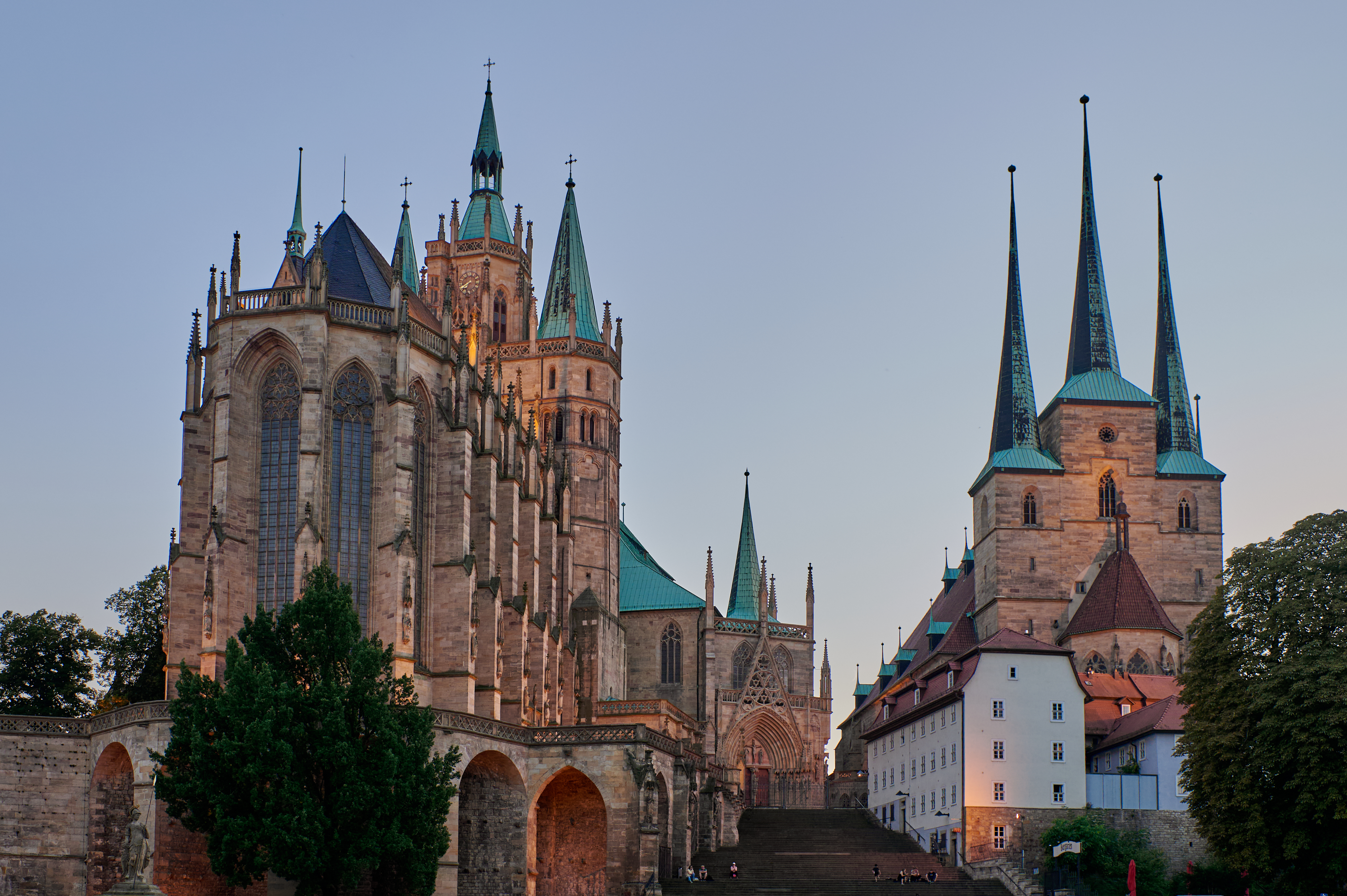
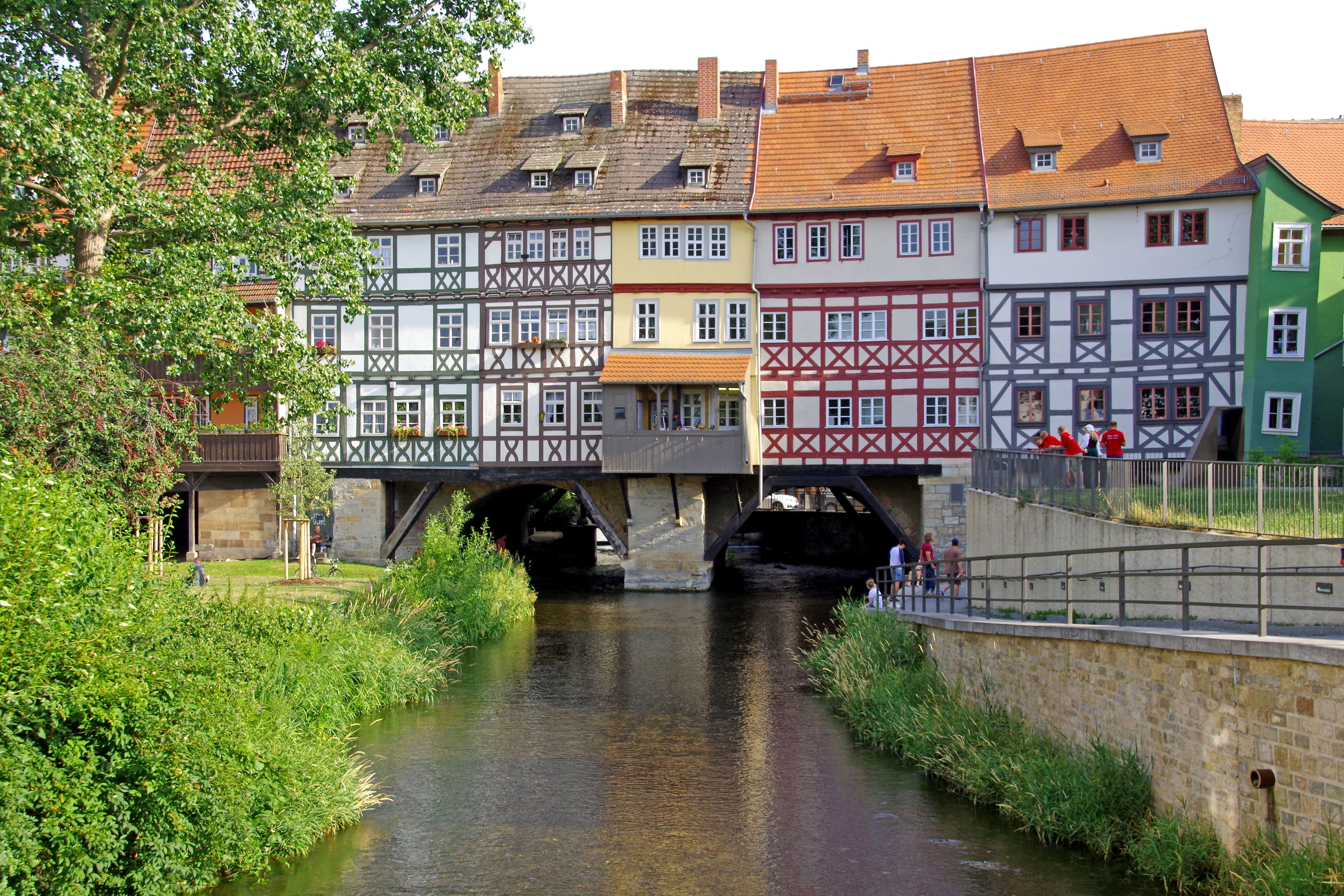
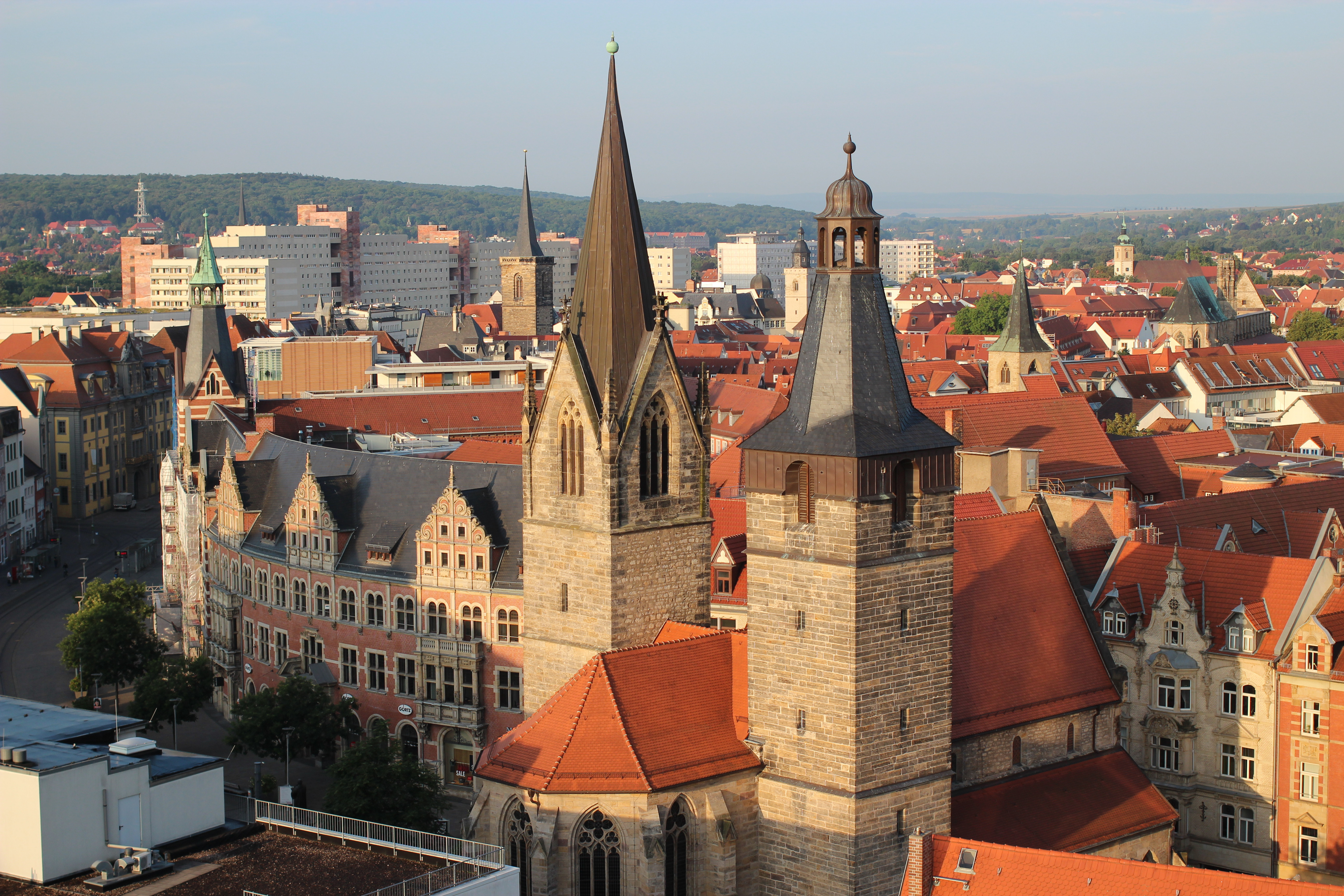
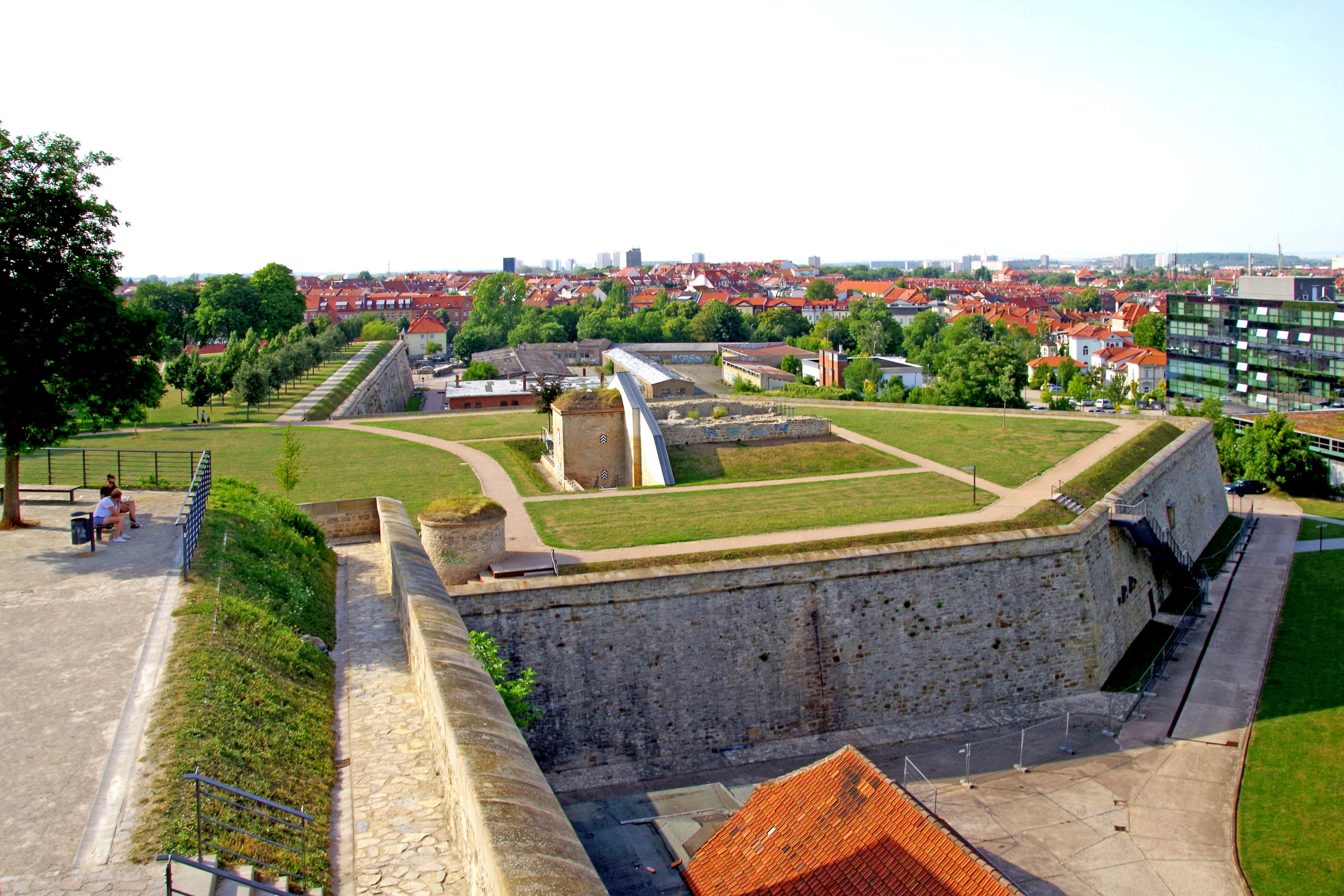
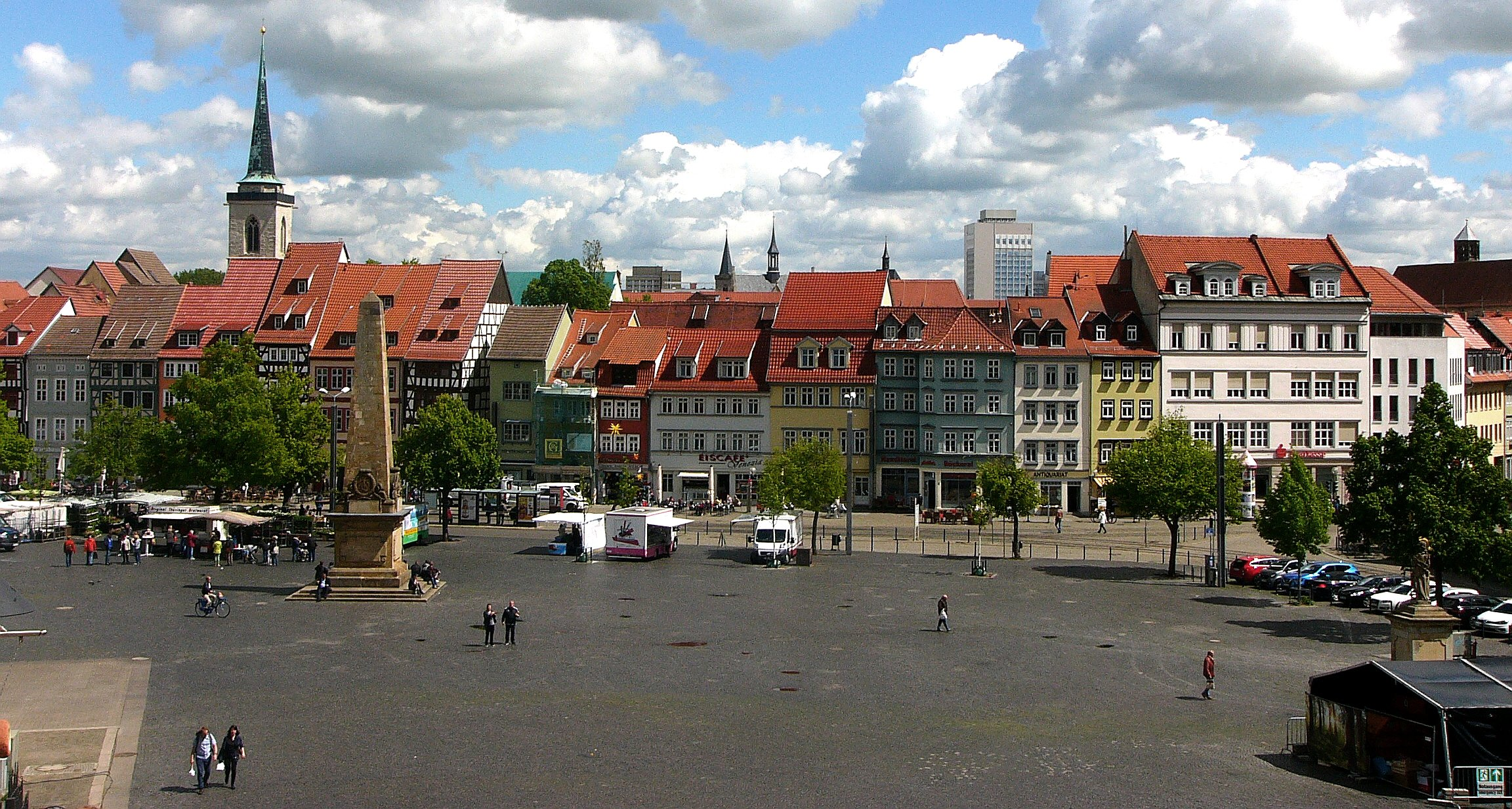
- View over Erfurt Erfurt Cathedral and St Severus' Church Krämerbrücke Kaufmannskirche Petersberg Citadel Cathedral Square

- Flag Coat of arms

- Location of Erfurt within Thuringia
- Interactive map of Erfurt
- Location within Germany Location within Thuringia
- Coordinates: 50°58′41″N 11°01′44″E
- Country: Germany
- State: Thuringia
- District: Urban district
- Founded: 1120
- First mentioned: 742
- Subdivisions: 53 districts

Government
  - Mayor (2024–30): Andreas Horn (CDU)
  - Governing parties: SPD/ Left/ Greens

Area
  - Total: 269.17 km^{2} (103.93 sq mi)
- Elevation: 194 m (636 ft)

Population (2025-12-31)
  - Total: 218,793
  - Density: 812.84/km^{2} (2,105.3/sq mi)
- Time zone: UTC+01:00 (CET)
  - Summer (DST): UTC+02:00 (CEST)
- Postal codes: 99084–99099
- Dialling codes: 0361
- Vehicle registration: EF
- Website: www.erfurt.de/ef/de/index.html

UNESCO World Heritage Site
- Official name: Jewish-Medieval Heritage of Erfurt
- Type: Cultural
- Criteria: iv
- Designated: 2023
- Reference no.: 1656

Erfurt (German: [ˈɛʁfʊʁt]) is the capital and largest city of the Central German state of Thuringia, with a population of around 216,000. It lies in the wide valley of the River Gera, in the southern part of the Thuringian Basin, north of the Thuringian Forest, and in the middle of a line of the six largest Thuringian cities (Thüringer Städtekette), stretching from Eisenach in the west, via Gotha, Erfurt, Weimar and Jena, to Gera in the east. Together with Kassel and Göttingen, it is one of the cities with more than 100,000 inhabitants lying closest to the geographic centre of Germany. Erfurt is 100 km (62 mi) south-west of Leipzig, 250 km (155 mi) north-east of Frankfurt, 300 km (186 mi) south-west of Berlin and 400 km (249 mi) north of Munich.

Erfurt's old town is one of the best preserved medieval city centres in Germany. The Gera is spanned by the Merchants' Bridge (Krämerbrücke), one of the rare bridges with houses built on it. On the Erfurt Cathedral Hill is the ensemble of Erfurt Cathedral—which houses the world's largest free-swinging medieval bell—and St Severus' Church. Petersberg Citadel is one of the largest and best preserved town fortresses in Central Europe. Erfurt's Old Synagogue is the oldest intact synagogue in Europe, and together with the Erfurt Mikveh, which was only rediscovered in 2007, and the Stone House, forms the UNESCO World Heritage Site Jewish-Medieval Heritage of Erfurt.

The city's economy is based on agriculture, horticulture and microelectronics. Its central location has made it a logistics hub for Germany and central Europe. Erfurt hosts the second-largest trade fair in eastern Germany (after Leipzig), as well as the public television children's channel KiKa. The city is on the Via Regia, a medieval trade and pilgrims' road network. Erfurt Main Station is the junction of the Nuremberg–Erfurt and the Erfurt–Leipzig/Halle high-speed lines with the Halle–Bebra railway.

Erfurt was first mentioned in 742, as Saint Boniface founded the diocese. Although the town did not belong to any of the Thuringian states politically, it quickly became the economic centre of the region and was a member of the Hanseatic League. It was part of the Electorate of Mainz during the Holy Roman Empire, and became part of the Kingdom of Prussia in 1802. From 1949 until 1990 Erfurt was part of the German Democratic Republic (East Germany).

The University of Erfurt was founded in 1379, making it the first university to be established within the geographic area which constitutes modern Germany. It closed in 1816 and was re-established in 1994. Martin Luther (1483–1546) was its most famous student, studying there from 1501 before entering St Augustine's Monastery in 1505. Other noted Erfurters include the medieval philosopher and mystic Meister Eckhart (c. 1260–1328), and the Baroque composer Johann Pachelbel (1653–1706).

== History ==
=== Prehistory and antiquity ===
To the west of Erfurt in Frienstedt, a large Germanic village, which was found during the construction of a highway, where the oldest Germanic word ever discovered in Central Germany was found written in runic script on a comb from a sacrificial shaft. From the Roman era, 200 coins dating back to the third century were found, plus 150 Roman ceramic fragments and more than 200 fibulae. 11 inhumation graves of the Haßleben-Leuna group were also discovered.

The Melchendorf dig in the southern city part showed a settlement from the Neolithic period. (Note: As with the case of an anthropomorhic figurine excavated in Erfurt, some researchers including Olaf Höckmann indicated those were intentionally broken, since Neolithic figurines in human figure were found in fragment in high ratio among excavations in central Europe.) The Thuringi inhabited the Erfurt area in c. 480 and gave their name to Thuringia in c. 500.

=== Middle Ages ===
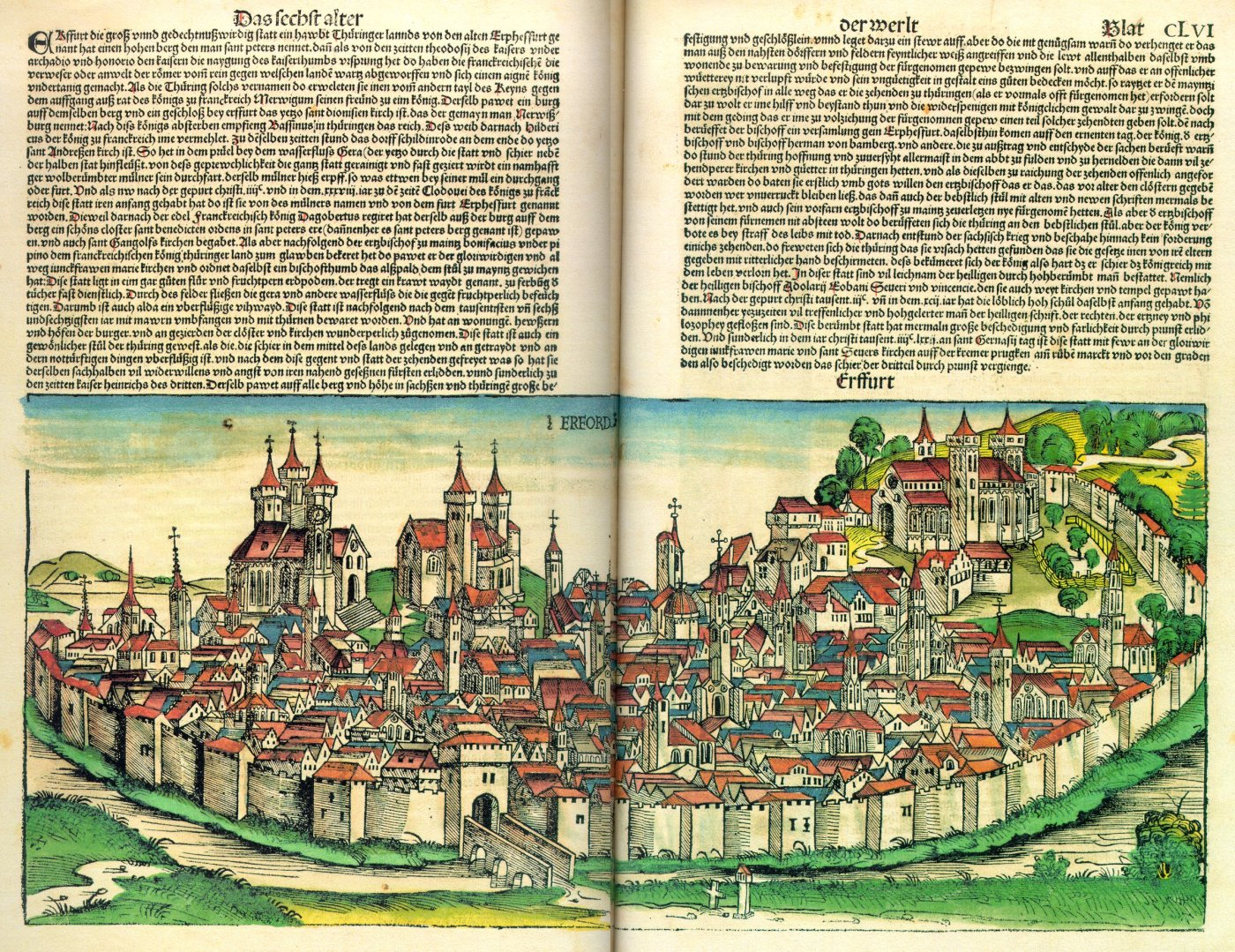
Erfurt, woodcut from the Nuremberg Chronicle, 1493

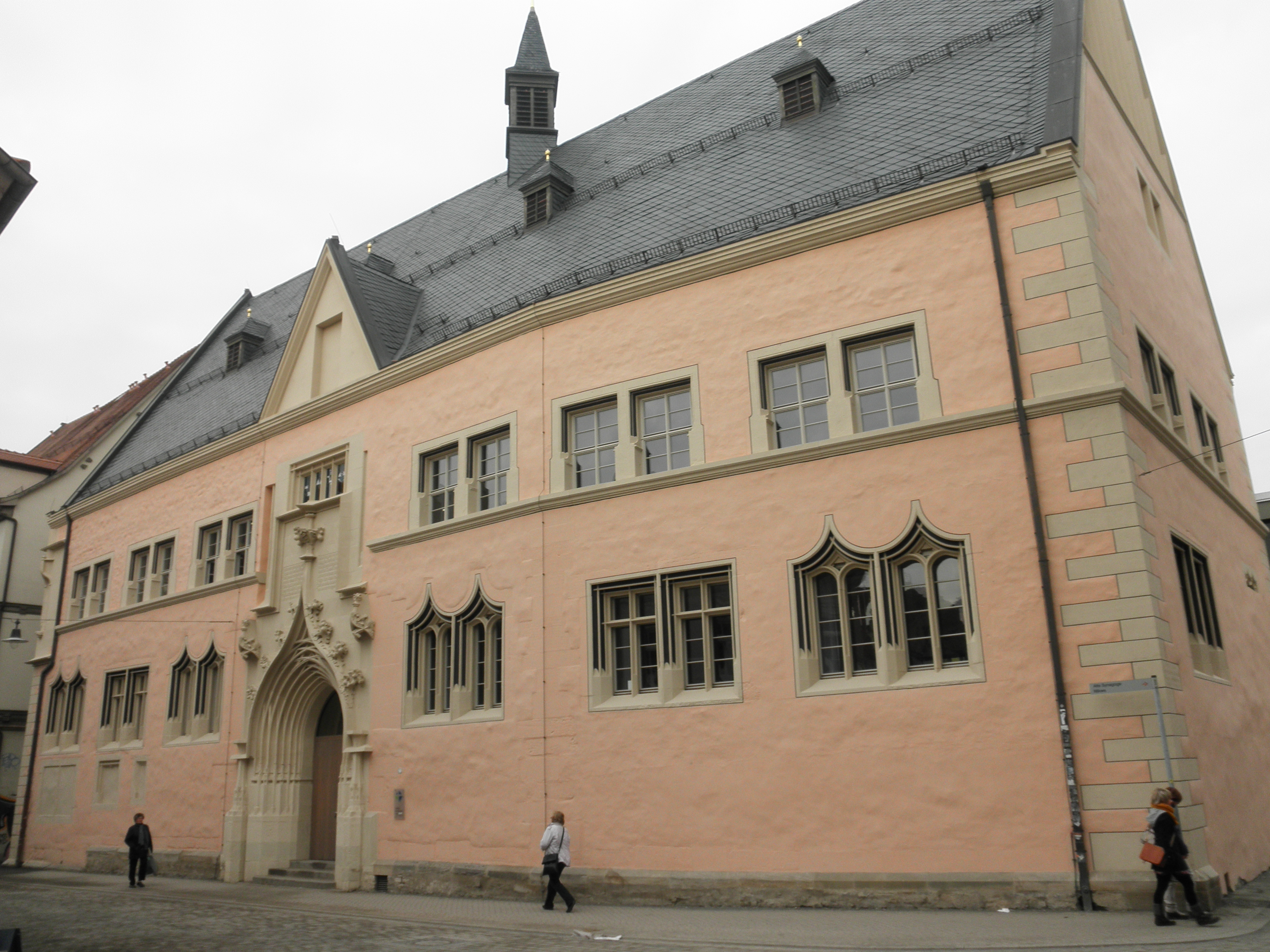
Collegium maius building of the old University of Erfurt (1392)

The town is first mentioned in 742 under the name of "Erphesfurt": in that year, Saint Boniface wrote to Pope Zachary to inform him that he had established three dioceses in central Germany, one of them "in a place called Erphesfurt, which for a long time has been inhabited by pagan natives." All three dioceses (the other two were Würzburg and Büraburg) were confirmed by Zachary the next year, though in 755 Erfurt was brought into the diocese of Mainz. That the place was populous already is borne out by archeological evidence, which includes 23 graves and six horse burials from the sixth and seventh centuries.

Throughout the Middle Ages, Erfurt was an important trading town because of its location, near a ford across the Gera river. Together with the other five Thuringian woad towns of Gotha, Tennstedt, Arnstadt and Langensalza it was the centre of the German woad trade, which made those cities very wealthy. Erfurt was the junction of important trade routes: the Via Regia was one of the most used east–west roads between France and Russia (via Frankfurt, Erfurt, Leipzig and Wrocław) and another route in the north–south direction was the connection between the Baltic Sea ports (e. g. Lübeck) and the potent upper Italian city-states like Venice and Milan.

During the tenth and eleventh centuries both the Emperor and the Electorate of Mainz held some privileges in Erfurt. The German kings had an important monastery on Petersberg hill and the Archbishops of Mainz collected taxes from the people. Around 1100, some people became free citizens by paying the annual "Freizins" (liberation tax), which marks a first step in becoming an independent city. During the 12th century, as a sign of more and more independence, the citizens built a city wall around Erfurt (in the area of today's Juri-Gagarin-Ring). After 1200, independence was fulfilled and a city council was founded in 1217; the town hall was built in 1275. In the following decades, the council bought a city-owned territory around Erfurt which consisted at its height of nearly 100 villages and castles and even another small town (Sömmerda). Erfurt became an important regional power between the Landgraviate of Thuringia around, the Electorate of Mainz to the west and the Electorate of Saxony to the east. Between 1306 and 1481, Erfurt was allied with the two other major Thuringian cities (Mühlhausen and Nordhausen) in the Thuringian City Alliance and the three cities joined the Hanseatic League together in 1430. A peak in economic development was reached in the 15th century, when the city had a population of 20,000 making it one of the largest in Germany. Between 1432 and 1446, a second and higher city wall was established. In 1483, a first city fortress was built on Cyriaksburg hill in the southwestern part of the town.

In the year 1184, Erfurt was the location of a notable accident called the Erfurter Latrinensturz ('Erfurt latrine fall'). King Henry VI held council in a building of the Erfurt Cathedral to negotiate peace between two of his vassals, Archbishop Konrad I of Mainz and Landgrave Ludwig III of Thuringia. The amassed weight of all the gathered men proved too heavy for the floor to bear, which collapsed. According to contemporary accounts, dozens of people fell to their death into the latrine pit below. Ludwig III, Konrad I and Henry VI survived the affair.

The Jewish community of Erfurt was founded in the 11th century. Together with the Jewish communities in Mainz, Worms and Speyer, it became one of the most influential in Germany. The Old Synagogue is still extant and is a museum today, as is the mikveh at Gera river near Krämerbrücke. In 1349, during the wave of Black Death Jewish persecutions across Europe, the Jews of Erfurt were rounded up, with more than 100 killed and the rest driven from the city. Before the persecution, a wealthy Jewish merchant buried his property in the basement of his house. In 1998, this treasure was found during construction works. The Erfurt Treasure with various gold and silver objects is shown in the exhibition in the synagogue today. Only a few years after 1349, the Jews moved back to Erfurt and founded a second community, which was disbanded by the city council in 1454. Because of their exceptional testimony to the life of a medieval Jewish community, the Jewish sites in Erfurt were inscribed on the UNESCO World Heritage List in 2023.

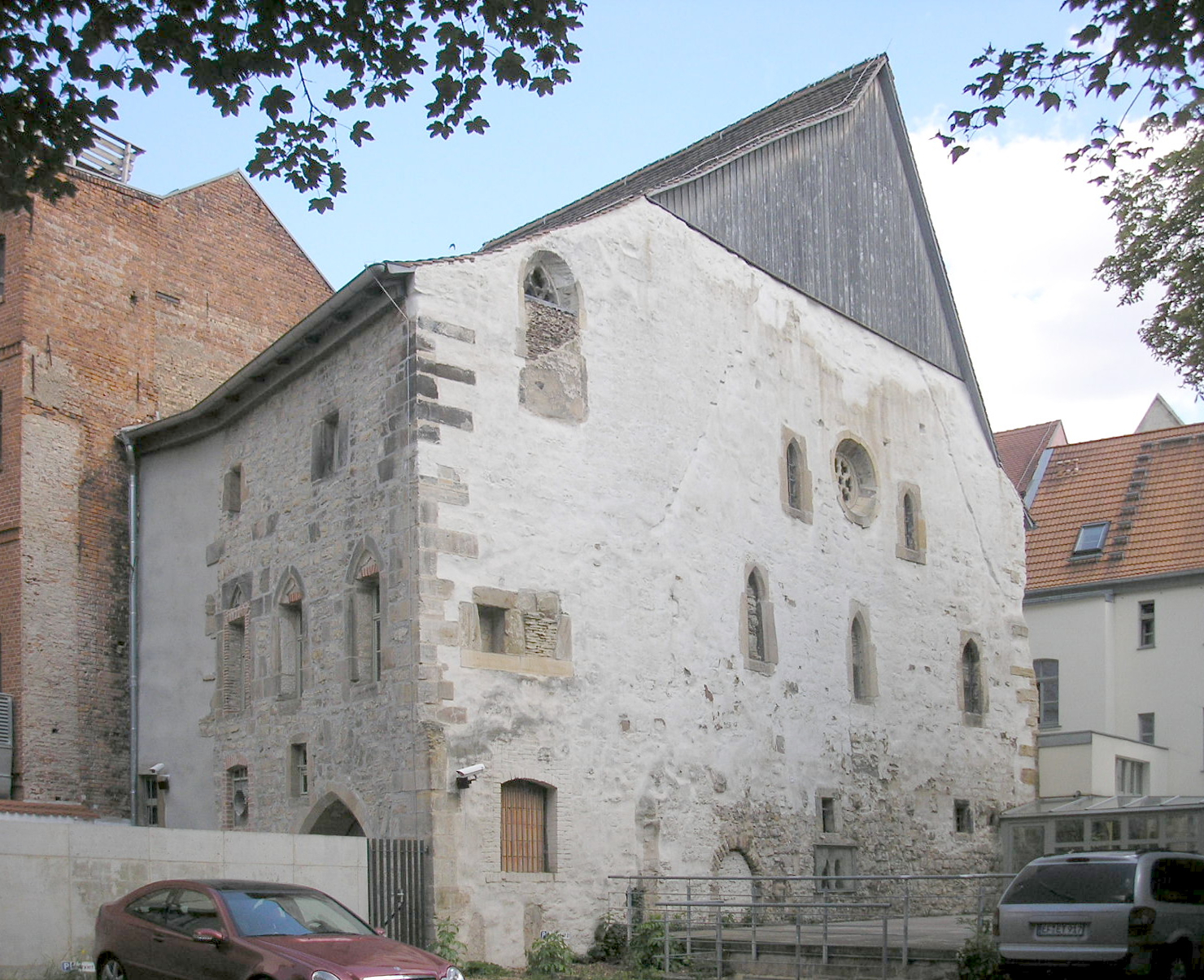
Old Synagogue, the oldest in Europe (1094)

In 1379, the University of Erfurt was founded. Together with the University of Cologne it was one of the first city-owned universities in Germany, while they were usually owned by the Landesherren. Some buildings of this old university are extant or restored in the "Latin Quarter" in the northern city centre (like Collegium Maius, student dorms "Georgenburse" and others, the hospital and the church of the university). The university quickly became a hotspot of German cultural life in Renaissance humanism with scholars like Ulrich von Hutten, Helius Eobanus Hessus and Justus Jonas.

=== Early modern period ===
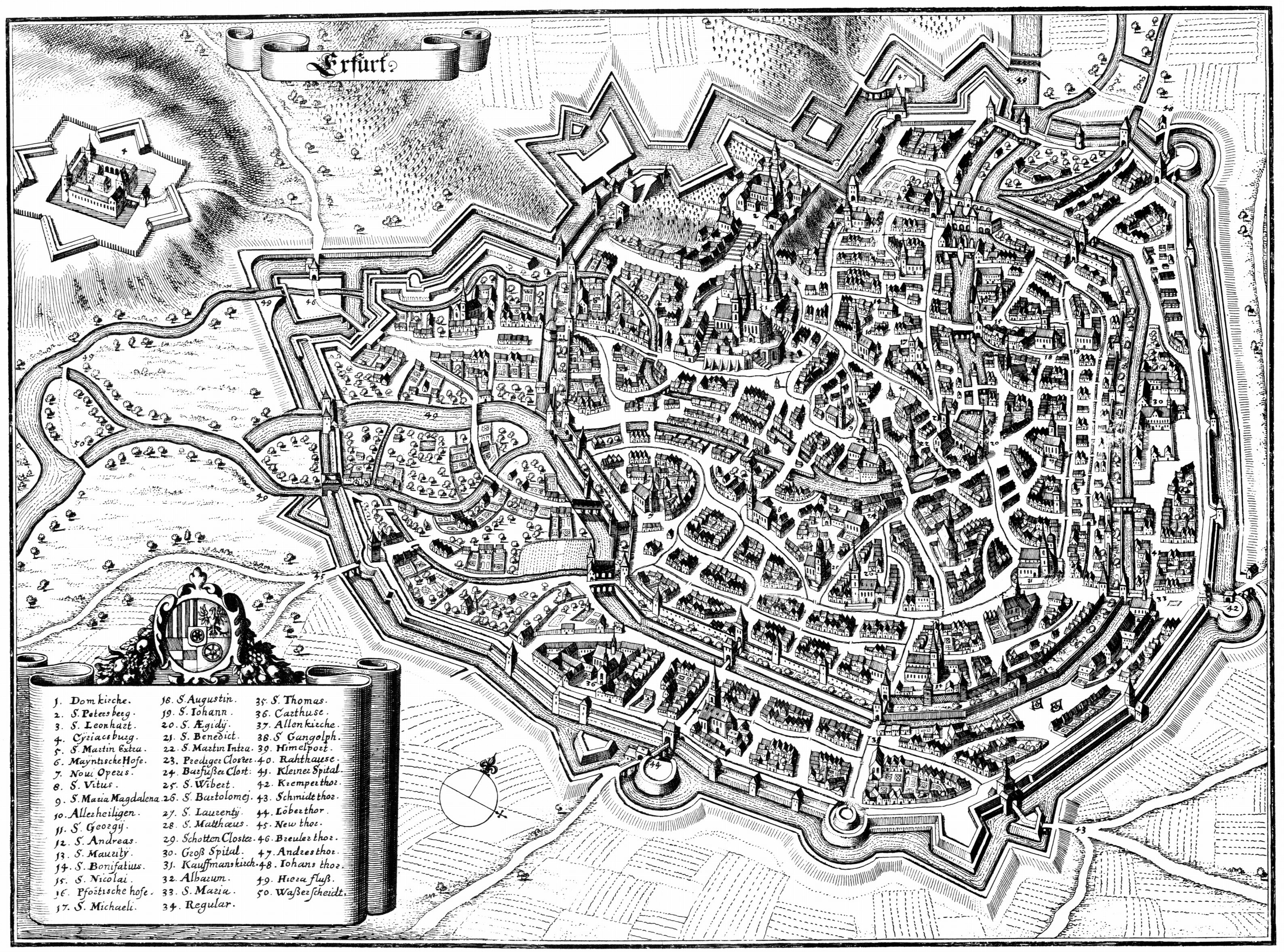
Erfurt in 1650

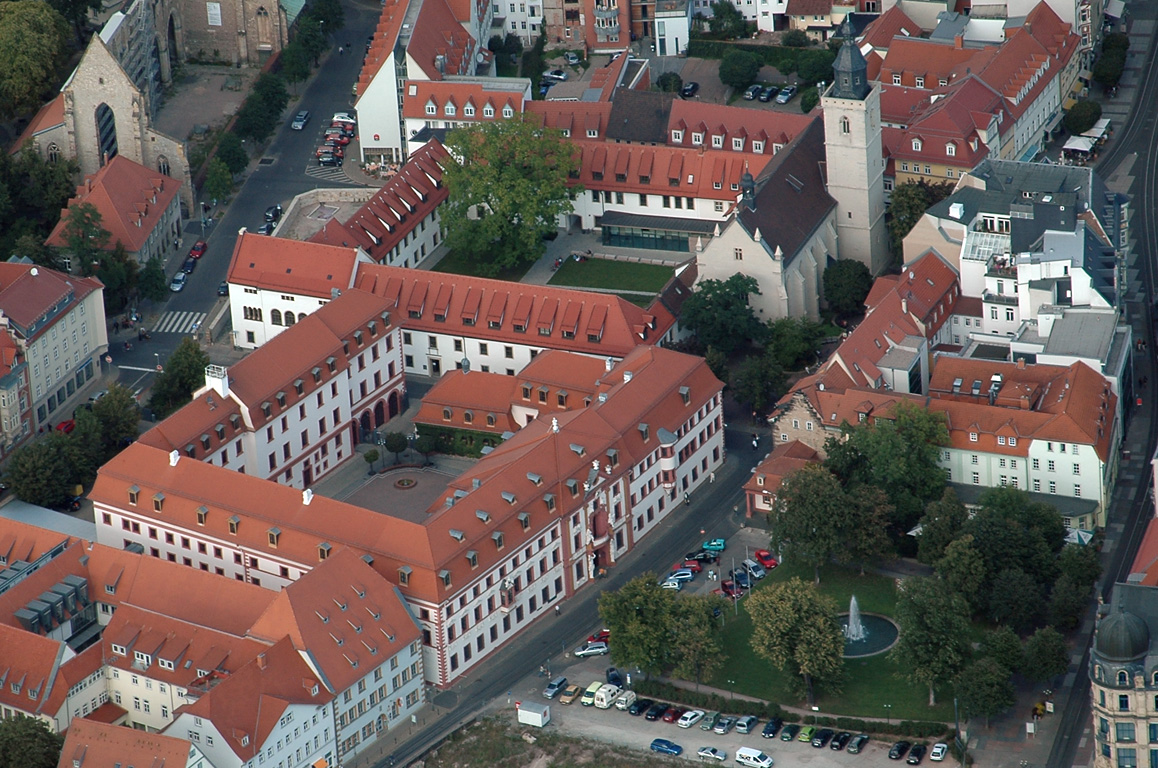
Kurmainzische Statthalterei, seat of the governors of Erfurt (at front)

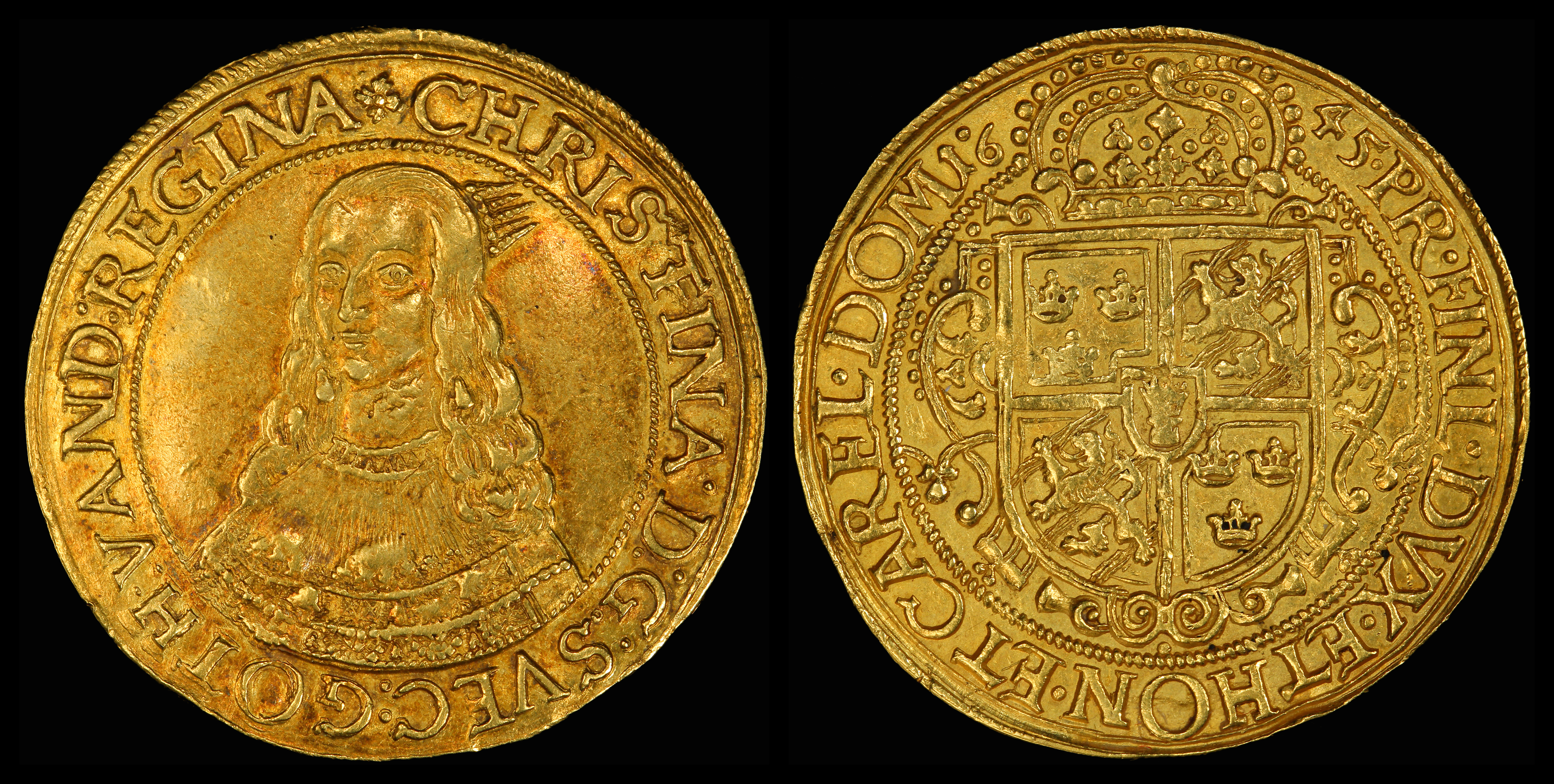
Christina, Queen of Sweden, depicted on a 1645 Erfurt 10 ducat coin (Note: Between 1631 and 1648, during the Thirty Years' War, Erfurt was occupied by Swedish forces, thus the effigy of Queen Christina appears on the 1645 Erfurt 10 Ducat (Portugaloser). There are seven gold coins known to exist bearing the effigy of Queen Christina: a unique 1649 five ducat, and six 1645 10 ducat specimen.)

In 1501 Martin Luther (1483–1546) moved to Erfurt and began his studies at the university. After 1505, he lived at St. Augustine's Monastery as a friar. In 1507 he was ordained as a priest in Erfurt Cathedral. He moved permanently to Wittenberg in 1511. Erfurt was an early adopter of the Protestant Reformation, in 1521.

In 1530, the city became one of the first in Europe to be officially bi-confessional with the Hammelburg Treaty. It kept that status through all the following centuries. The later 16th and the 17th century brought a slow economic decline of Erfurt. Trade shrank, the population was falling and the university lost its influence. The city's independence was endangered. In 1664, the city and surrounding area were brought under the dominion of the Electorate of Mainz and the city lost its independence. The Electorate built a huge fortress on Petersberg hill between 1665 and 1726 to control the city and instituted a governor to rule Erfurt.

In 1682 and 1683 Erfurt experienced the worst plague years in its history. In 1683 more than half of the population died because of the deadly disease.

In Erfurt, witch-hunts are known to have taken place from 1526 to 1700. There are 18 records of trials for witchcraft in this period.

During the late 18th century, Erfurt saw another cultural peak. Governor Karl Theodor Anton Maria von Dalberg had close relations with Johann Wolfgang von Goethe, Friedrich Schiller, Johann Gottfried Herder, Christoph Martin Wieland and Wilhelm von Humboldt, who often visited him at his court in Erfurt.

=== Erfurt during the Napoleonic Wars ===
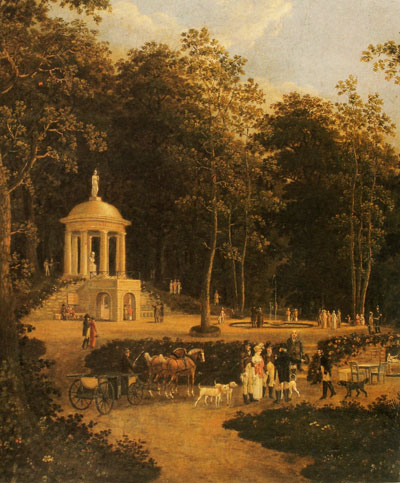
Die Napoleonshöhe im Steiger bei Erfurt, painted by Nikolaus Dornheim in 1812. Inaugurated in March 1811 to celebrate Napoleon's birthday, this Greek-style temple with grotto, flowerbeds and fountain in the Stiegerwald was burned in November 1813 and completely destroyed by Erfurters and their besiegers in 1814.

Erfurt became part of the Kingdom of Prussia in 1802, to compensate for territories Prussia lost to France on the Left Bank of the Rhine. In the Capitulation of Erfurt, the city, its 12,000 Prussian and Saxon defenders under William VI, Prince of Orange-Nassau, 65 artillery pieces, and the Petersberg Citadel and Cyriaksburg Citadel Cyriaksburg, were handed over to the French on 16 October 1806. At the time of the capitulation, Joachim Murat, Marshal of France, had about 16,000 troops near Erfurt. With the attachment of the Saxe-Weimar territory of Blankenhain, the city became part of the First French Empire in 1806 as the Principality of Erfurt, directly subordinate to Napoleon as an "imperial state domain" (French: domaine réservé à l'empereur), separate from the Confederation of the Rhine, which the surrounding Thuringian states had joined. Erfurt was administered by a civilian and military Senate (Finanz- und Domänenkammer Erfurt) under a French governor, based in the Kurmainzische Statthalterei, previously the seat of the city's governor under the Electorate. Napoleon first visited the principality on 23 July 1807, inspecting the citadels and fortifications. In 1808, the Congress of Erfurt was held with Napoleon and Alexander I of Russia visiting the city.

During their administration, the French introduced street lighting and a tax on foreign horses to pay for maintaining the road surface. The Peterskirche suffered under the French occupation, with its inventory being auctioned off to other local churches – including the organ, bells and even the tower of the Corpus Christi chapel (Fronleichnamskapelle) – and the former monastery's library being donated to the University of Erfurt (and then to the Boineburg Library when the university closed in 1816). Similarly the Cyriaksburg Citadel was damaged by the French, with the city-side walls being partially dismantled in the hunt for imagined treasures from the convent, workers being paid from the sale of the building materials.

In 1811, to commemorate the birth of the Prince Imperial, a 70-foot (21-metre) ceremonial column (Die Napoleonsäule) of wood and plaster was erected on the common. Similarly, the Napoleonshöhe – a Greek-style temple topped by a winged victory with shield, sword and lance and containing a bust of Napoleon sculpted by Friedrich Döll – was erected in the Stiegerwald woods, including a grotto with fountain and flower beds, using a large pond (lavoratorium) from the Peterskirche, inaugurated with ceremony on 14 August 1811 after extravagant celebrations for Napoleon's birthday, which were repeated in 1812 with a concert in the Predigerkirche conducted by Louis Spohr.

With the Sixth Coalition forming after French defeat in Russia, on 24 February 1813 Napoleon ordered the Petersburg Citadel to prepare for siege, visiting the city on 25 April to inspect the fortifications, in particular both Citadels. On 10 July 1813, Napoleon put Alexandre d'Alton, baron of the Empire, in charge of the defences of Erfurt. However, when the French decreed that 1000 men would be conscripted into the Grande Armée, the recruits were joined by other citizens in rioting on 19 July that led to 20 arrests, of whom 2 were sentenced to death by French court-martial; as a result, the French ordered the closure of all inns and alehouses.

Within a week of the Sixth Coalition's decisive victory at Leipzig (16–19 October 1813), however, Erfurt was besieged by Prussian, Austrian and Russian troops under the command of Prussian Lt Gen von Kleist. After a first capitulation signed by d'Alton on 20 December 1813 the French troops withdrew to the two fortresses of Petersberg and Cyriaksburg, allowing for the Coalition forces to march into Erfurt on 6 January 1814 to jubilant greetings; the Napoleonsäule ceremonial column was burned and destroyed as a symbol of the citizens' oppression under the French; similarly the Napoleonshöhe was burned on 1 November 1813 and completely destroyed by Erfurters and their besiegers in 1814. After a call for volunteers 3 days later, 300 Erfurters joined the Coalition armies in France. Finally, in May 1814, the French capitulated fully, with 1,700 French troops vacating the Petersberg and Cyriaksburg fortresses. During the two and a half months of siege, the mortality rate rose in the city greatly; 1,564 Erfurt citizens died in 1813, around a thousand more than the previous year.

After the Congress of Vienna, Erfurt was restored to Prussia on 21 June 1815, becoming the capital of one of the three districts (Regierungsbezirke) of the new Province of Saxony, but some southern and eastern parts of Erfurter lands joined Blankenhain in being transferred to the Grand Duchy of Saxe-Weimar-Eisenach the following September. Although enclosed by Thuringian territory in the west, south and east, the city remained part of the Prussian Province of Saxony until 1944.

=== Since 1815 ===
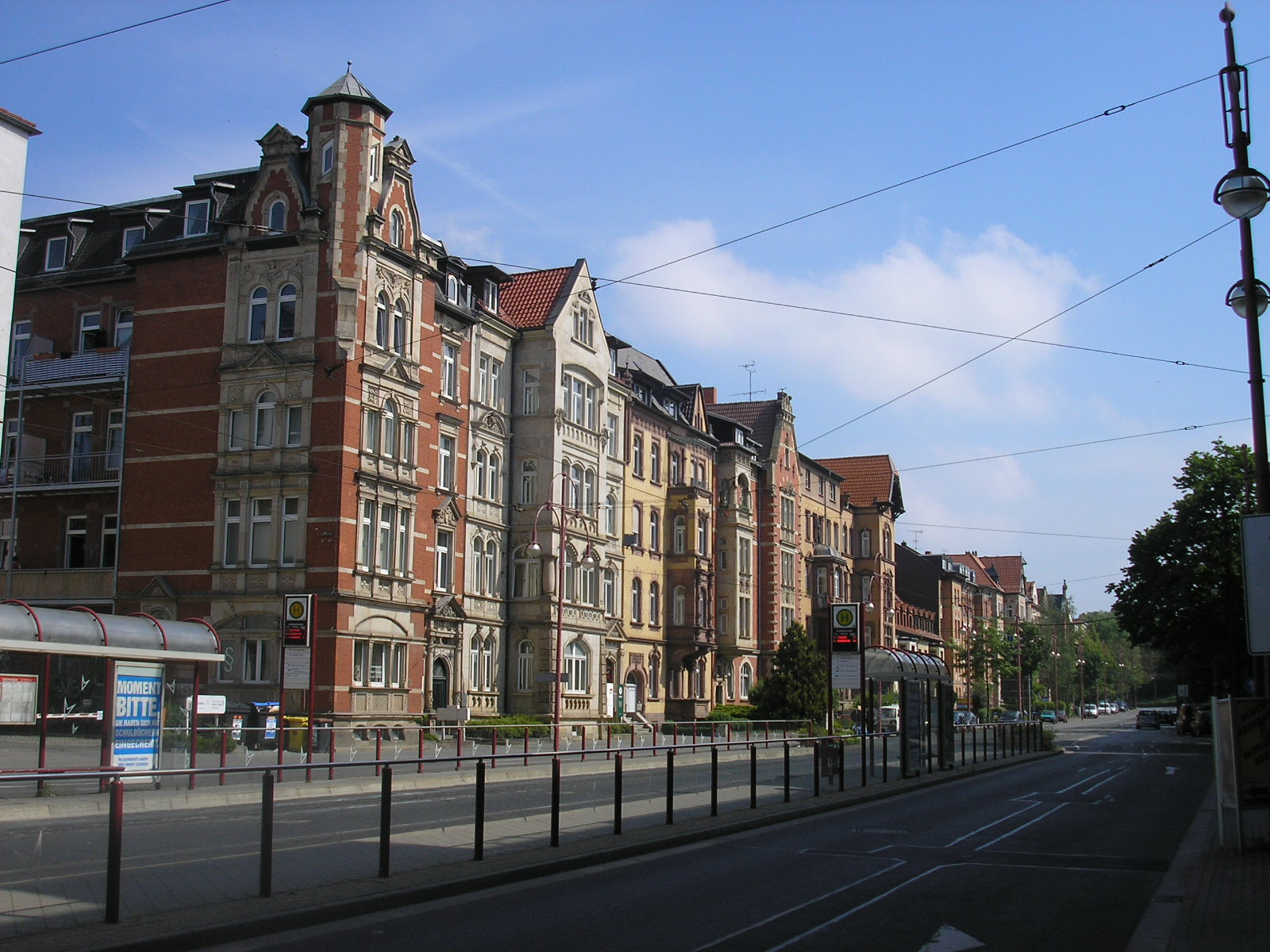
Streetscape in the southern city extension (Gründerzeit style)

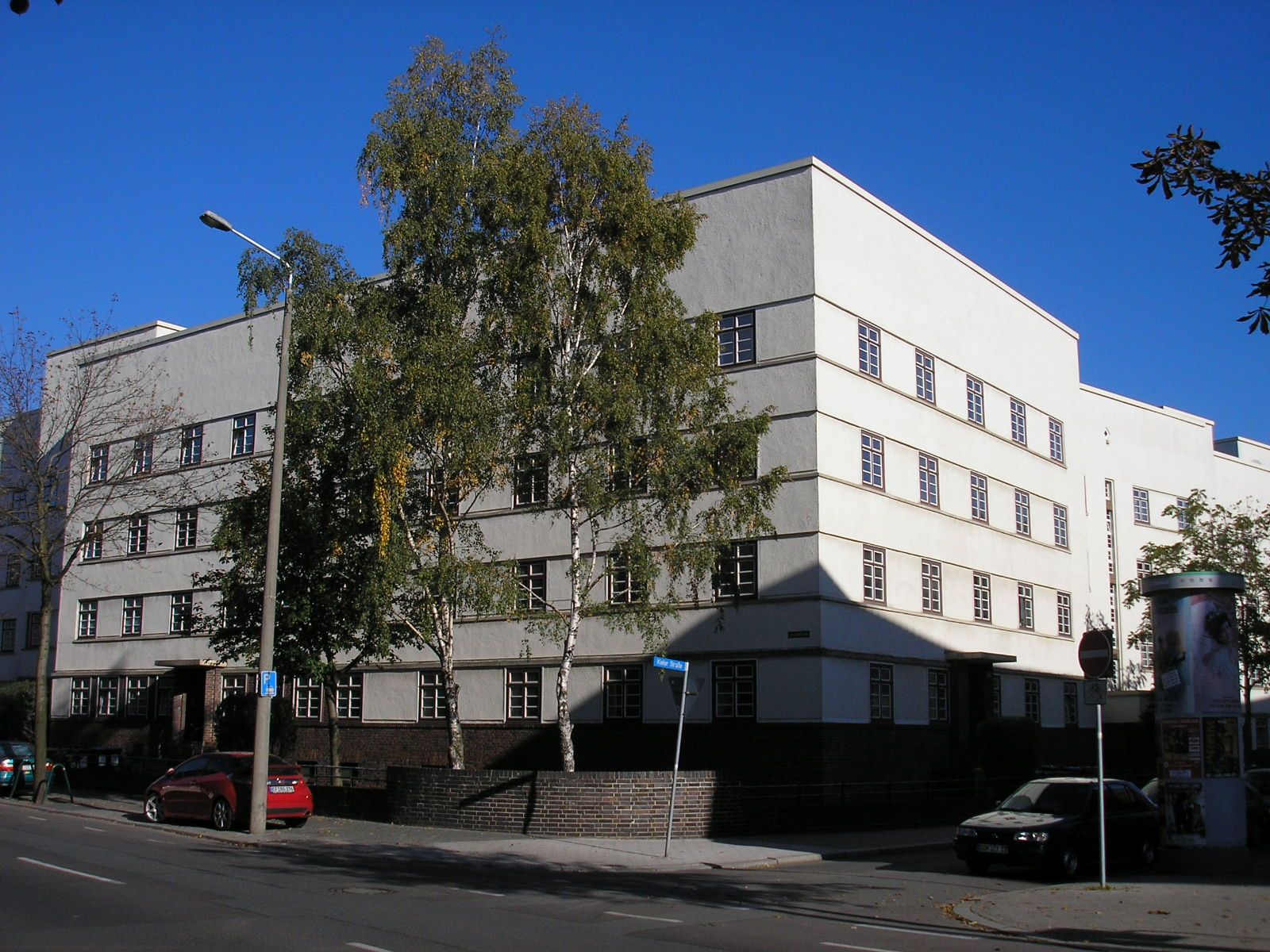
Housing projects in Bauhaus style from 1930

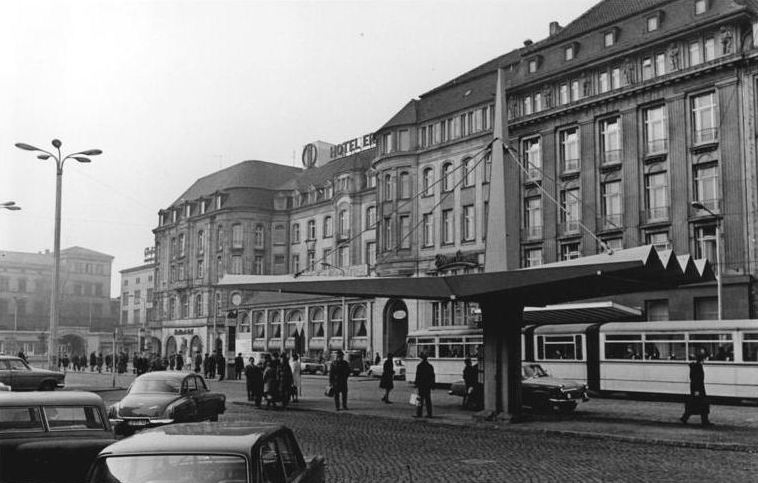
Hotel "Erfurter Hof", place of the first meeting of East and West German heads of government in 1970

After the 1848 Revolution, many Germans desired to have a united national state. An attempt in this direction was the failed Erfurt Union of German states in 1850.

The Industrial Revolution reached Erfurt in the 1840s, when the Thuringian Railway connecting Berlin and Frankfurt was built. During the following years, many factories in different sectors were founded. One of the biggest was the "Royal Gun Factory of Prussia" in 1862. After the Unification of Germany in 1871, Erfurt moved from the southern border of Prussia to the centre of Germany, so the fortifications of the city were no longer needed. The demolition of the city fortifications in 1873 led to a construction boom in Erfurt, because it was now possible to build in the area formerly occupied by the city walls and beyond. Many public and private buildings emerged and the infrastructure (such as a tramway, hospitals, and schools) improved rapidly. The number of inhabitants grew from 40,000 around 1870 to 130,000 in 1914, and the city expanded in all directions.

The "Erfurt Program" was adopted by the Social Democratic Party of Germany during its congress at Erfurt in 1891.

Between the wars, the city kept growing. Housing shortages were fought with building programmes and social infrastructure was broadened according to the welfare policy in the Weimar Republic. The Great Depression between 1929 and 1932 led to a disaster for Erfurt, nearly one out of three became unemployed. Conflicts between far-left and far-right-oriented milieus increased and many inhabitants supported the new Nazi government and Adolf Hitler. Others, especially some communist workers, put up resistance against the new administration. In 1938, the new synagogue was destroyed during the Kristallnacht. Jews lost their property and emigrated or were deported to Nazi concentration camps (together with many communists). In 1914, the company Topf and Sons began the manufacture of crematoria later becoming the market leader in this industry. Under the Nazis, JA Topf & Sons supplied specially developed crematoria, ovens and associated plants to the Auschwitz-Birkenau, Buchenwald and Mauthausen-Gusen concentration camps. On 27 January 2011 a memorial and museum dedicated to the Holocaust victims was opened at the former company premises in Erfurt.

During World War II, Erfurt experienced more than 27 British and American air raids, about 1600 civilians died. Bombed as a target of the Oil Campaign of World War II, Erfurt suffered only limited damage and was captured on 12 April 1945, by the U.S. 80th Infantry Division. On 3 July, American troops left the city, which then became part of the Soviet Zone of Occupation and eventually of the German Democratic Republic (East Germany). In 1948, Erfurt became the capital of Thuringia, replacing Weimar. In 1952, the Länder in the GDR were dissolved in favour of centralization under the new socialist government. Erfurt then became the capital of a new "Bezirk" (district). In 1953, the Hochschule of education was founded, followed by the Hochschule of medicine in 1954, the first academic institutions in Erfurt since the closing of the university in 1816.

On 19 March 1970, the East and West German heads of government Willi Stoph and Willy Brandt met in Erfurt, the first such meeting since the division of Germany. During the 1970s and 1980s, as the economic situation in GDR worsened, many old buildings in city centre decayed, while the government fought against the housing shortage by building large Plattenbau settlements in the periphery. The Peaceful Revolution of 1989/1990 led to German reunification.

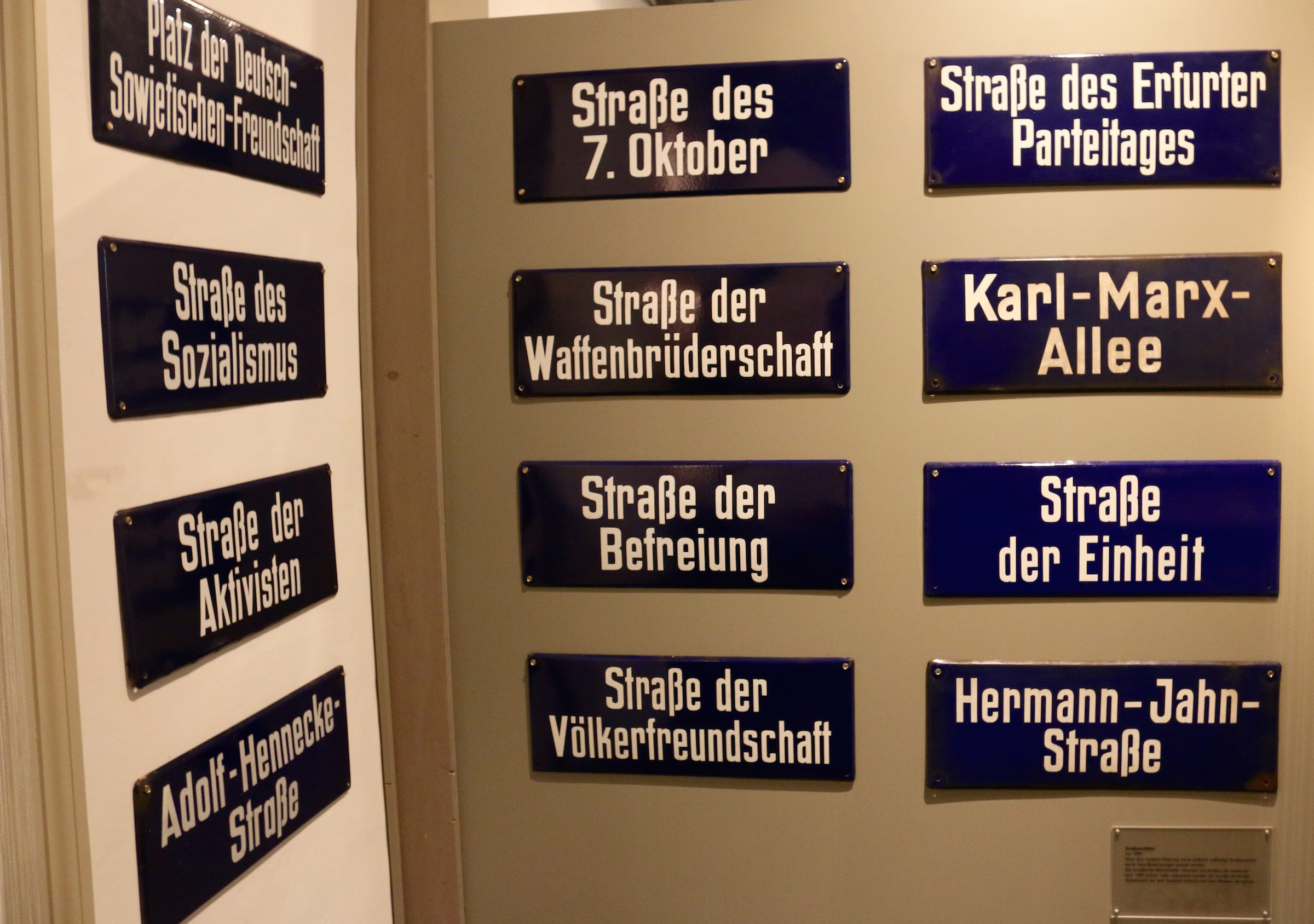
Socialist-era street signs removed from around the city of Erfurt after 1990

With the re-formation of the state of Thuringia in 1990, the city became the state capital. After reunification, a deep economic crisis occurred in Eastern Germany. Many factories closed and many people lost their jobs and moved to the former West Germany. At the same time, many buildings were redeveloped and the infrastructure improved massively. In 1994, the new university was opened, as was the Fachhochschule in 1991. Between 2005 and 2008, the economic situation improved as the unemployment rate decreased and new enterprises developed. In addition, the population began to increase once again.

A school shooting occurred on 26 April 2002 at the Gutenberg-Gymnasium.

Since the 1990s, organized crime has gained a foothold in Erfurt, with several mafia groups, including the Armenian mafia present in the city. Among other events, there has been a robbery and an arson attack targeting the gastronomy sector and in 2014 there was a shoot-out in an open street.

== Geography ==
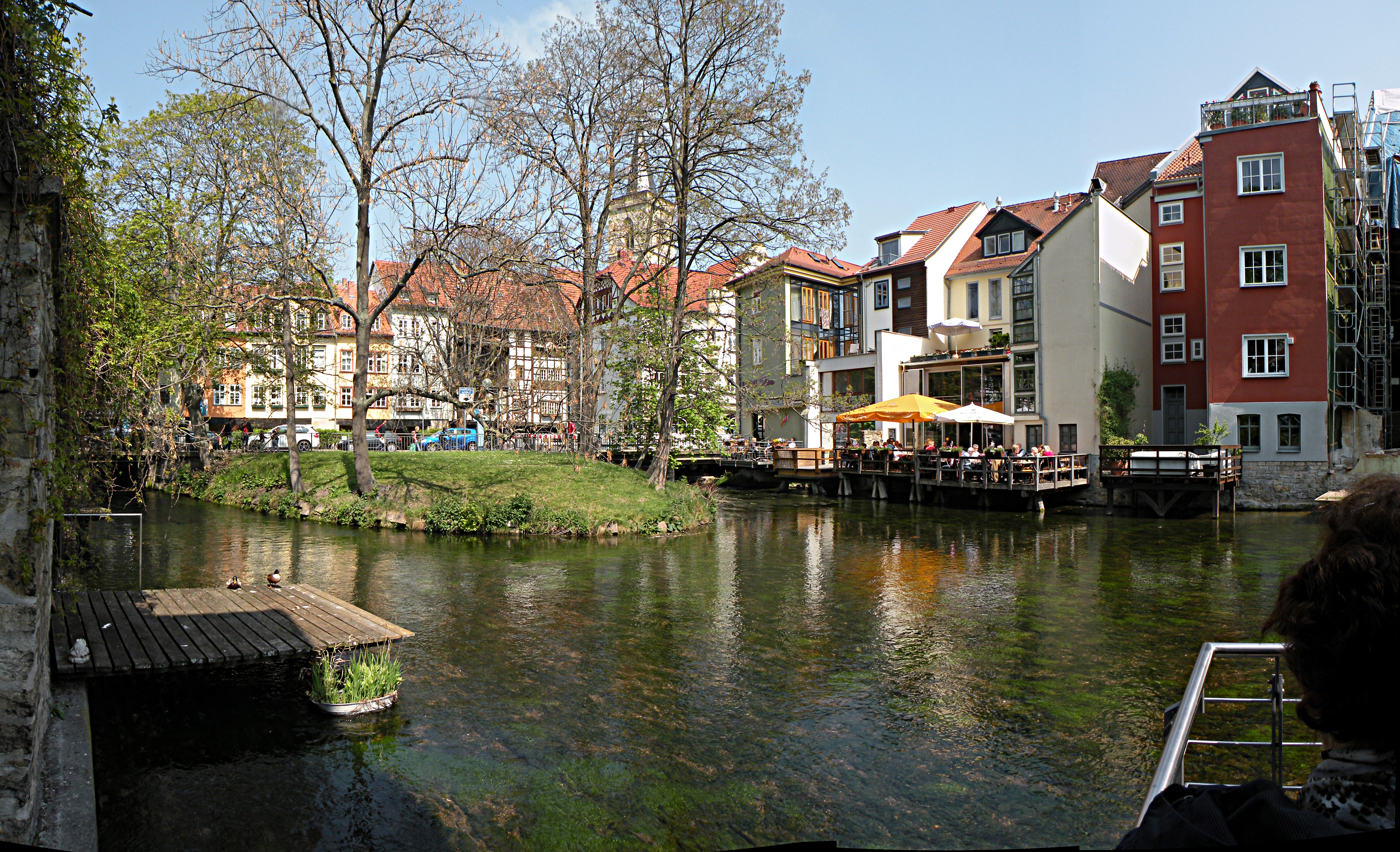
Gera river in the city centre

=== Topography ===
Erfurt is situated in the south of the Thuringian basin, a fertile agricultural area between the Harz mountains 80 km (50 mi) to the north and the Thuringian Forest 30 km (19 mi) to the southwest. Whereas the northern parts of the city area are flat, the southern ones consist of hilly landscape up to 430 m of elevation. In this part lies the municipal forest of Steigerwald with beeches and oaks as main tree species. To the east and to the west are some non-forested hills so that the Gera river valley within the town forms a basin. North of the city are some gravel pits in operation, while others are abandoned, flooded and used as leisure areas.

=== Climate ===
Erfurt has an oceanic climate (Cfb) bordering on a humid continental climate (Dfb) according to the Köppen climate classification system. Summers are warm and sometimes humid with average high temperatures of 23 °C (73 °F) and lows of 12 °C (54 °F). Winters are relatively cold with average high temperatures of 2 °C (36 °F) and lows of −3 °C (27 °F). The city's topography creates a microclimate caused by the location inside a basin with sometimes inversion in winter (quite cold nights under −20 °C (−4 °F)) and inadequate air circulation in summer. Annual precipitation is only 535 mm (21.1 in) with moderate rainfall throughout the year. Light snowfall mainly occurs from December through February, but snow cover does not usually remain for long.

The Erfurt (Erfurt–Weimar Airport) weather station has recorded the following extreme values:

- Its highest temperature was 37.9 °C (100.2 °F) on 27 June 2026.
- Its lowest temperature was −25.0 °C (−13.0 °F) on 11 January 1982.
- Its greatest annual precipitation was 766.9 mm (30.19 in) in 2002.
- Its least annual precipitation was 295.6 mm (11.64 in) in 1982.
- The longest annual sunshine was 2,039.4 hours in 2022.
- The shortest annual sunshine was 1,341 hours in 1977.

Climate data for Erfurt–Weimar Airport, 1991–2020 normals, extremes 1951–present
Month	Jan	Feb	Mar	Apr	May	Jun	Jul	Aug	Sep	Oct	Nov	Dec	Year
Record high °C (°F)	15.8 (60.4)	19.0 (66.2)	24.2 (75.6)	29.6 (85.3)	31.4 (88.5)	37.9 (100.2)	37.6 (99.7)	36.3 (97.3)	32.2 (90.0)	26.6 (79.9)	20.8 (69.4)	17.4 (63.3)	37.9 (100.2)
Mean maximum °C (°F)	10.5 (50.9)	12.3 (54.1)	17.3 (63.1)	22.6 (72.7)	26.5 (79.7)	29.8 (85.6)	31.5 (88.7)	31.5 (88.7)	26.2 (79.2)	21.2 (70.2)	14.9 (58.8)	11.4 (52.5)	33.4 (92.1)
Mean daily maximum °C (°F)	2.7 (36.9)	4.1 (39.4)	8.4 (47.1)	13.8 (56.8)	17.7 (63.9)	21.1 (70.0)	23.6 (74.5)	23.6 (74.5)	18.7 (65.7)	13.1 (55.6)	7.2 (45.0)	3.6 (38.5)	13.1 (55.6)
Daily mean °C (°F)	0.2 (32.4)	0.9 (33.6)	4.3 (39.7)	8.8 (47.8)	12.9 (55.2)	16.1 (61.0)	18.3 (64.9)	18.1 (64.6)	13.8 (56.8)	9.1 (48.4)	4.4 (39.9)	1.2 (34.2)	9.0 (48.2)
Mean daily minimum °C (°F)	−2.5 (27.5)	−2.3 (27.9)	0.3 (32.5)	3.5 (38.3)	7.4 (45.3)	10.8 (51.4)	12.8 (55.0)	12.7 (54.9)	9.1 (48.4)	5.4 (41.7)	1.6 (34.9)	−1.4 (29.5)	4.8 (40.6)
Mean minimum °C (°F)	−12.4 (9.7)	−10.7 (12.7)	−5.9 (21.4)	−3.2 (26.2)	1.0 (33.8)	5.1 (41.2)	7.8 (46.0)	6.8 (44.2)	3.1 (37.6)	−1.4 (29.5)	−5.4 (22.3)	−10.1 (13.8)	−14.8 (5.4)
Record low °C (°F)	−25.0 (−13.0)	−24.6 (−12.3)	−20.2 (−4.4)	−10.4 (13.3)	−2.9 (26.8)	0.0 (32.0)	3.3 (37.9)	3.7 (38.7)	−0.6 (30.9)	−7.6 (18.3)	−18.6 (−1.5)	−23.5 (−10.3)	−25.0 (−13.0)
Average precipitation mm (inches)	25.0 (0.98)	22.9 (0.90)	36.3 (1.43)	34.2 (1.35)	63.9 (2.52)	55.7 (2.19)	80.8 (3.18)	58.7 (2.31)	45.8 (1.80)	37.6 (1.48)	41.1 (1.62)	32.6 (1.28)	534.7 (21.05)
Average extreme snow depth cm (inches)	7.4 (2.9)	6.6 (2.6)	4.3 (1.7)	0.8 (0.3)	0 (0)	0 (0)	0 (0)	0 (0)	0 (0)	0.4 (0.2)	1.7 (0.7)	6.7 (2.6)	13.1 (5.2)
Average precipitation days (≥ 0.1 mm)	15.0	13.1	14.8	11.8	13.8	13.2	14.9	13.0	12.0	13.9	14.3	15.3	165.0
Average snowy days (≥ 1.0 cm)	11.7	9.5	4.3	0.3	0	0	0	0	0	0.2	2.0	7.3	35.4
Average relative humidity (%)	85.7	82.4	77.7	70.7	72.1	72.4	70.1	69.2	76.2	82.8	87.0	87.2	77.8
Mean monthly sunshine hours	59.7	80.6	128.7	184.8	211.9	219.8	224.7	210.4	159.3	112.4	60.7	47.0	1,706.5
Source 1: NOAA
Source 2: Deutscher Wetterdienst / SKlima.de

=== Administrative divisions ===
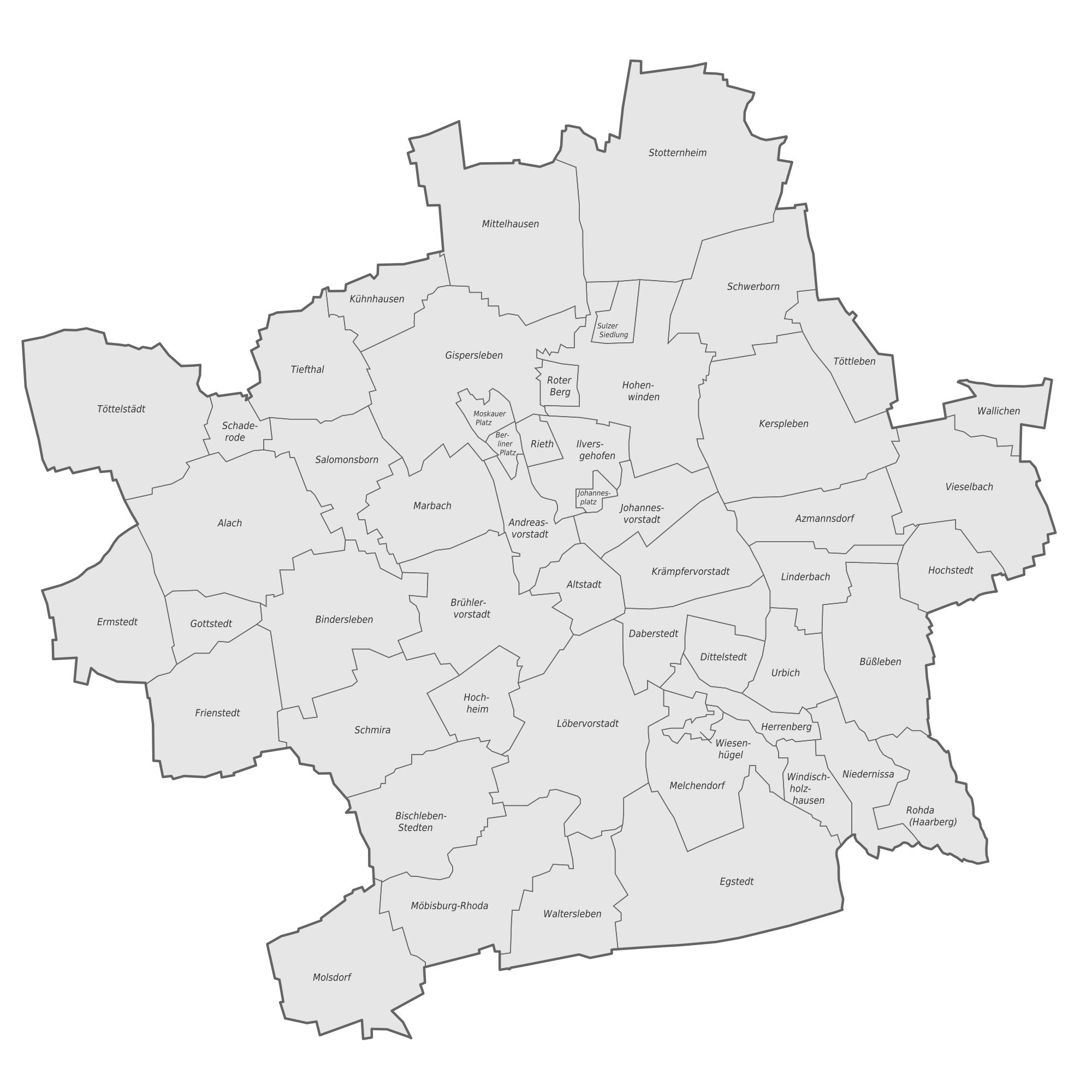
Districts of Erfurt

Erfurt abuts the districts of Sömmerda (municipalities Witterda, Elxleben, Walschleben, Riethnordhausen, Nöda, Alperstedt, Großrudestedt, Udestedt, Kleinmölsen and Großmölsen) in the north, Weimarer Land (municipalities Niederzimmern, Nohra, Mönchenholzhausen and Klettbach) in the east, Ilm-Kreis (municipalities Kirchheim, Rockhausen and Amt Wachsenburg) in the south and Gotha (municipalities Nesse-Apfelstädt, Nottleben, Zimmernsupra and Bienstädt) in the west.

The city itself is divided into 53 districts. The centre is formed by the district Altstadt (old town) and the Gründerzeit districts Andreasvorstadt in the northwest, Johannesvorstadt in the northeast, Krämpfervorstadt in the east, Daberstedt in the southeast, Löbervorstadt in the southwest and Brühlervorstadt in the west. More former industrial districts are Ilversgehofen (incorporated in 1911), Hohenwinden and Sulzer Siedlung in the north. Another group of districts is marked by Plattenbau settlements, constructed during the East Germany period: Berliner Platz, Moskauer Platz, Rieth, Roter Berg and Johannesplatz in the northern as well as Melchendorf, Wiesenhügel and Herrenberg in the southern city parts.

Eventually, there are many villages with an average population of approximately 1,000 which were incorporated during the 20th century; they have mostly retained a rural character to date, however:

- Alach (incorporated 1994)
- Azmannsdorf (1994)
- Bindersleben (1950)
- Bischleben-Stedten (1950)
- Büßleben (1994)
- Dittelstedt (1994)
- Egstedt (1994)
- Ermstedt (1994)
- Frienstedt (1994)
- Gispersleben (1950)
- Gottstedt (1994)
- Hochheim (1938)
- Hochstedt (1994)
- Kerspleben (1994)
- Kühnhausen (1994)
- Linderbach (1994)
- Marbach (1950)
- Mittelhausen (1994)
- Möbisburg-Rhoda (1950)
- Molsdorf (1994)
- Niedernissa (1994)
- Rohda (1994)
- Salomonsborn (1994)
- Schaderode (1994)
- Schmira (1950)
- Schwerborn (1994)
- Stotternheim (1994)
- Tiefthal (1994)
- Töttelstädt (1994)
- Töttleben (1994)
- Urbich (1994)
- Vieselbach (1994)
- Wallichen (1994)
- Waltersleben (1994)
- Windischholzhausen (1994)

==== Erfurt-Southeast ====
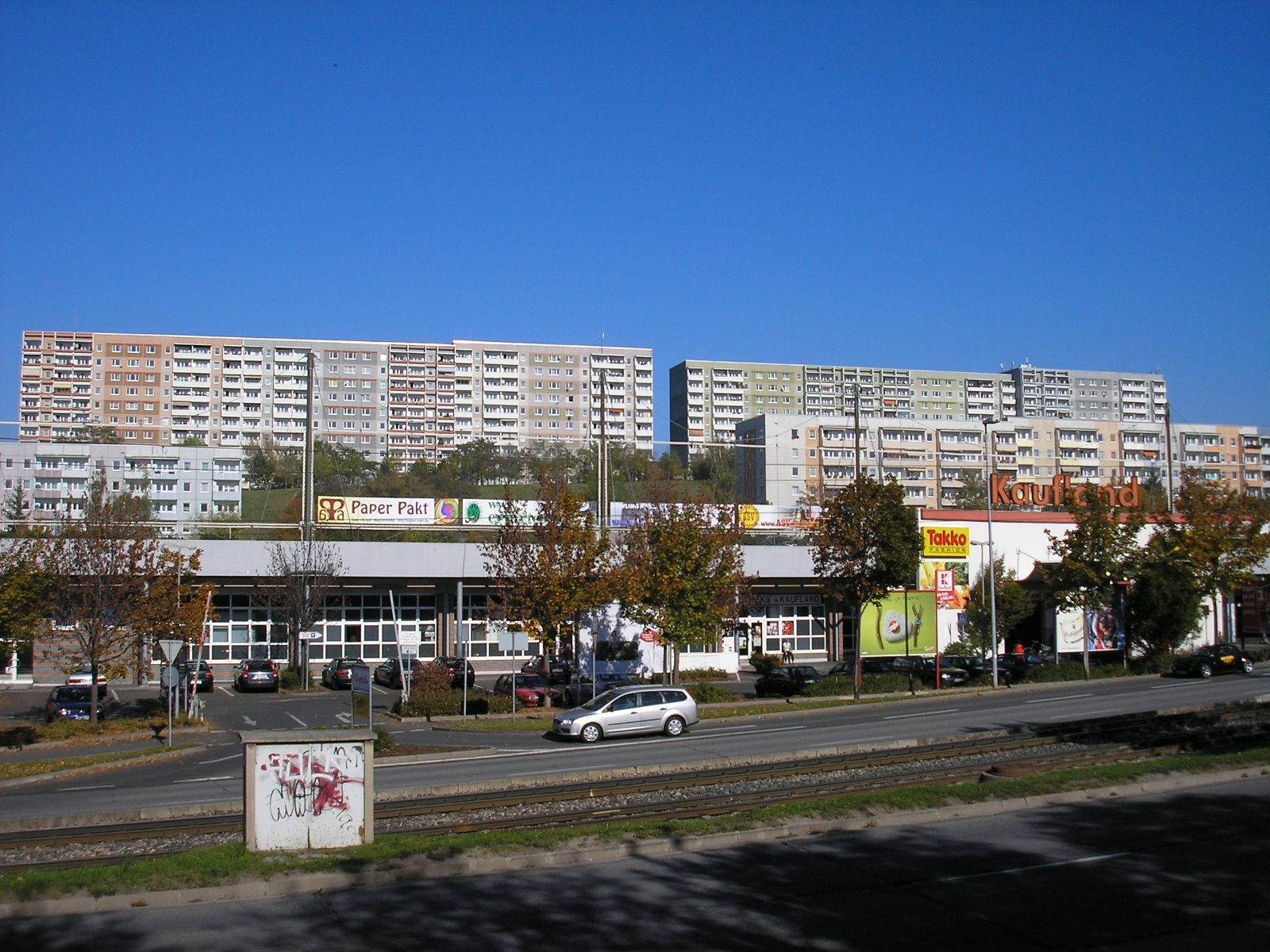
Herrenberg Street in Erfurt-Southeast

Erfurt-Southeast (German: Erfurt-Südost) is the collective name for a series of prefabricated housing areas that emerged in the southeast of Erfurt in the last ten years of East Germany. After Erfurt-Nord, Erfurt-Südost is the second-largest prefabricated building area in the city. The problems associated with large housing estates are not as pronounced in the southeast as in the north, but they are still present.

The districts of Melchendorf, Herrenberg and Wiesenhügel belong to Erfurt-Südost, all of which were formed from the former local area of Melchendorf. The village of Melchendorf with around 1,000 inhabitants lies between the prefabricated building areas. In addition to the old village, the district of Melchendorf also includes the prefab housing areas of Drosselberg and Buchenberg as well as several four-story apartment blocks from the 1950s and 1960s on Kranichfelder Straße. Around 24,000 people still live in the large settlement, which was once designed for almost 40,000 inhabitants.

== Population ==
History of the population from 1493 to 2014

Historical population
Year	Pop.	±%
1493	18,680	—
1620	19,000	+1.7%
1632	13,000	−31.6%
1710	14,338	+10.3%
1802	16,938	+18.1%
1817	14,846	−12.4%
1871	43,616	+193.8%
1900	85,202	+95.3%
1910	111,463	+30.8%
1925	136,555	+22.5%
1933	146,270	+7.1%
1939	165,615	+13.2%
1951	190,487	+15.0%
1961	186,369	−2.2%
1971	198,265	+6.4%
1976	205,483	+3.6%
1981	212,012	+3.2%
1986	217,134	+2.4%
1991	204,912	−5.6%
1996	208,179	+1.6%
2001	200,126	−3.9%
2011	200,868	+0.4%
2022	218,200	+8.6%
Population size may be affected by changes in administrative divisions.

The largest groups of foreign residents, 2022
Nationality	Population
Ukraine	3,596
Syria	2,315
Poland	2,025
Hungary	1,435
Vietnam	1,252
Italy	1,143
Romania	1,014
Afghanistan	955
Bulgaria	943
Serbia	737

Around the year 1500, the city had 18,000 inhabitants and was one of the largest cities in the Holy Roman Empire. The population then more or less stagnated until the 19th century. The population of Erfurt was 21,000 in 1820, and increased to 32,000 in 1847, the year of rail connection as industrialization began. In the following decades Erfurt grew up to 130,000 at the beginning of World War I and 190,000 inhabitants in 1950. A maximum was reached in 1988 with 220,000 persons. In 1991, after the German reunification and when Erfurt became the capital of Thuringia state, it had a population of about 205,000. The bad economic situation in eastern Germany after the reunification resulted in a decline in population, which fell to 200,000 in 2002 before rising again to 206,000 in 2011. The average growth of population between 2009 and 2012 was approximately 0.68% p. a., whereas the population in bordering rural regions is shrinking with accelerating tendency. Suburbanization played only a small role in Erfurt. It occurred after reunification for a short time in the 1990s, but most of the suburban areas were situated within the administrative city borders. Erfurt is also the 34th-largest city in Germany by overall (and 10th-largest among major cities with a population of 100,000 or more) by area, with area of 269.91 km^{2} (104.21 sq mi).

The birth deficit was 200 in 2012, this is −1.0 per 1,000 inhabitants (Thuringian average: −4.5; national average: −2.4). The net migration rate was +8.3 per 1,000 inhabitants in 2012 (Thuringian average: −0.8; national average: +4.6). The most important regions of origin of Erfurt migrants are rural areas of Thuringia, Saxony-Anhalt and Saxony as well as foreign countries like Poland, Russia, Syria, Afghanistan and Hungary. Erfurt is today one of the popular cities in former East Germany due to its universities and broadcasting companies.

Like other cities within the area of former East Germany, foreigners account only for a small share of Erfurt's population: c. 3.0 % are non-Germans by citizenship and overall 5.9% are migrants (according to the 2011 European Union census).

Due to the official atheism of the former communist East German regime, most of the population is non-religious. 14.8% are members of the Evangelical Church in Central Germany and 6.8% are Catholics (according to the 2011 EU census). The Jewish community consists of 500 members. Most of them migrated to Erfurt from Russia and Ukraine in the 1990s.

== Culture, sights and cityscape ==
=== Residents notable in cultural history ===
The theologian, philosopher and mystic Meister Eckhart (c. 1260–1328) entered the Dominican monastery (Predigerkloster) in Erfurt when he was aged about 18 (around 1275). Eckhart was the Dominican prior at Erfurt from 1294 until 1298, and Vicar of Thuringia from 1298 to 1302. After a year in Paris, he returned to Erfurt in 1303 and administered his duties as Provincial of Saxony from there until 1311.

Martin Luther (1483–1546) studied law and philosophy at the University of Erfurt from 1501. He lived in St Augustine's Monastery in Erfurt, as a friar from 1505 to 1511.

Johann Pachelbel (1653–1706) served as organist at the Predigerkirche (Preachers Church) in Erfurt from June 1678 until August 1690. Pachelbel composed approximately seventy pieces for organ while in Erfurt.

The city is the birthplace of one of Johann Sebastian Bach's cousins, Johann Bernhard Bach, as well as Johann Sebastian Bach's father Johann Ambrosius Bach. Bach's parents were married in 1668 in the Kaufmannskirche (Merchant's Church) that still exists on the main square of Anger.

Max Weber (1864–1920) was born in Erfurt. He was a sociologist, philosopher, lawyer, and political economist whose ideas have profoundly influenced modern social theory and social research.

After 1906 the composer Richard Wetz (1875–1935) lived in Erfurt and became the leading person in the city's musical life. His major works were written here, including three symphonies, a Requiem and a Christmas Oratorio.

The textile designer Margaretha Reichardt (1907–1984) was born and died in Erfurt. She studied at the Bauhaus from 1926 to 1930, and while there worked with Marcel Breuer on his innovative chair designs. Her former home and weaving workshop in Erfurt, the Margaretha Reichardt Haus, is now a museum, managed by the Angermuseum Erfurt.

Famous contemporary musicians from Erfurt are Clueso, the Boogie Pimps and Yvonne Catterfeld.

=== Museums ===
- The Stadtmuseum (municipal museum) shows aspects of Erfurt's history with a focus on the Middle Ages, early modern history, Martin Luther and the university. Other parts of the Stadtmuseum are the Neue Mühle (new mill), an old water mill still in operation, and the Benaryspeicher (Benary's magazine) with an exhibition of old printing machines.
- The Alte Synagoge (Old Synagogue) is one of the oldest synagogue buildings in Europe. It is now a museum of local Jewish history, showing facsimiles of medieval Hebrew manuscripts and the Erfurt Treasure, a hoard of coins and goldsmiths' work that is assumed to have belonged to Jews who hid them in 1349 at the time of the Black Death pogroms.
- The Erinnerungsort Topf & Söhne (Topf and Sons Memorial) is on the site of the factory of the company which designed crematoria for Auschwitz and other concentration camps. Its exhibitions outline the collaboration of a civilian company with the fascist regime of National Socialism in the Holocaust.
- Memorial and Education Centre Andreasstrasse ("Stasi Museum"). On the site of the former Erfurt Stasi prison, where over 5000 people were held. On 4 December 1989, the building was occupied by local residents. It was the first of many such takeovers of Stasi buildings in then East Germany. Today it has exhibitions on the history of East Germany and the activities of its regime.
- The Angermuseum is one of the main art museums of Erfurt, named after Anger Square, where it is located. It focuses on modern graphic arts, medieval sculpture and early modern artisanal handicraft.
- The Kunsthalle Erfurt (Erfurt City Art Gallery) has exhibitions of contemporary art, of local, national and international artists.
- The Margaretha Reichardt Haus is the home and workshop of the textile designer and former Bauhaus student, Margaretha Reichardt (1907–1984).
- The Peterskirche (St Peter's Church) houses an exhibition of concrete art, i. e. totally abstract art (not art made out of concrete).
- The Deutsches Gartenbaumuseum (Museum of German Horticulture) is housed at the Cyriaksburg Citadel.
- The Naturkundemuseum (Museum of Natural History) is situated in a medieval woad warehouse and explores Thuringian flora and fauna, geology and ecology.
- The Museum für Thüringer Volkskunde (Museum of Folk Art and Cultural Anthropology) illustrates the ordinary life of people in Thuringia in the past and shows exhibits of peasant and artisan traditions.
- The Elektromuseum (Museum of Electrical Engineering) shows the history of electric engines, which have featured prominently in Erfurt's economy.
- Schloss Molsdorf in the district of Molsdorf is a Baroque palace housing an exhibition about the painter Otto Knöpfer.

=== Image gallery ===
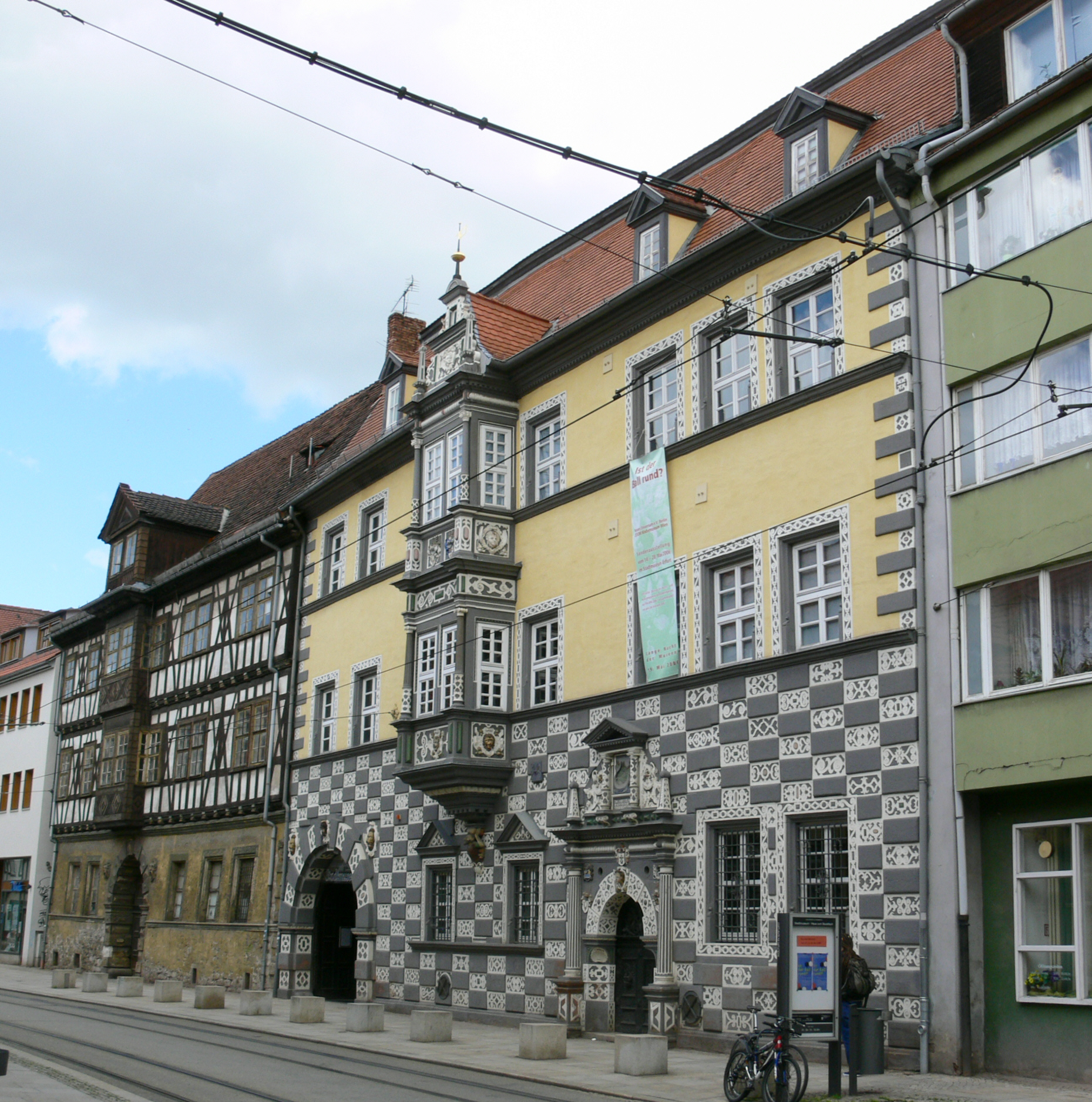
Stadtmuseum

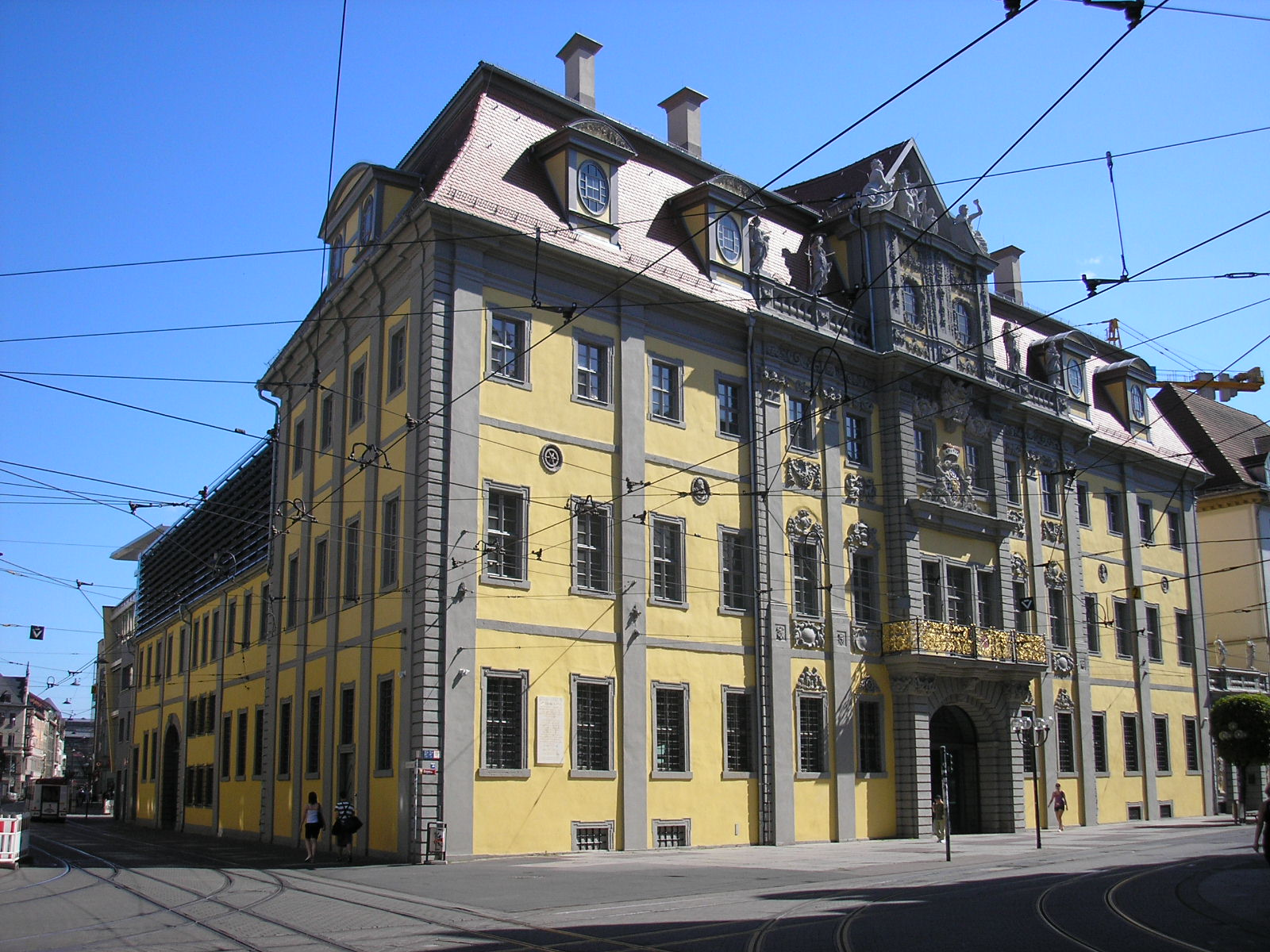
Angermuseum

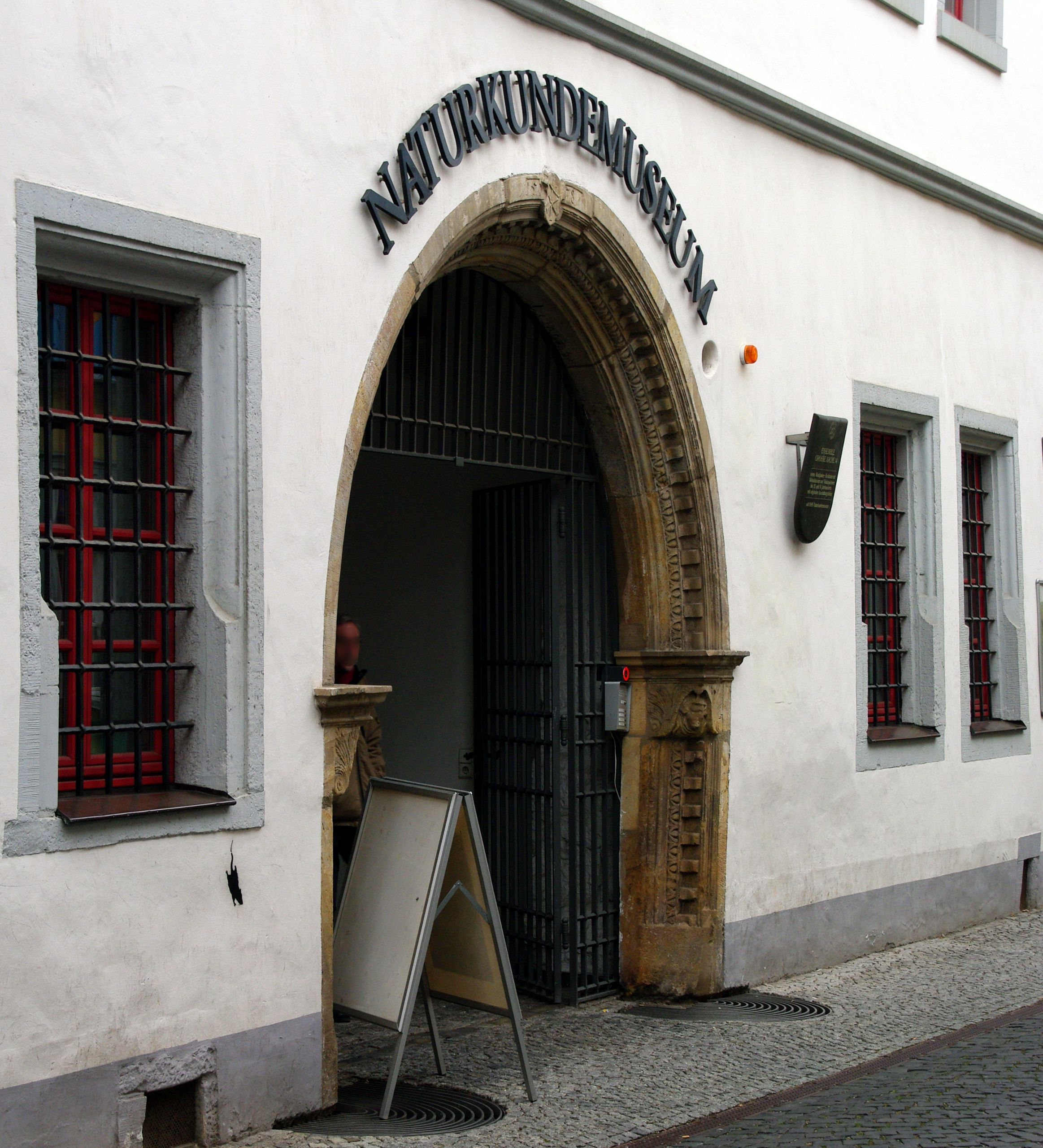
Naturkundemuseum

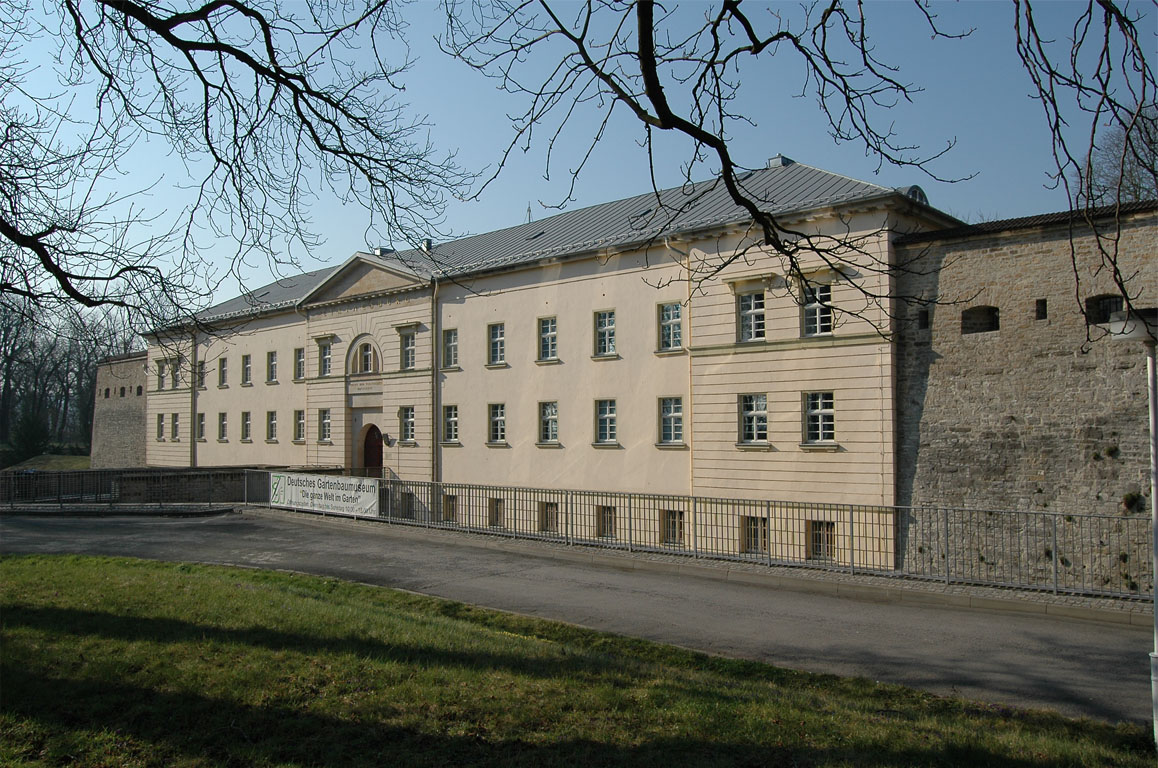
Deutsches Gartenbaumuseum

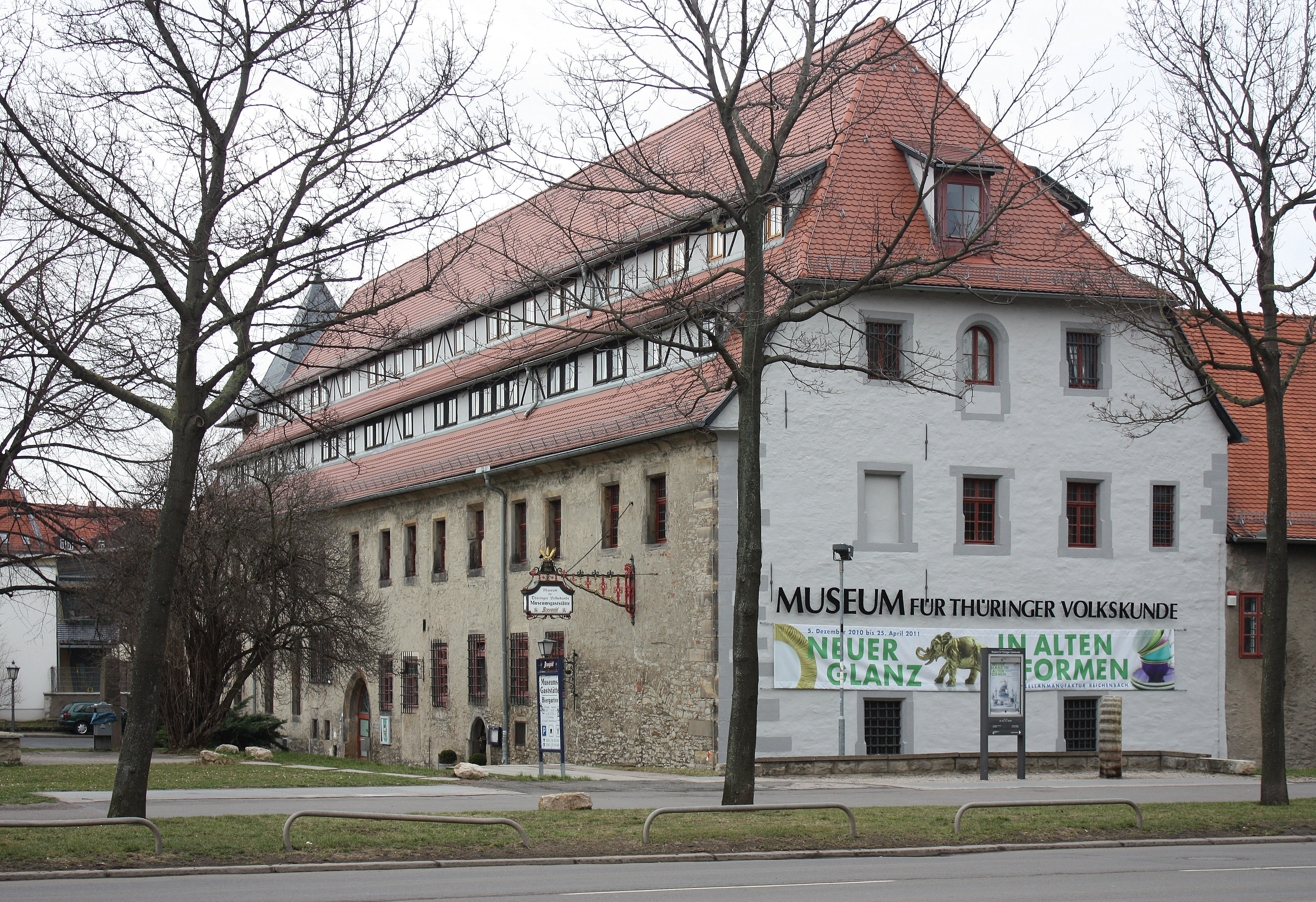
Museum für Thüringer Volkskunde

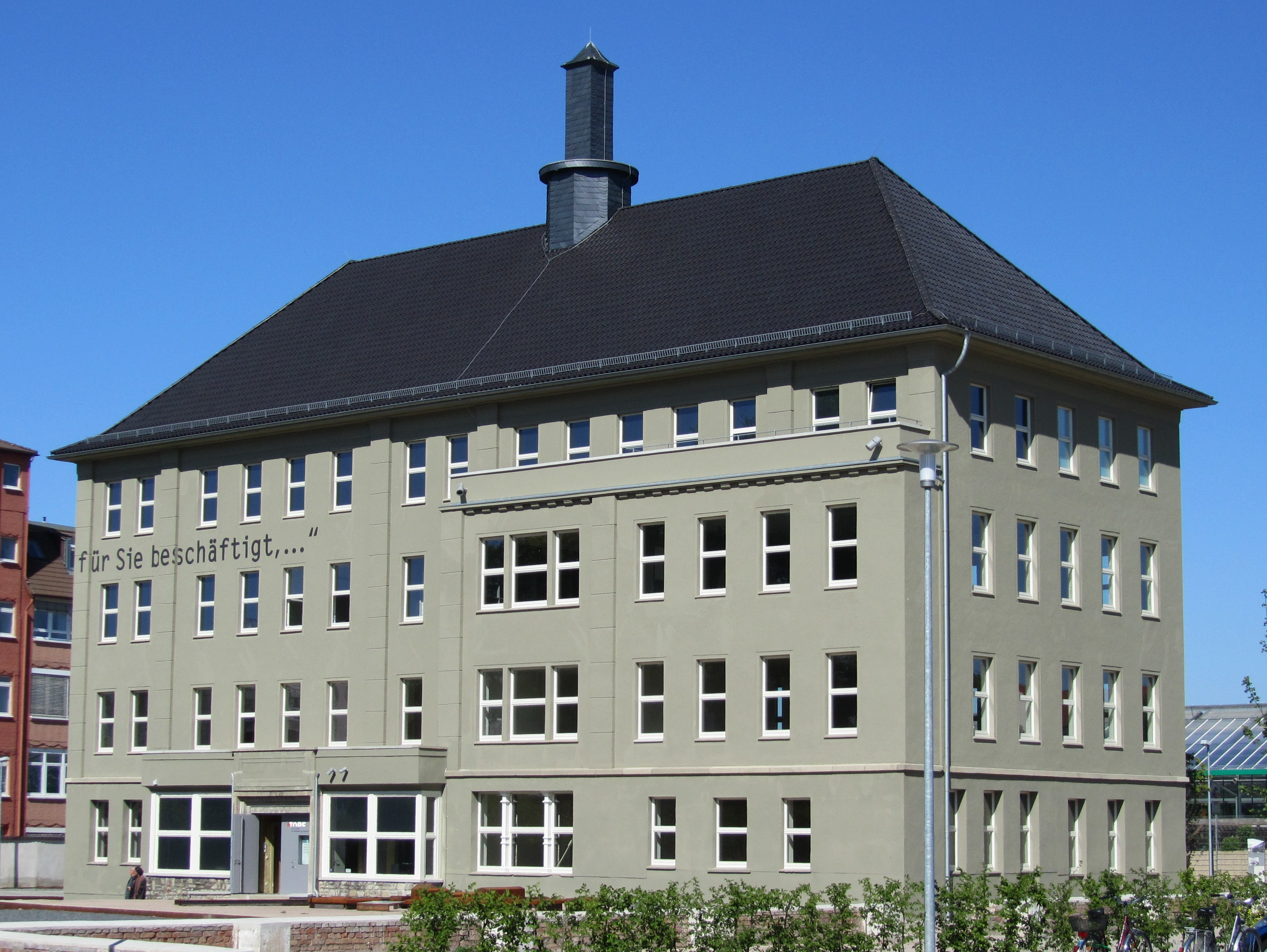
J.A. Topf & Söhne museum and holocaust memorial site

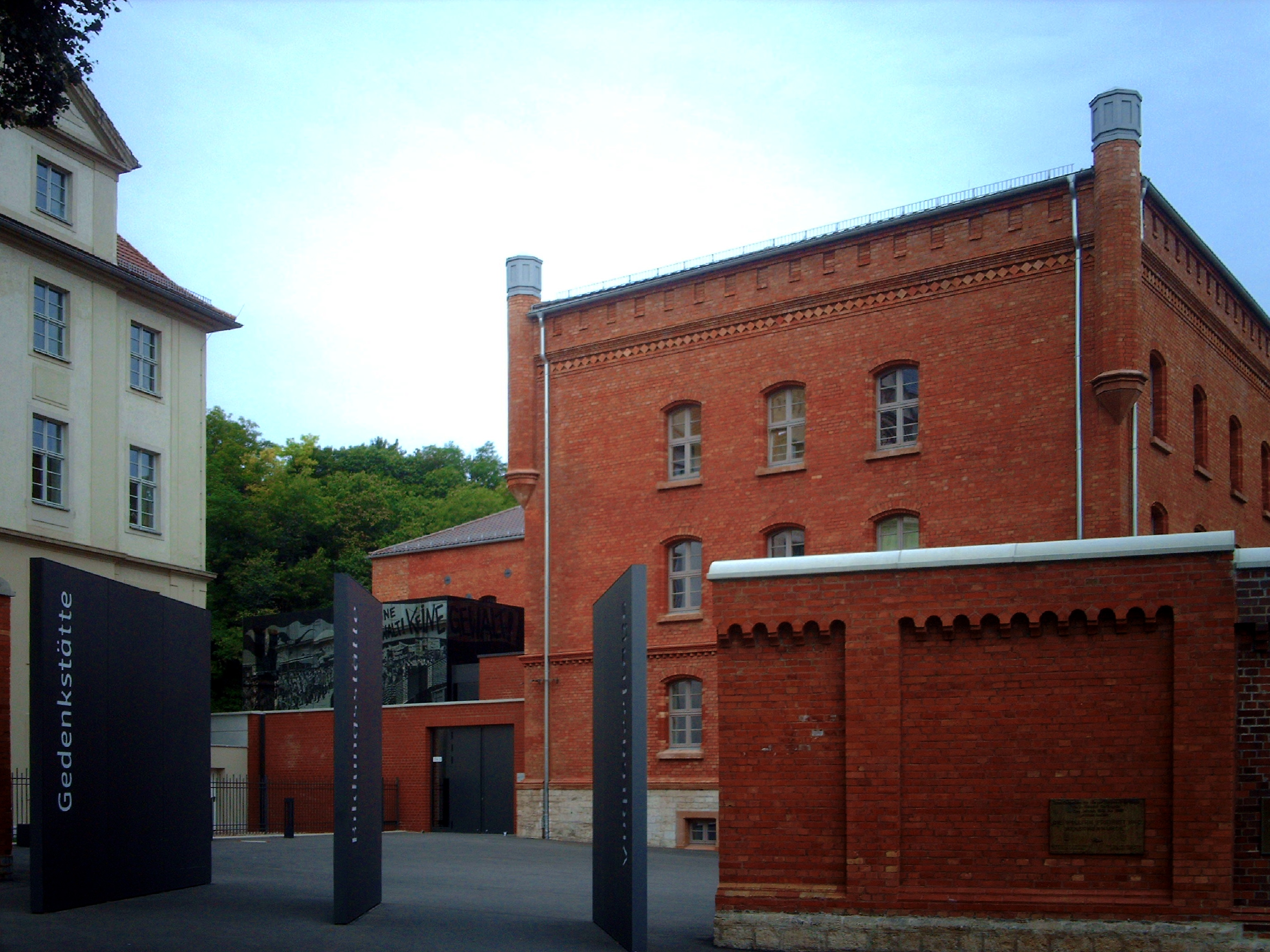
Memorial and Education Centre Andreasstrasse, former Stasi prison

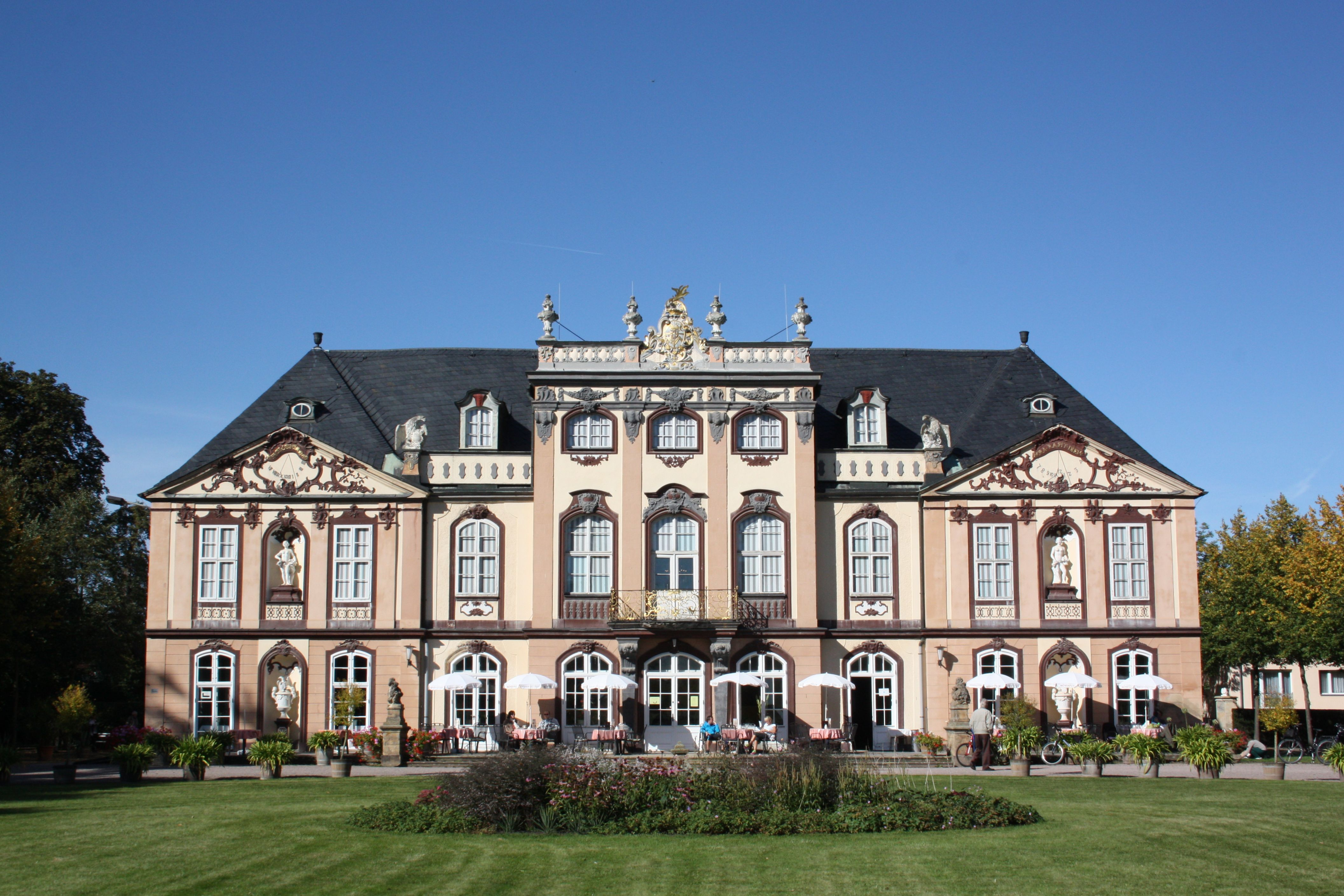
Schloss Molsdorf

=== Theatre ===
Since 2003, the modern opera house is home to Theater Erfurt and its Philharmonic Orchestra. The "grand stage" section has 800 seats and the "studio stage" can hold 200 spectators. In September 2005, the opera Waiting for the Barbarians by Philip Glass premiered in the opera house. The Erfurt Theatre has been a source of controversy. In 2005, a performance of Engelbert Humperdinck's opera Hänsel und Gretel stirred up the local press since the performance contained suggestions of pedophilia and incest. The opera was advertised in the programme with the addition "for adults only".

On 12 April 2008, a version of Verdi's opera Un ballo in maschera directed by Johann Kresnik opened at the Erfurt Theatre. The production stirred deep controversy by featuring nude performers in Mickey Mouse masks dancing on the ruins of the World Trade Center and a female singer with a painted on Hitler toothbrush moustache performing a straight arm Nazi salute, along with sinister portrayals of American soldiers, Uncle Sam, and Elvis Presley impersonators. The director described the production as a populist critique of modern American society, aimed at showing up the disparities between rich and poor. The controversy prompted one local politician to call for locals to boycott the performances, but this was largely ignored and the première was sold out.

=== Sport ===
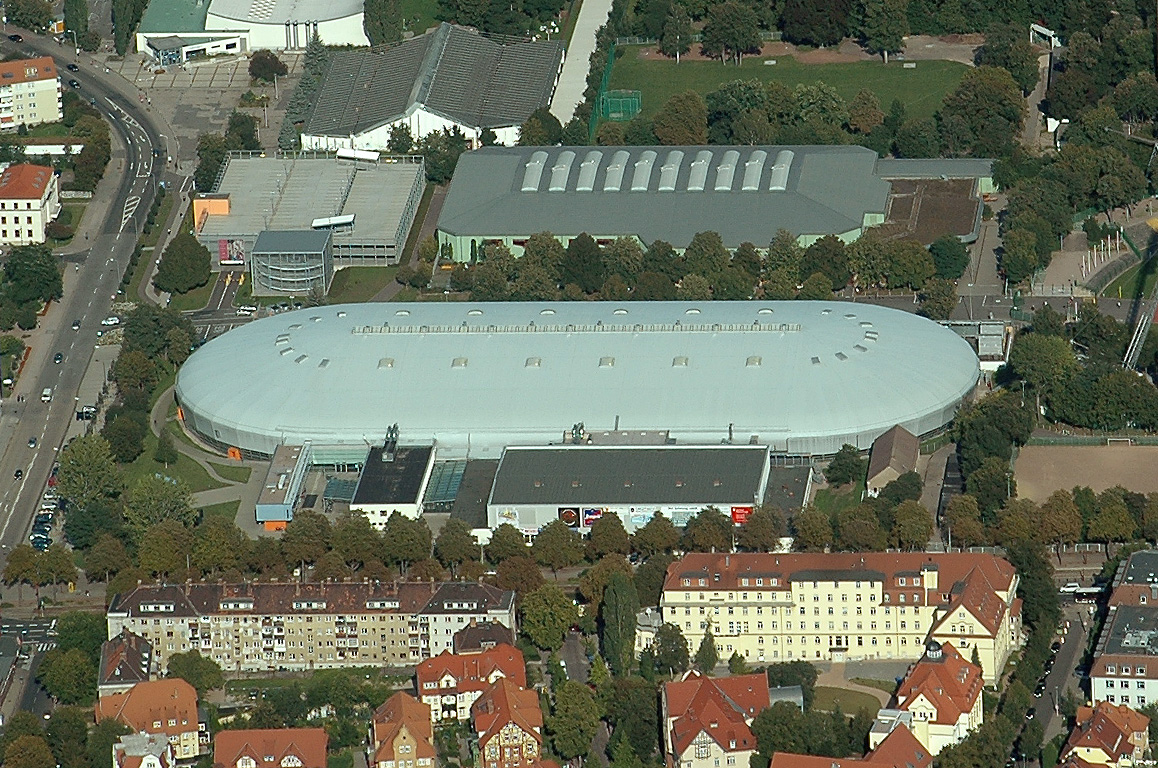
Gunda-Niemann-Stirnemann Halle

Notable types of sport in Erfurt are athletics, ice skating, cycling (with the oldest velodrome in use in the world, opened in 1885), swimming, handball, volleyball, tennis and football. The city's football club FC Rot-Weiß Erfurt is a member of the Regionalliga Nordost and is based in the Steigerwaldstadion. The Gunda-Niemann-Stirnemann Halle was the second indoor speed skating arena in Germany. It hosted the 2002 edition of the European Speed Skating Championships (German: Eisschnelllauf-Mehrkampfeuropameisterschaft).

=== Cityscape ===
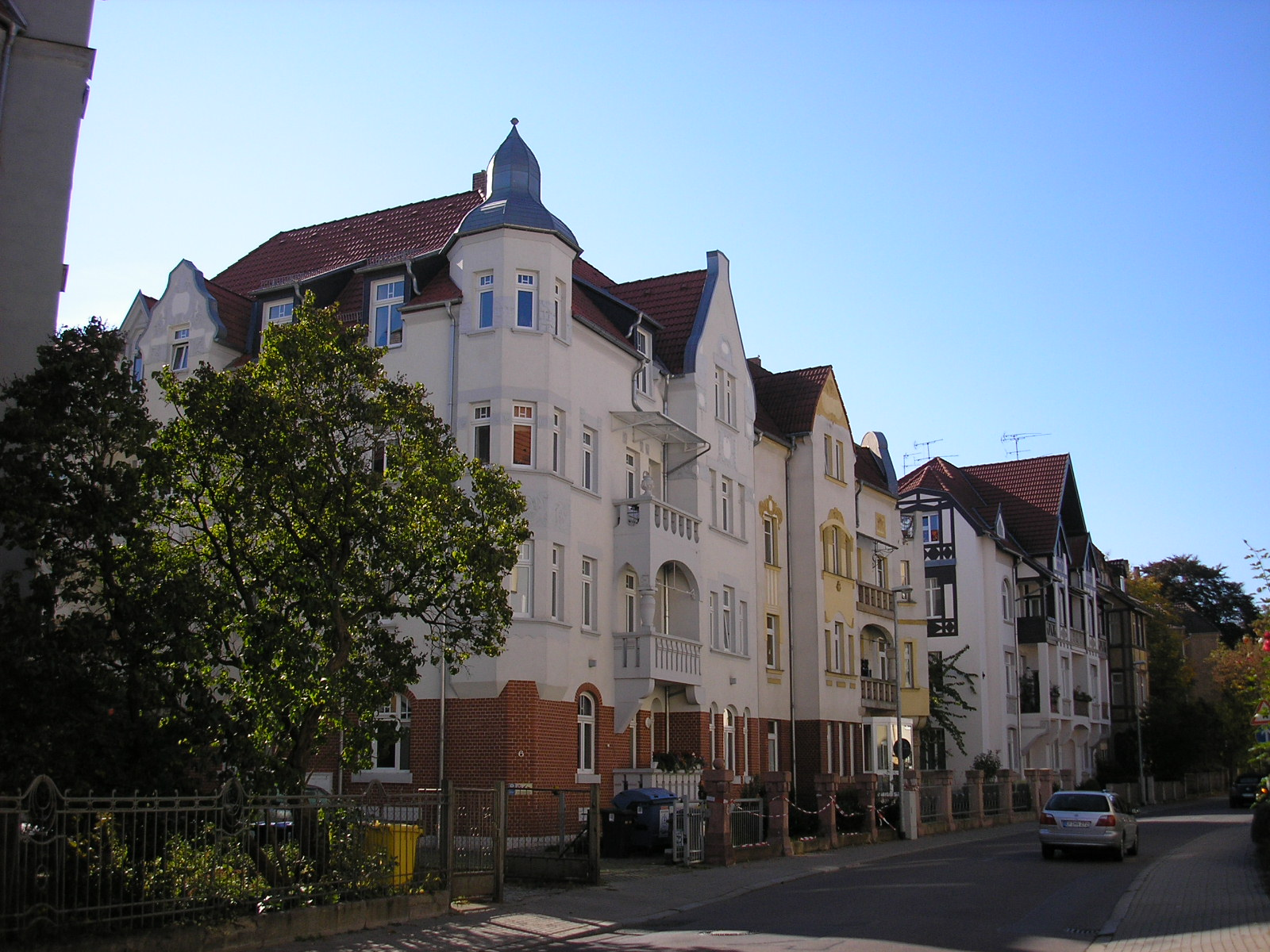
Architecture from the Gründerzeit in Brühlervorstadt district

Erfurt's cityscape features a medieval core of narrow, curved alleys in the centre surrounded by a belt of Gründerzeit architecture, created between 1873 and 1914. In 1873, the city's fortifications were demolished and it became possible to build houses in the area in front of the former city walls. In the following years, Erfurt saw a construction boom. In the northern area (districts Andreasvorstadt, Johannesvorstadt and Ilversgehofen) tenements for the factory workers were built whilst the eastern area (Krämpfervorstadt and Daberstedt) featured apartments for white-collar workers and clerks and the southwestern part (Löbervorstadt and Brühlervorstadt) with its beautiful valley landscape saw the construction of villas and mansions of rich factory owners and notables.

During the interwar period, some settlements in Bauhaus style were realized, often as housing cooperatives.

After World War II and over the whole GDR period, housing shortages remained a problem even though the government started a big apartment construction programme. Between 1970 and 1990 large Plattenbau settlements with high-rise blocks on the northern (for 50,000 inhabitants) and southeastern (for 40,000 inhabitants) periphery were constructed. After reunification the renovation of old houses in city centre and the Gründerzeit areas was a big issue. The federal government granted substantial subsidies, so that many houses could be restored.

Compared to many other German cities, little of Erfurt was destroyed in World War II. This is one reason why the centre today offers a mixture of medieval, Baroque and Neoclassical architecture as well as buildings from the last 150 years.

Public green spaces are located along Gera river and in several parks like the Stadtpark, the Nordpark and the Südpark. The largest green area is the Egapark, a horticultural exhibition park and botanic garden established in 1961.

=== Sights and architectural heritage ===
==== Churches, monasteries and synagogues ====
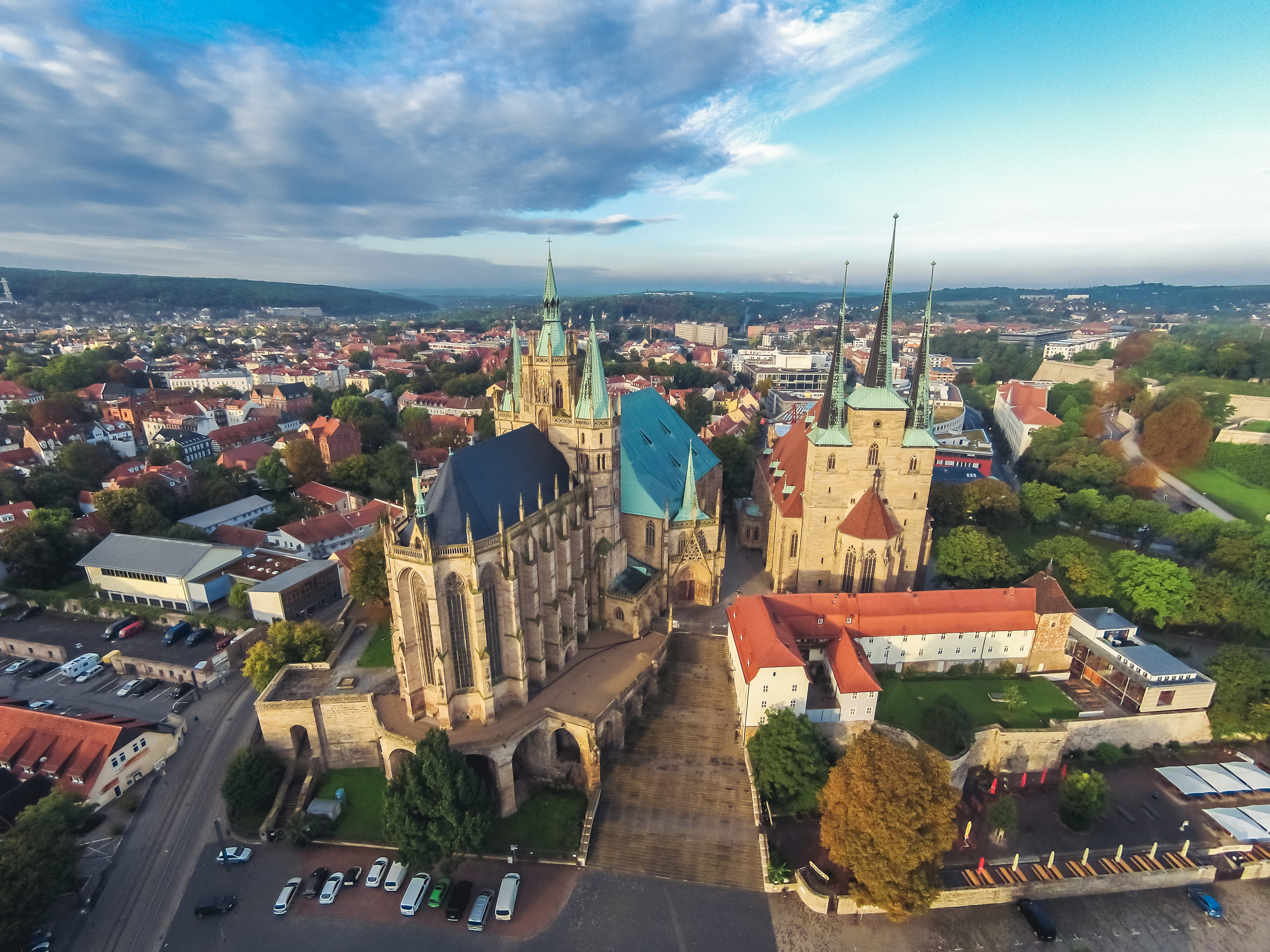
St Mary's Cathedral (left) and St Severus' Church (right) on Domberg hill

The city centre has about 25 churches and monasteries, most of them in Gothic style, some also in Romanesque style or a mixture of Romanesque and Gothic elements, and a few in later styles. The various steeples characterize the medieval centre and led to one of Erfurt's nicknames as the "Thuringian Rome".

===== Catholic churches and monasteries =====
- The Allerheiligenkirche (All Saints' Church) is a 14th-century Gothic church in Marktstraße (Market Street), which hosts a columbarium.
- The Dom St. Marien (St Mary's Cathedral) perches above Domplatz, the Cathedral Square. It is the episcopal see and one of the main sights of Erfurt. It combines Romanesque and Gothic elements and has the largest free-swinging medieval bell in the world, which is named Gloriosa. One of the works of art inside the cathedral is Lucas Cranach the Elder's 'The Mystic Marriage of St. Catherine' painted around 1520.
- The Lorenzkirche (St Lawrence's Church) is a small 14th-century Gothic parish church at Anger Square.
- The Martinikirche (St Martin's Church) was built in the 15th century in Gothic style and in 1755–58 converted to Baroque style. It was both a Cistercian nunnery and a parish church of Brühl, a medieval suburban zone.
- The Neuwerkskirche St. Crucis ("church of the new facility", Holy Cross Church) is a 15th-century Gothic church at Neuwerkstraße, that was later converted to Baroque style. Until the 13th century, it was used by a convent of Augustinian nuns.
- The Schottenkirche St. Nikolai und St. Jakobi (Scots Monks' Church of St Nicholas and St James) is an 11th-century Romanesque monastery church with a Baroque façade, which was later used as a parish church.
- The Severikirche (St Severus' Church) is the second-largest parish church after the cathedral and stands next to it on the Domberg hill. It is in Gothic style and was built around 1300.
- The Ursulinenkirche, St Ursula's Church, is a Gothic church at Anger Square. It is attached to the Ursulinenkloster, St Ursula's Nunnery, founded in 1136.
- The Wigbertikirche (St Wigbert's Church) is a 15th-century Gothic church near Anger Square.
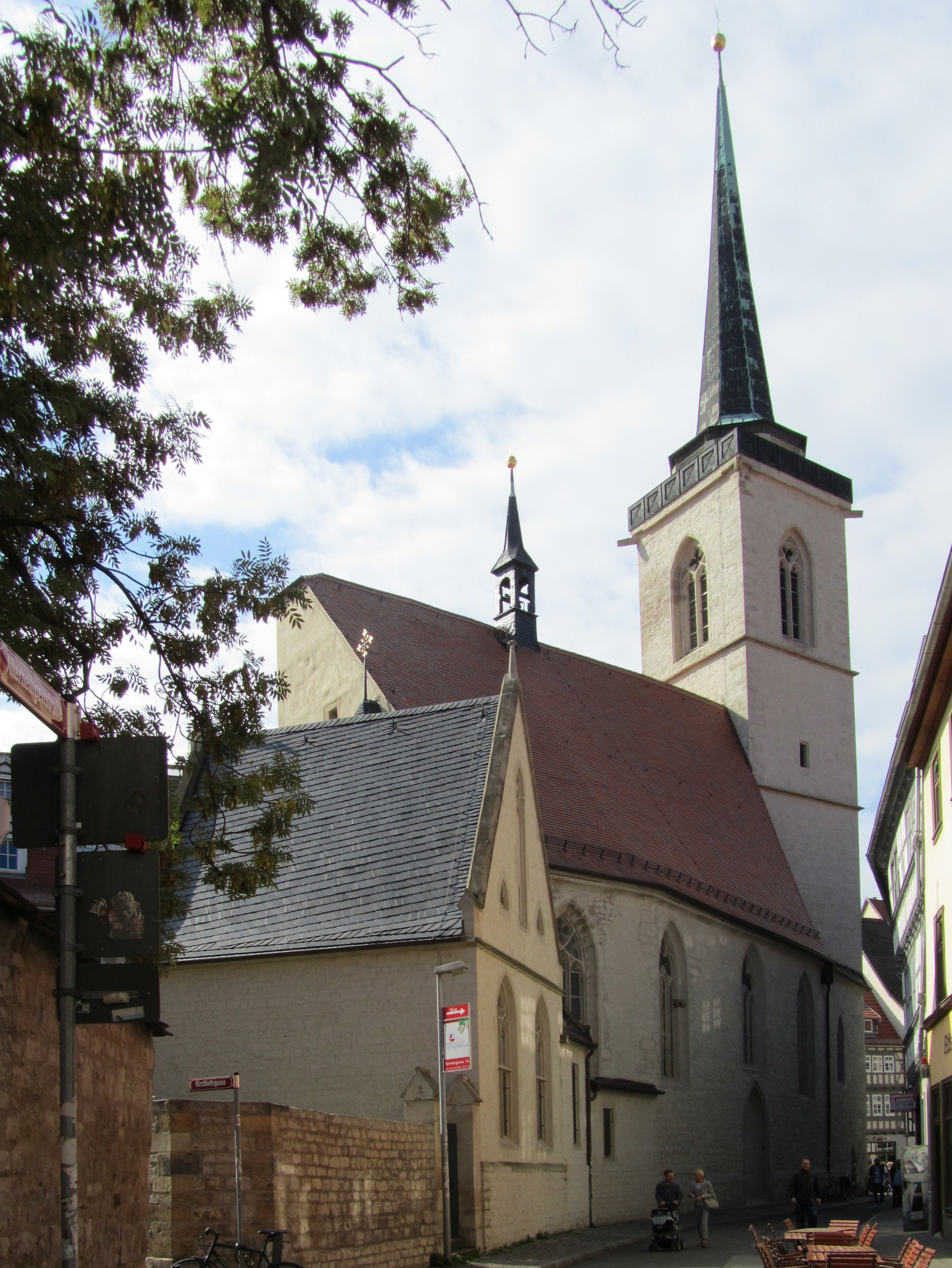
All Saints' Church

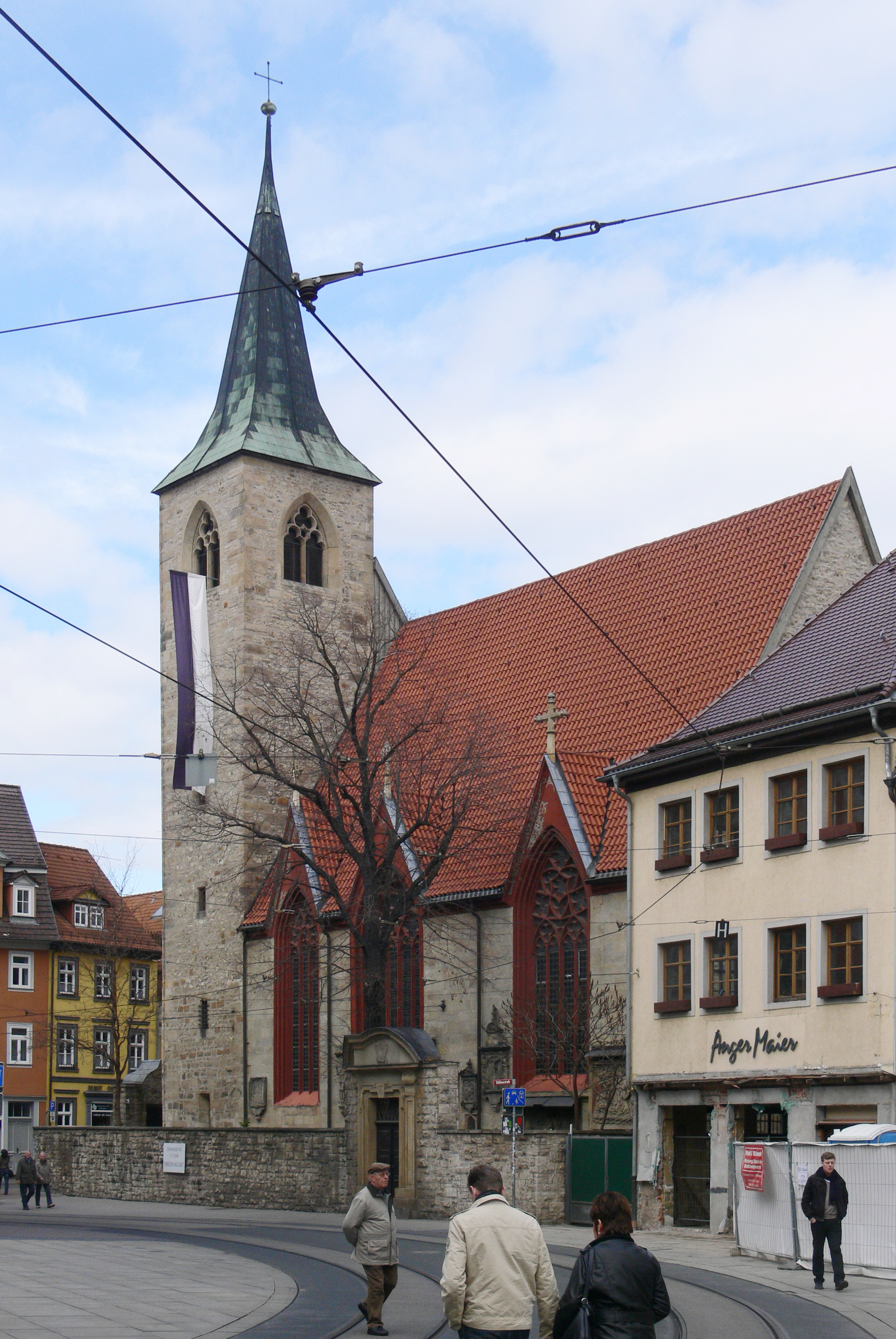
St Lawrence's Church

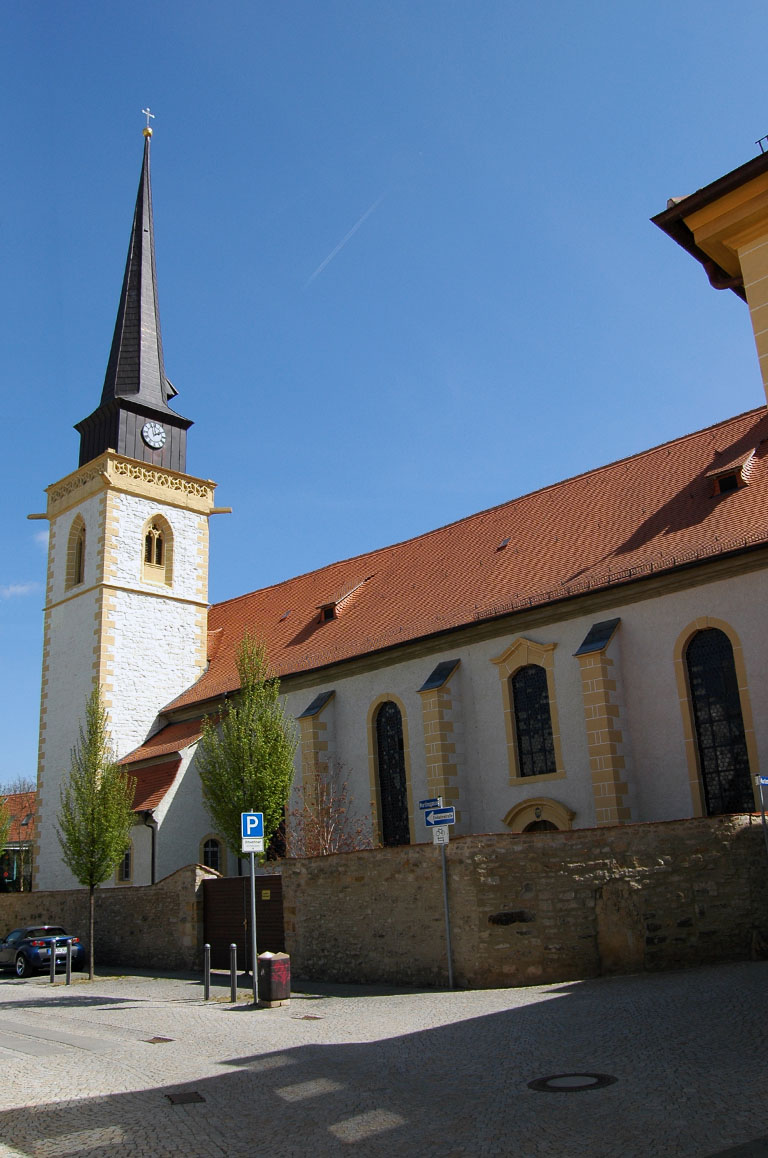
St Martin's Church

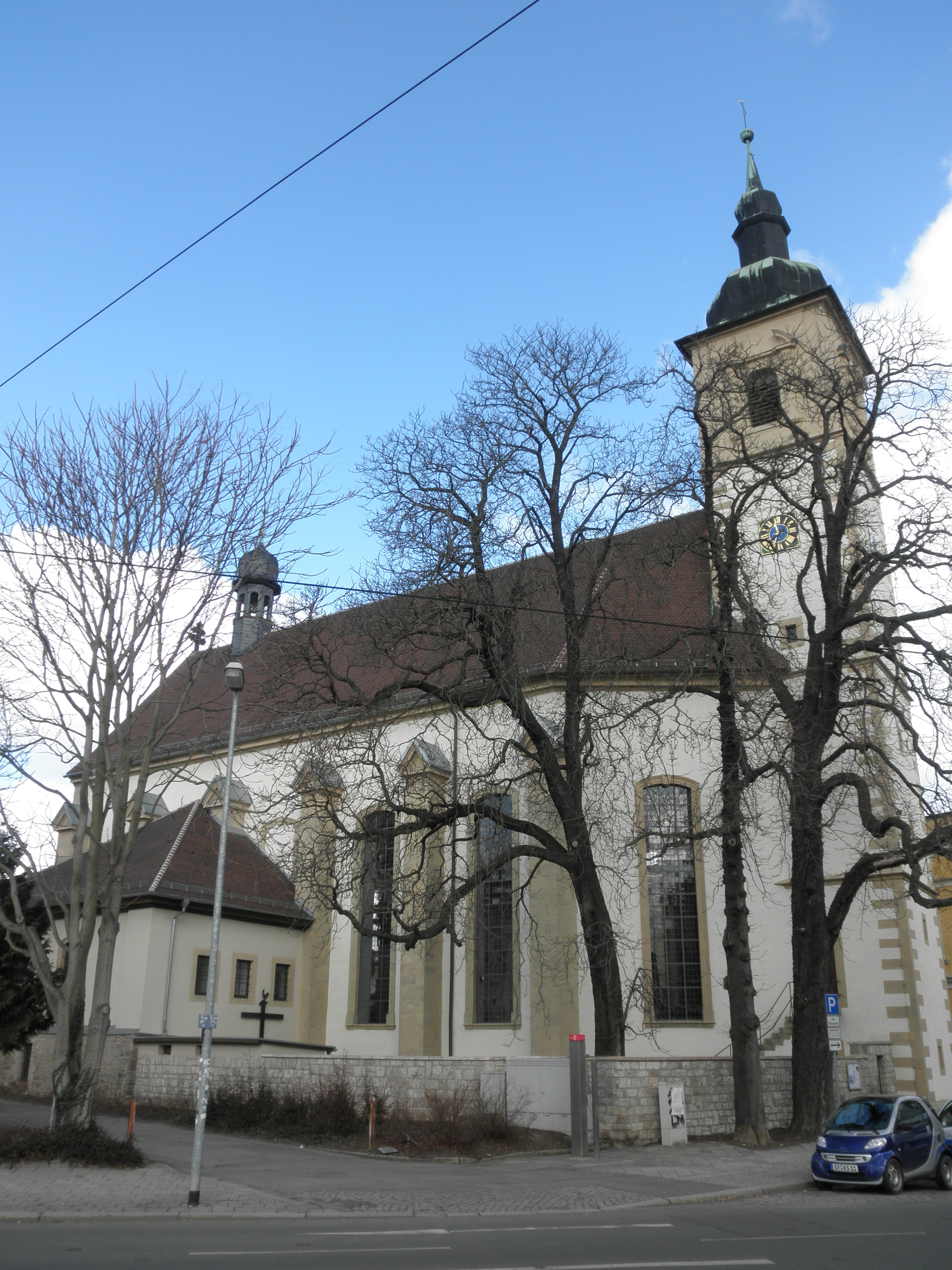
Holy Cross Church

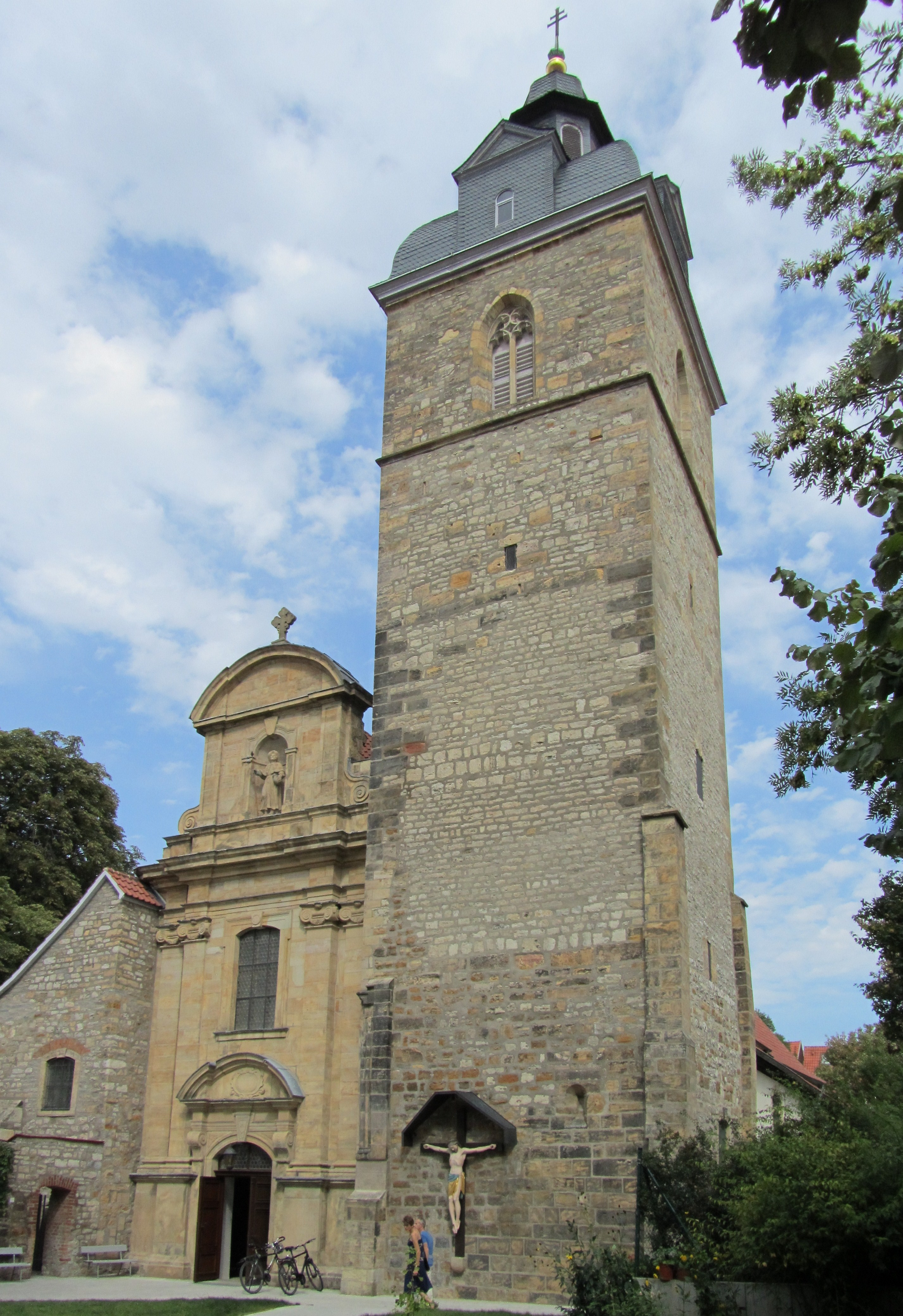
Schottenkirche

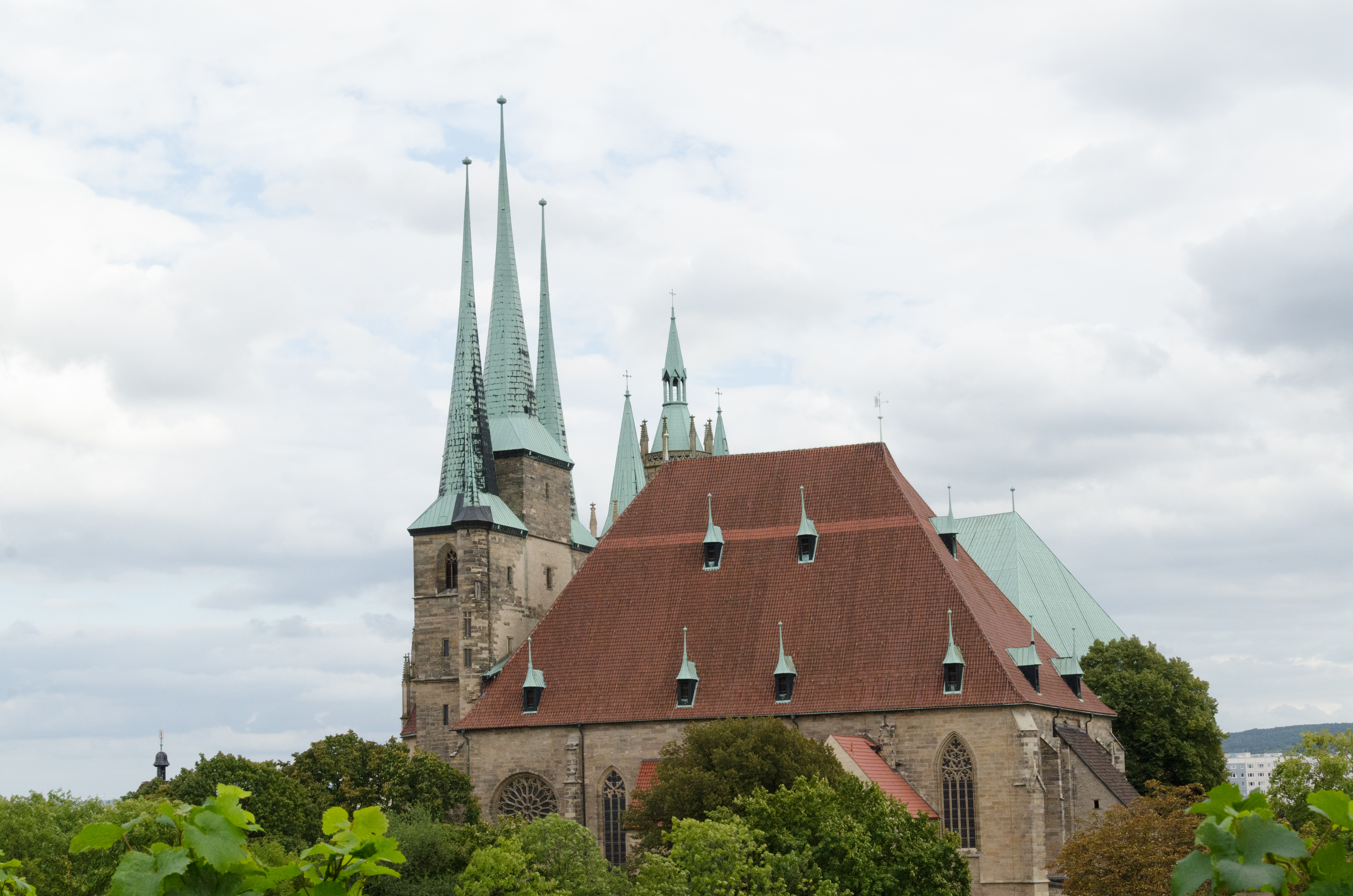
St Severus' Church

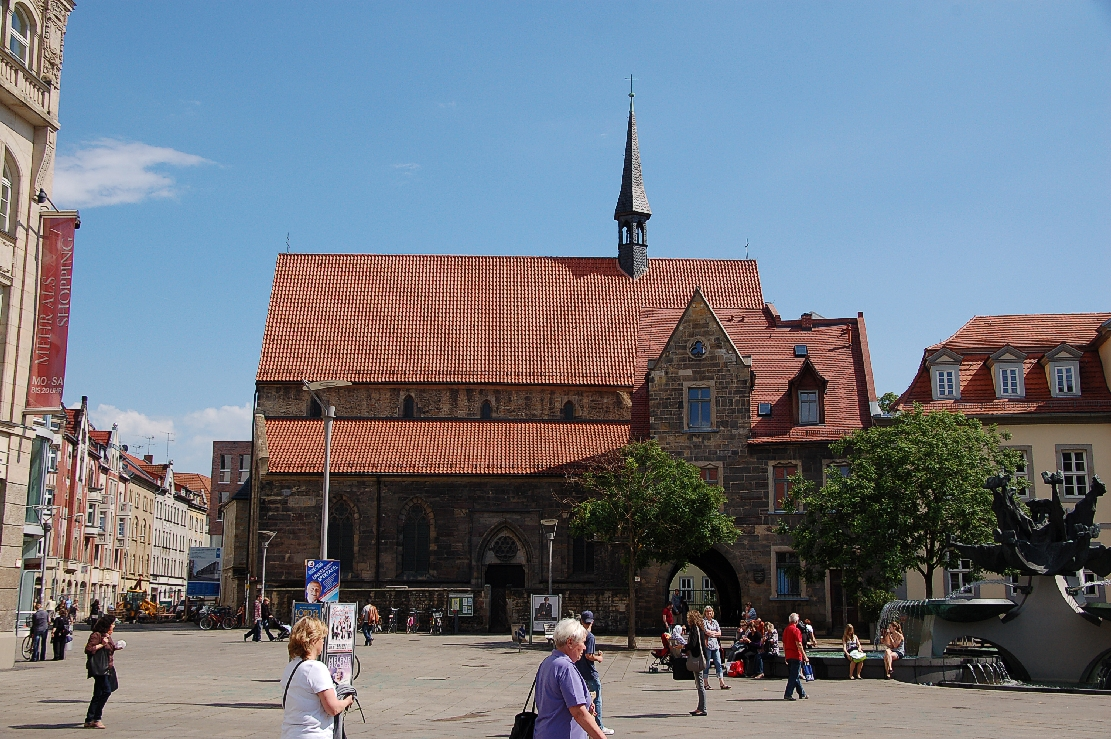
Ursulines Church

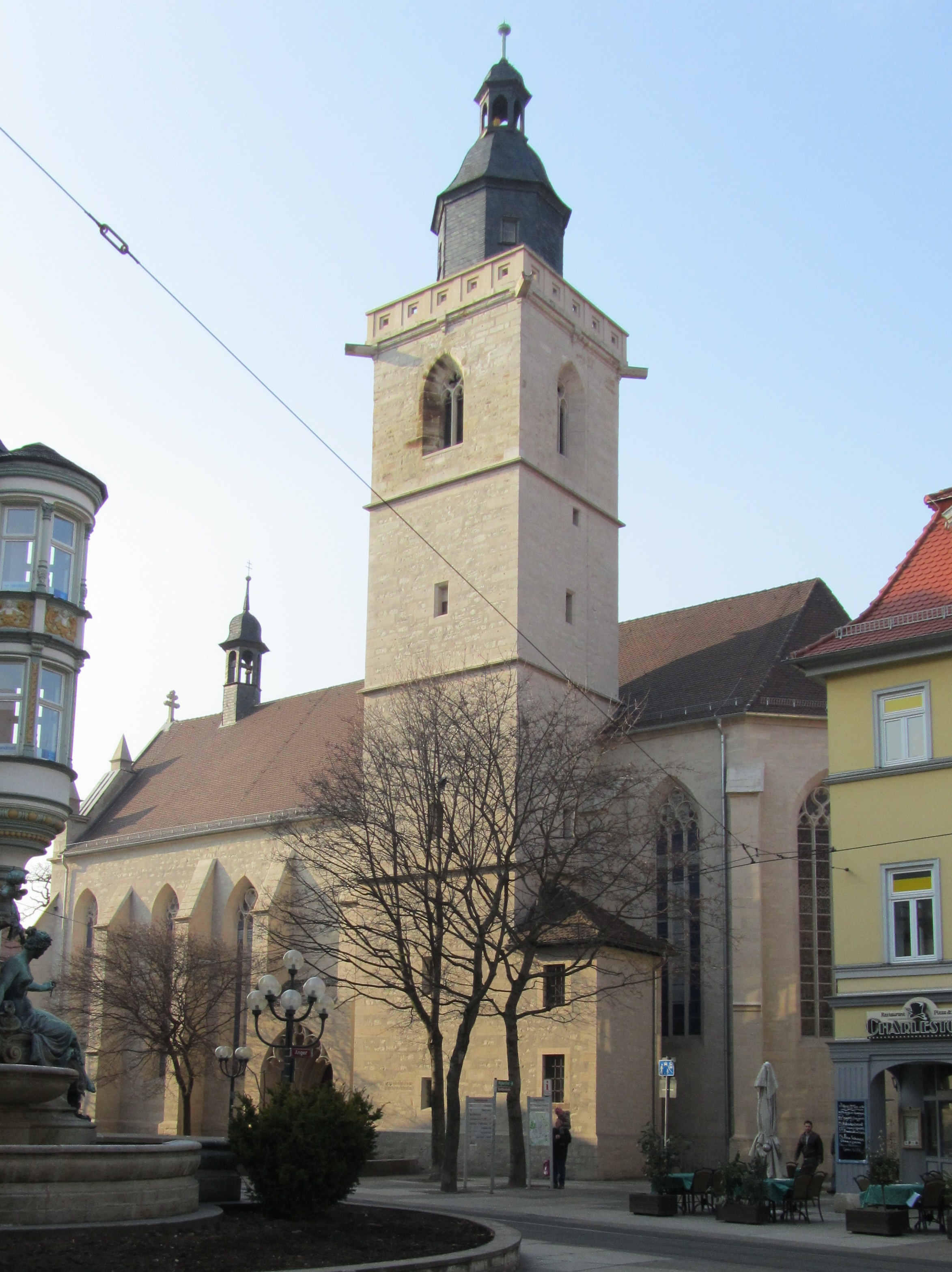
St Wigbert's Church

===== Protestant churches and monasteries =====
- Ägidienkirche (St Giles' Church) is a 14th-century Gothic parish church at Wenigemarkt Square. It is the surviving one of formerly two bridge-head churches of the Krämerbrücke located on both ends of the bridge. As a result, the nave is on the first floor, while on ground level is a passage to the bridge. The steeple is open to the public and offers a good view over the city centre. Today, St Giles' Church is a Methodist parish church.
- Andreaskirche (St. Andrew's Church) is a 14th-century Gothic parish church at Andreasstraße (Andrew's Street). The old craftsmen's quarter around it is named Andreasviertel after the church.
- Augustinerkloster (St Augustine's Monastery) dates from 1277. Martin Luther lived there as a monk between 1505 and 1511. The site has had a varied history and the restored complex has both modern and medieval buildings. Today it belongs to the Protestant Church in Germany and as well as being a place of worship it is also a meeting and conference centre, and provides simple guest accommodation. In 2016, an application was made for it to be included in the already existing UNESCO World Heritage Site "Luther sites in Central Germany".
- The Kaufmannskirche St. Gregor (Merchant's Church of St Gregory) is a 14th-century Gothic parish church at Anger square. It is one of the largest and most important original parish churches in Erfurt. The parents of Johann Sebastian Bach, Johann Ambrosius Bach and Maria Elisabeth Lämmerhirt, married here in 1668.
- Michaeliskirche (St Michael's Church) is a 13th-century Gothic parish church at Michaelisstraße. It became the church of the university in 1392. Erfurt's first Protestant sermon was preached here in 1521. The church tower contains Erfurt's oldest bell "Katharina", dating from 1380.
- The Predigerkirche (Dominican Church) is a Gothic monastery church of the Dominicans at Predigerstraße. Since the Reformation in the 16th century, it is the main Protestant church of Erfurt and furthermore one of the largest former churches of the mendicant orders in Germany. The theologian and mystic Meister Eckhart (c. 1260–1328) entered Prediger Monastery around 1275. He was Prior from 1294 until 1298, and Vicar of Thuringia from 1298 to 1302. After a year in Paris, he returned to the monastery in 1303 and administered his duties as Provincial of Saxony from there until 1311. The baroque composer Johann Pachelbel (1653–1706) was organist at the church from 1678 until 1690.
- The Reglerkirche St. Augustinus (Regulated St Augustine's Church) is a 12th-century Romanesque-Gothic monastery church of the Augustinians at Bahnhofstraße (Station Street). After the Reformation, it became a Protestant parish church.
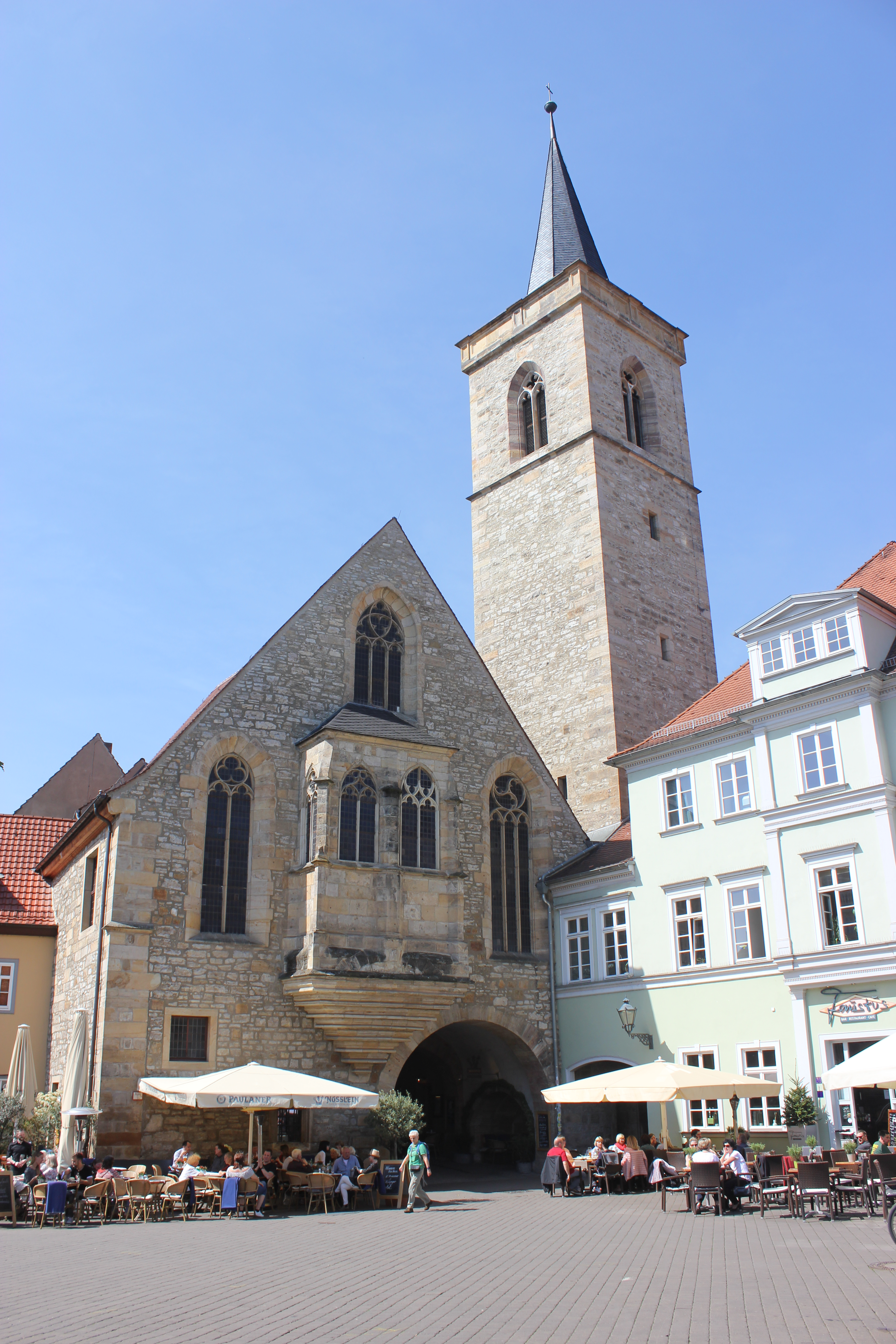
St Giles' Church

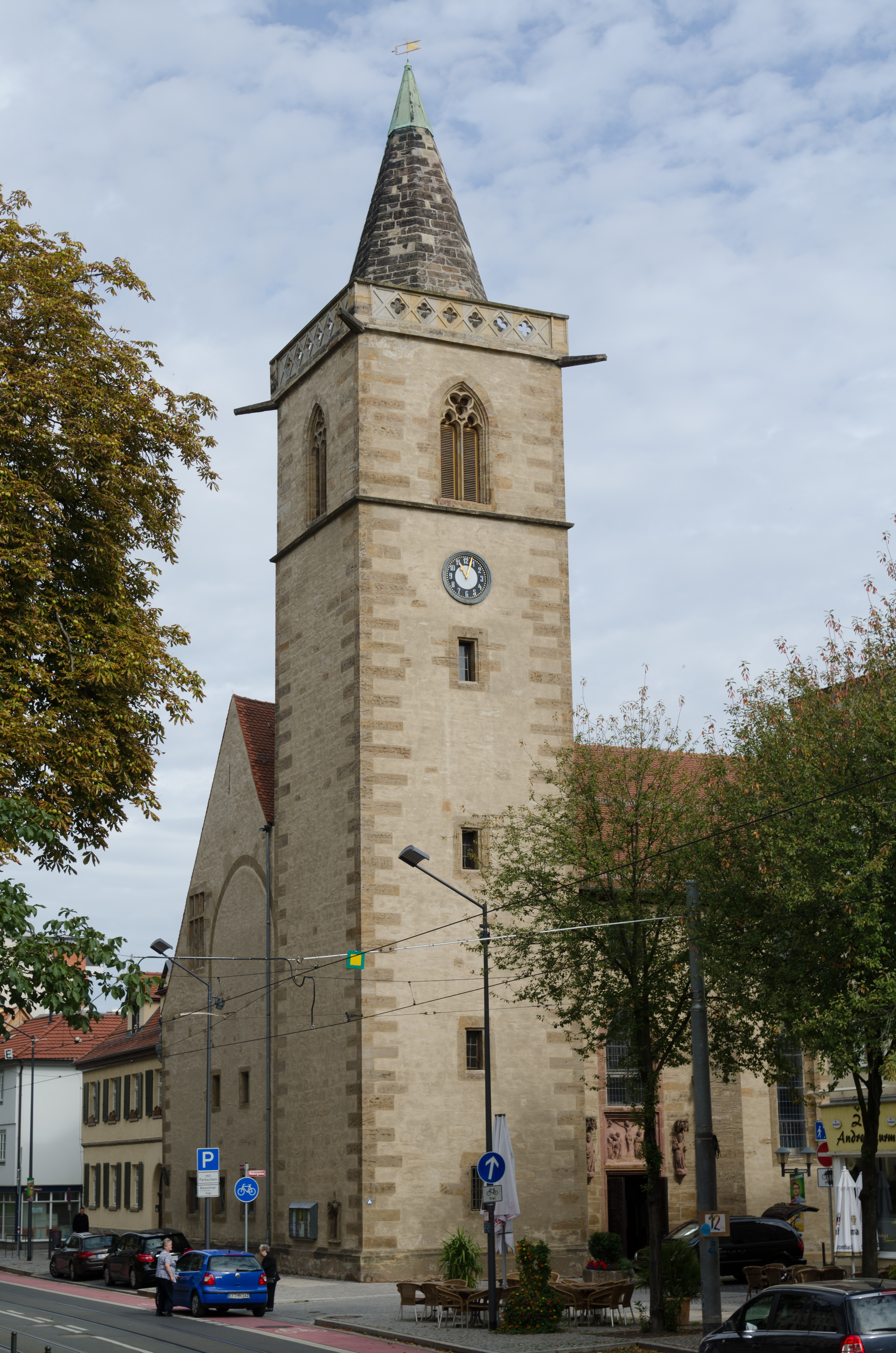
St Andrew's Church

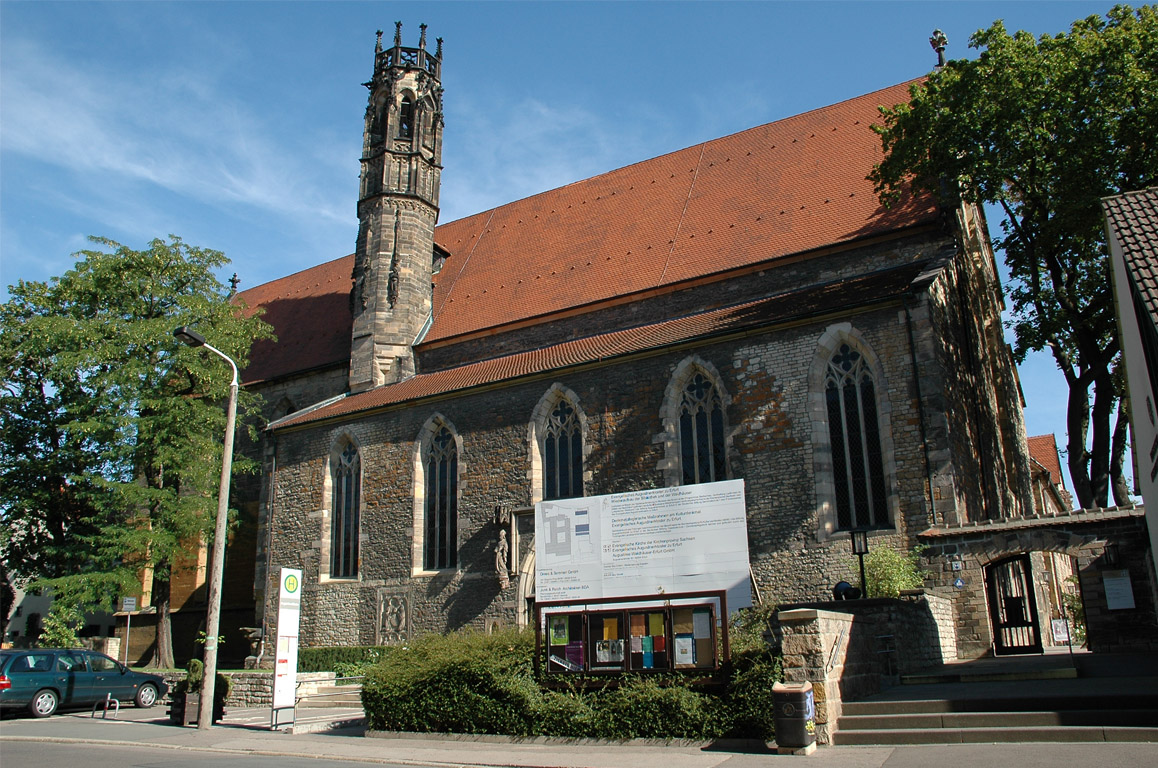
St Augustine's Church

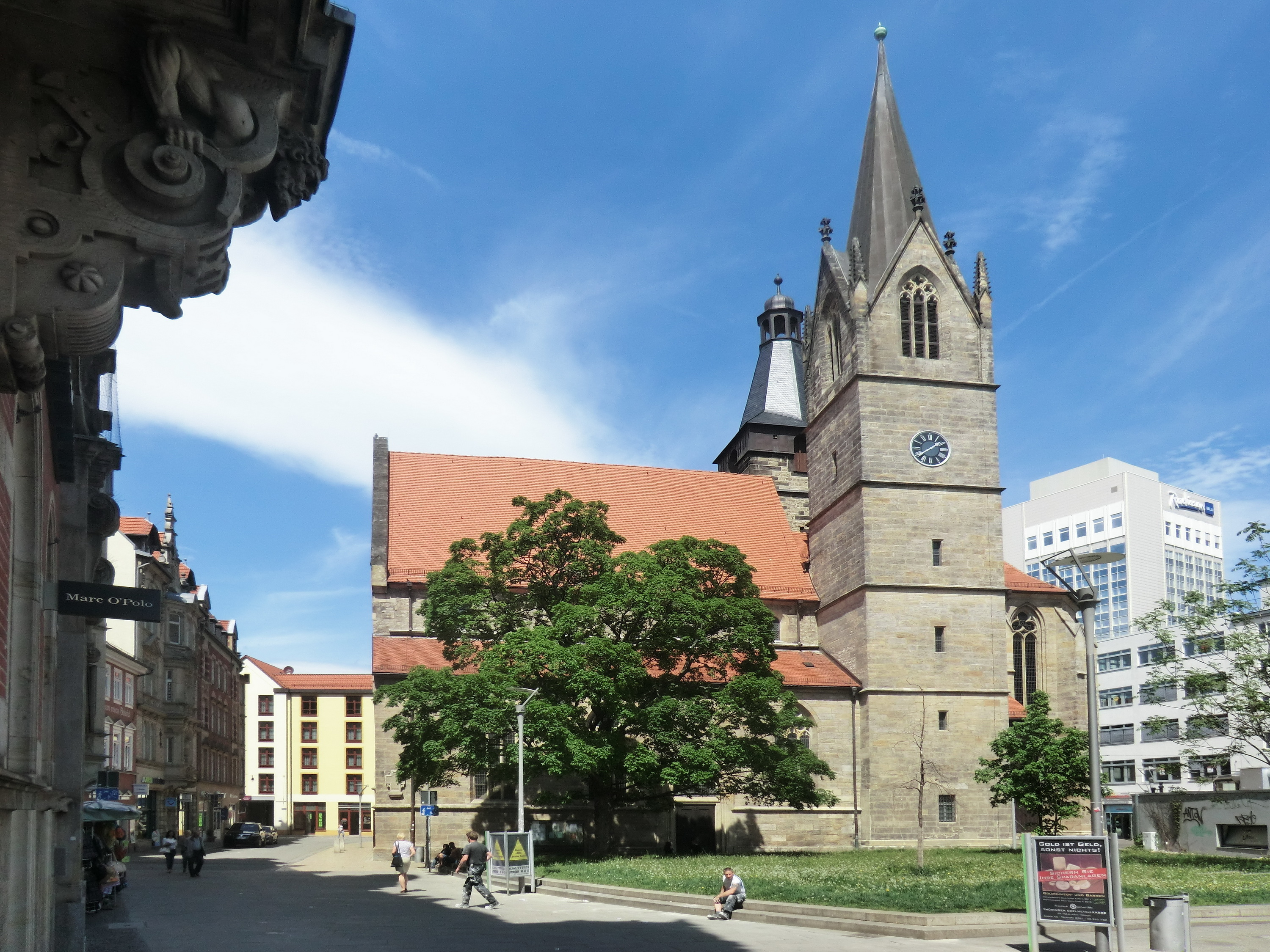
Merchants' Church

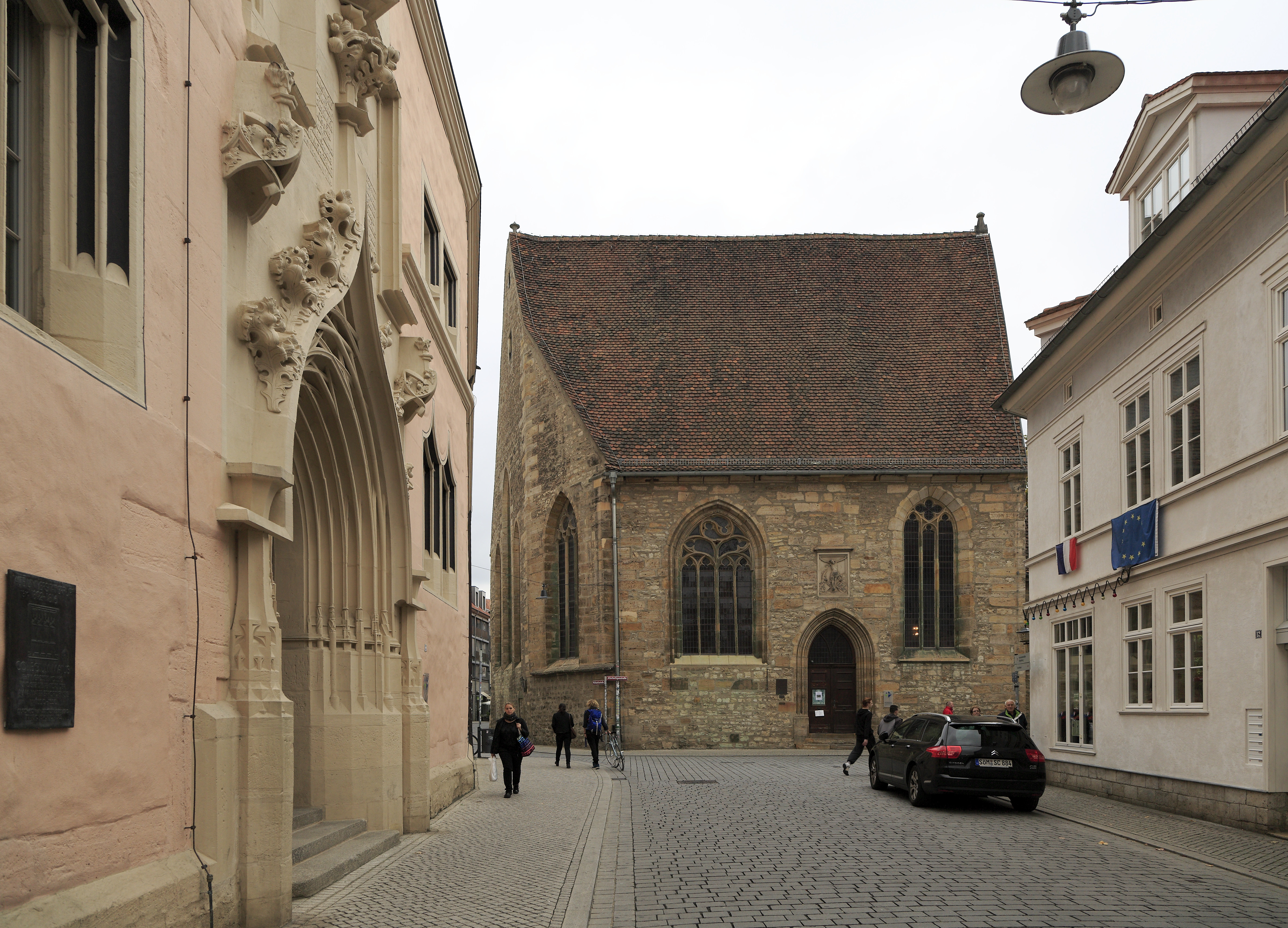
St Michael's Church

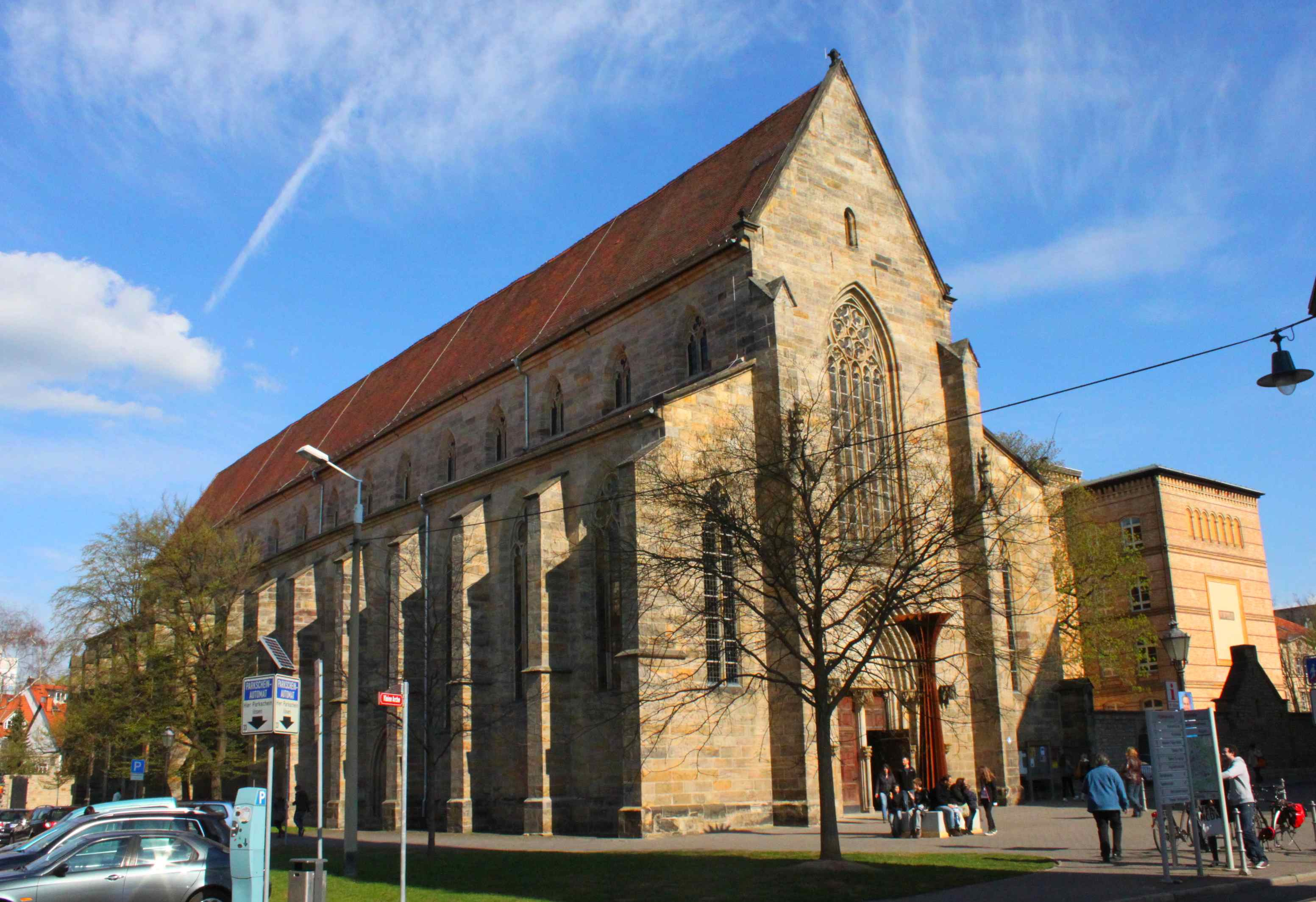
Dominican Church

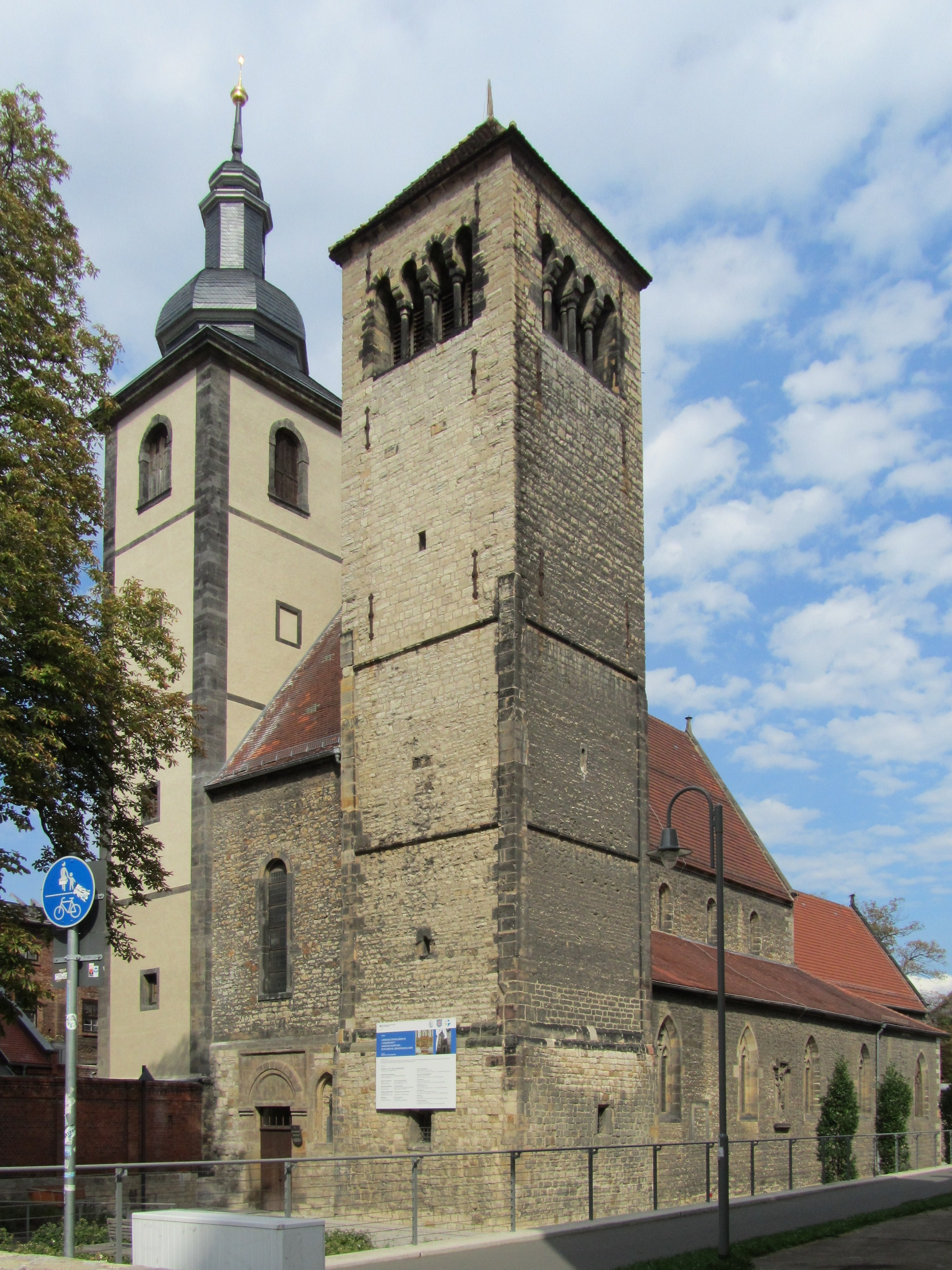
Regulated St Augustine's Church

===== Former churches =====
- The Barfüßerkirche is a 14th-century Gothic mendicant church at Barfüßerstraße. The former Franciscan monastery became a Protestant parish church after the Reformation. In 1944, the church was severely damaged by allied bombing. Its high choir was restored, but the nave's ruins have been preserved as a war memorial.
- The Bartholomäuskirche (St Bartholomew's Church) was a Gothic parish church at Anger Square. The church was demolished in 1715 and only the steeple remained. Today, the tower hosts a carillon with 60 bells.
- The Georgskirche (St George's Church) was a parish church in Michaelisstraße. It was demolished in 1632 and only the church tower now remains.
- The Hospitalkirche (Hospital Church) was the church of the former Great City Hospital at Juri-Gagarin-Ring. It is a 14th-century Gothic building and is used today as a depot by the Museum für Thüringer Volkskunde (Museum of Thuringian Ethnology).
- The Johanneskirche (St John's Church) was a parish church at John's Street. It was demolished in 1819, but the steeple remained.
- The Kartäuserkirche St. Salvatorberg (Carthusian Church, Mount St Saviour) was a monastery church at Kartäuserstraße. The Baroque church was closed in 1803 and afterwards used for many different purposes. Today, it is part of a housing complex.
- The Nikolaikirche (St Nicholas' Church) was a parish church in Augustine's Street. It was demolished in 1747, and only the steeple remained.
- The Paulskirche (St Paul's Church) was a parish church in Paul's Street. It was demolished before 1759. The steeple remains and is in use as the belfry of the Prediger Church.
- The Peterskirche (St Peter's Church) was built in the 12th century in Romanesque style as a church of the Benedictine monastery of St Peter and Paul on Petersberg hill, now the site of Petersberg Citadel. It was secularised in 1803 and used as a military store house. Today it houses an art gallery.
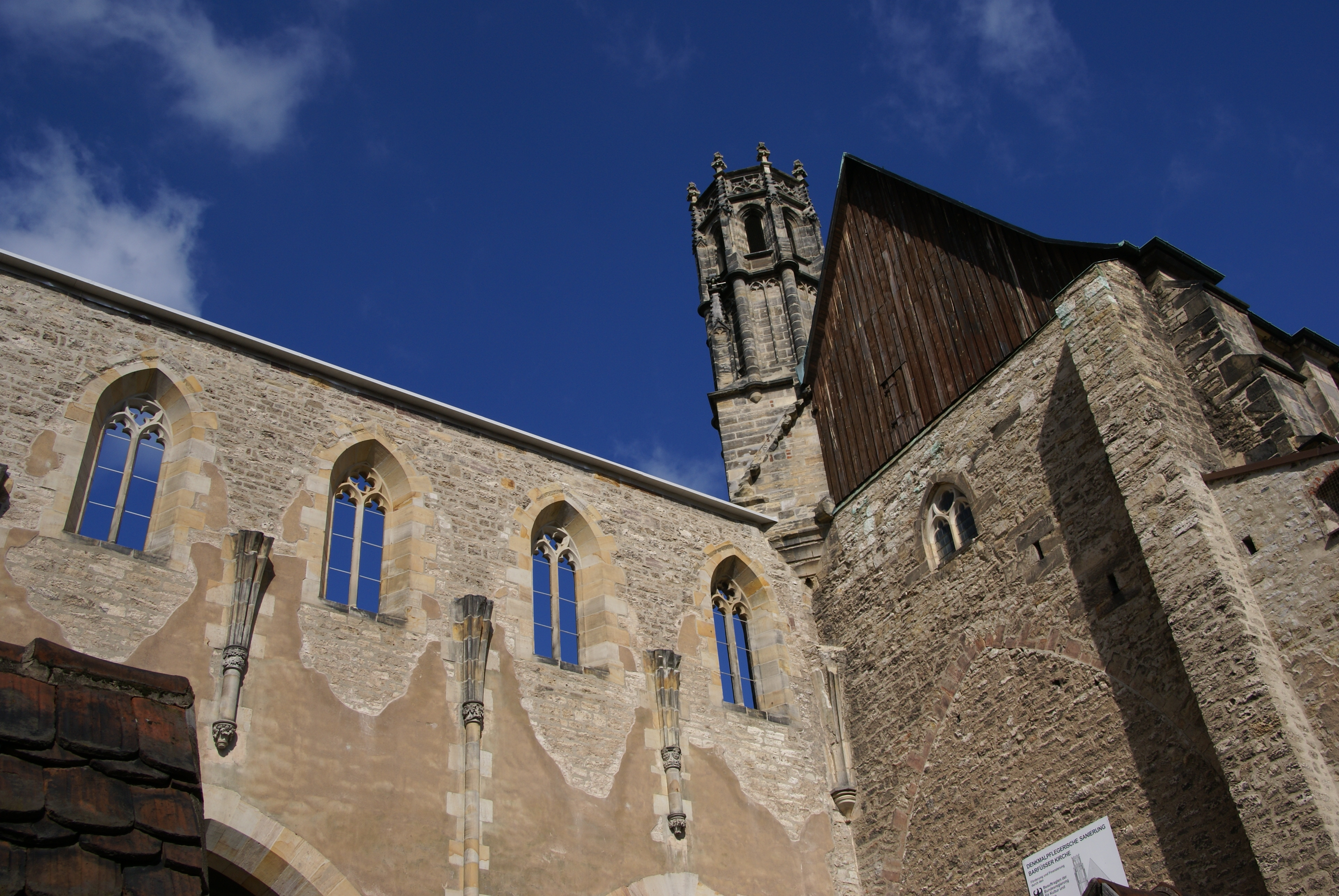
Ruins of the former Franciscan monastery's church

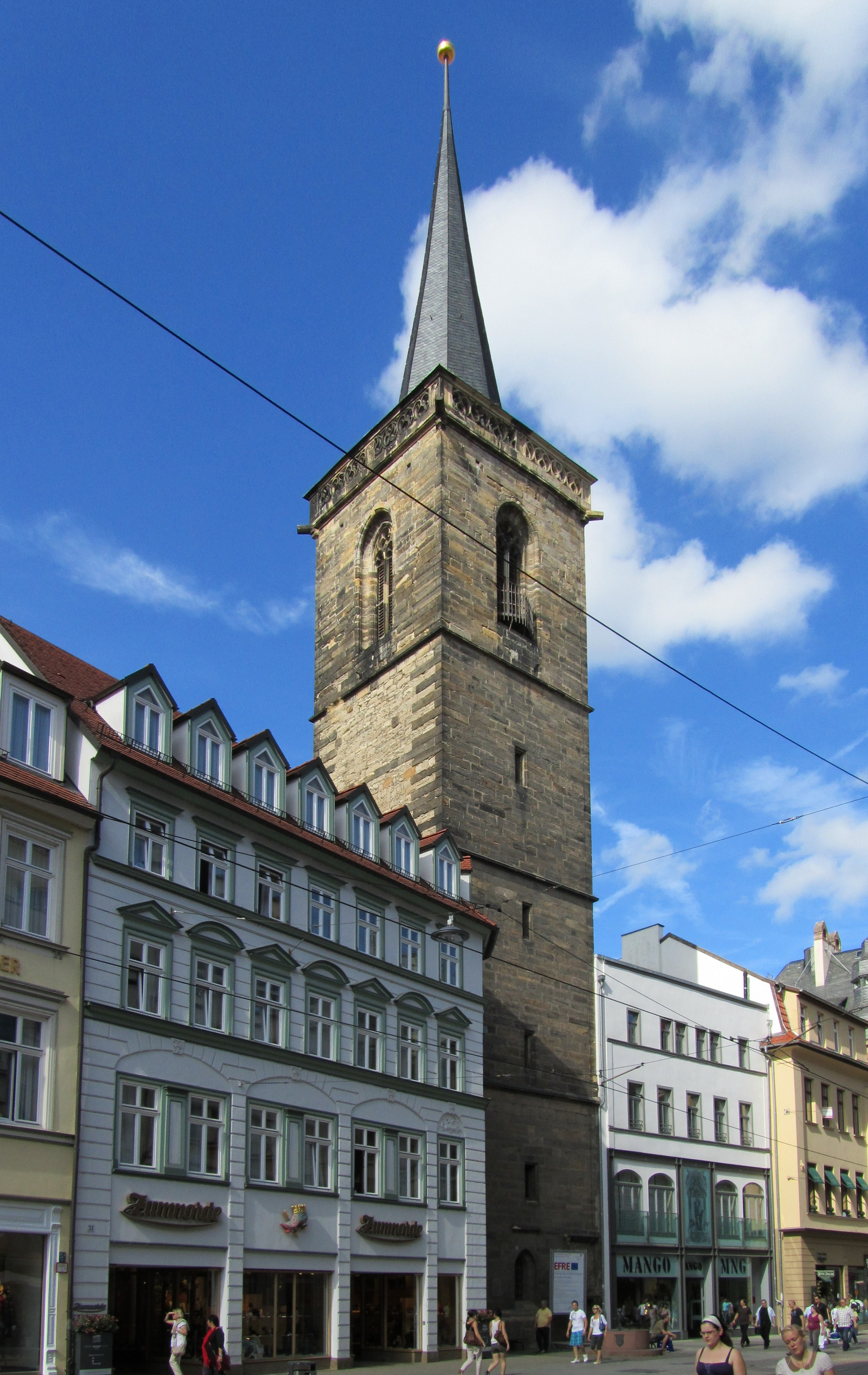
St Bartholomew's steeple

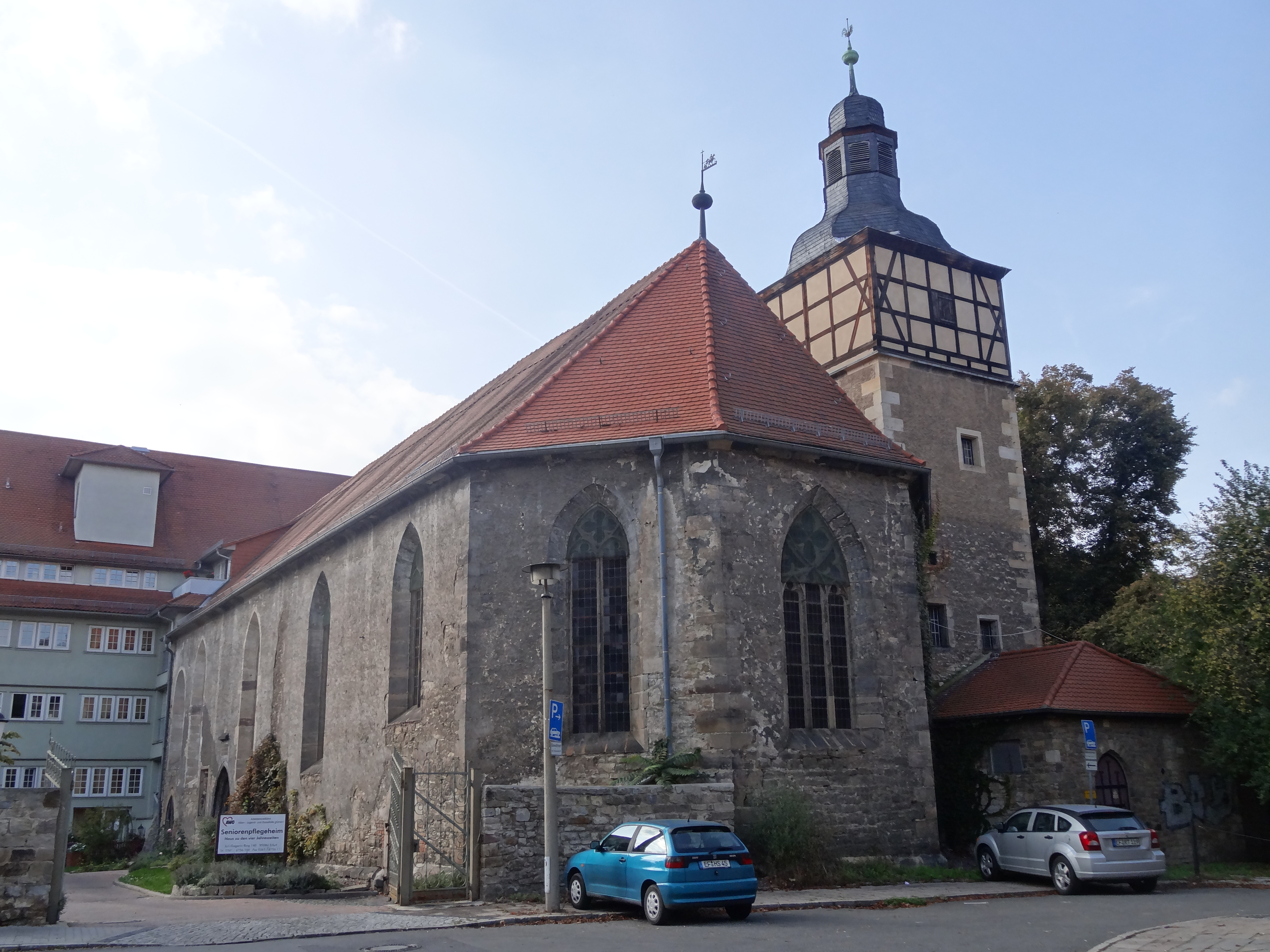
Hospital Church

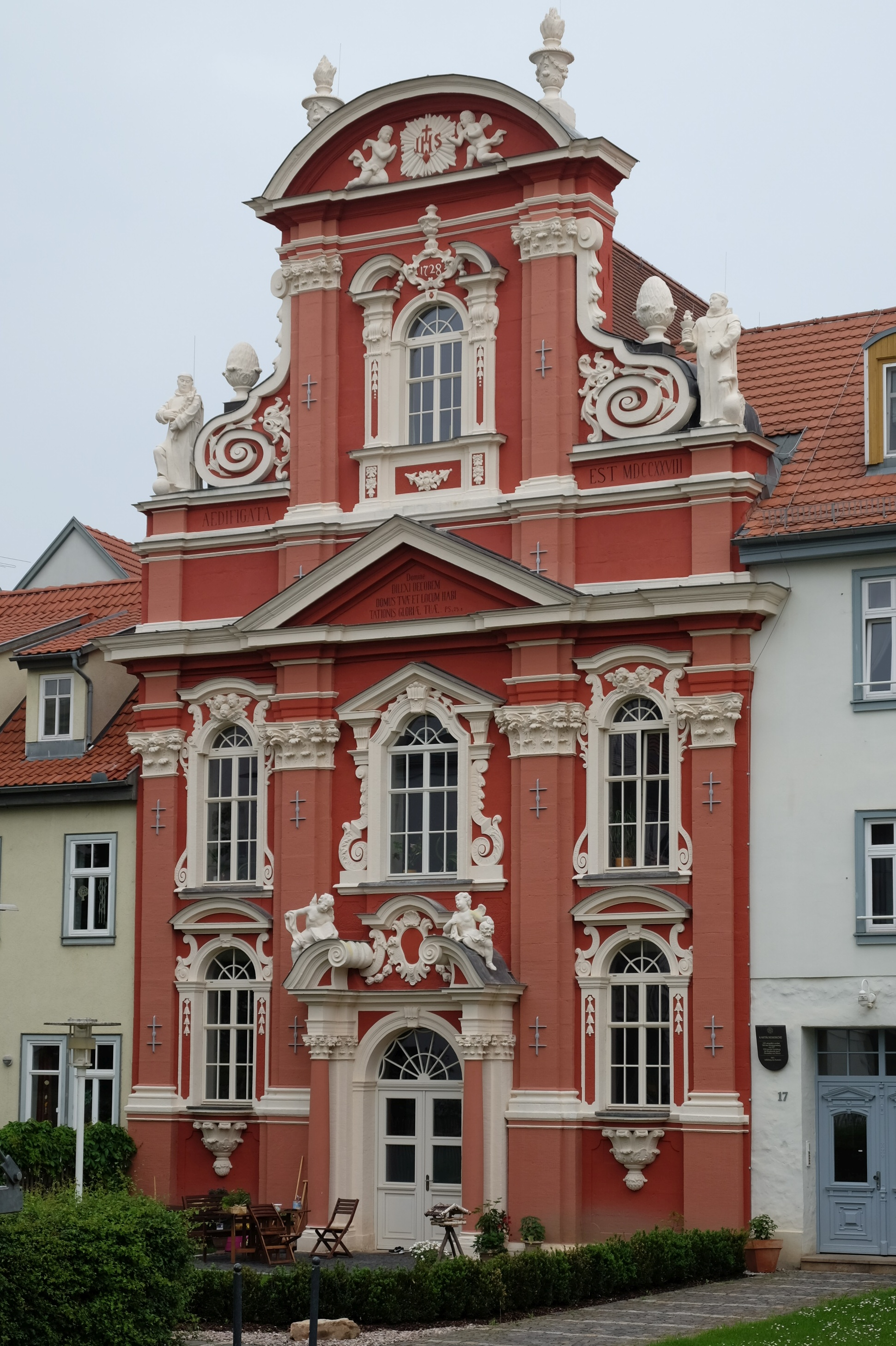
Carthusian Church

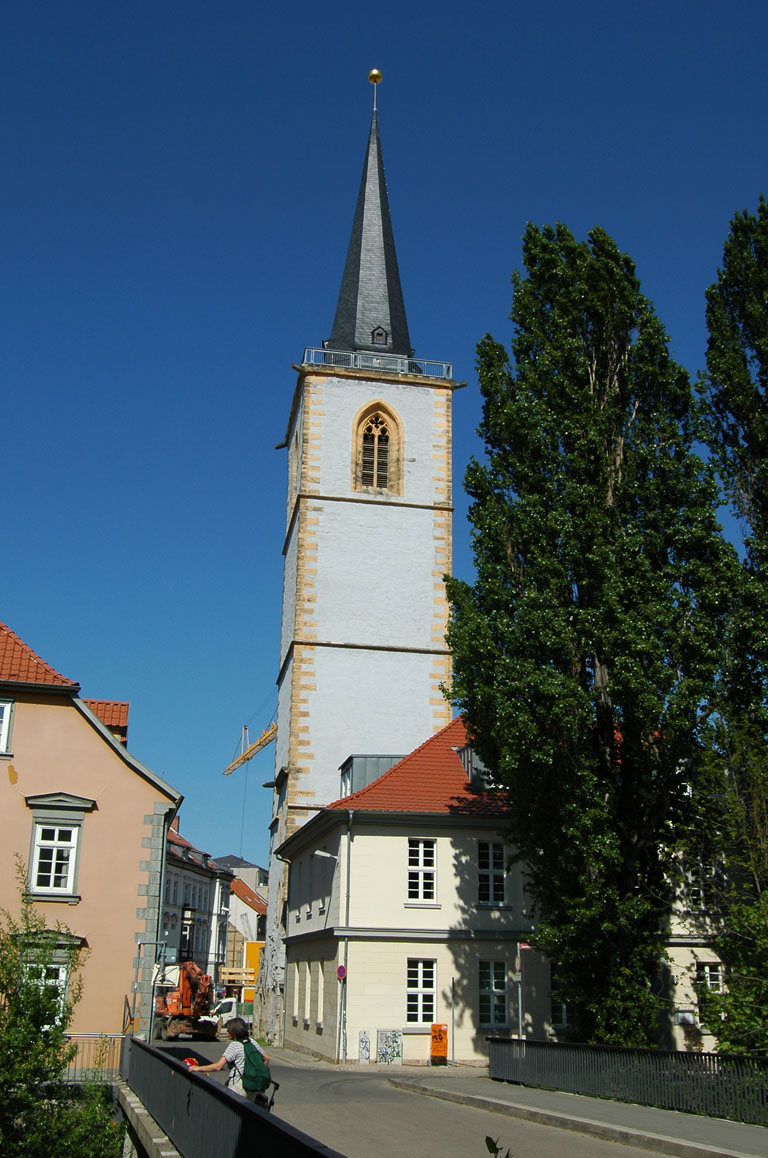
St Nicholas' steeple

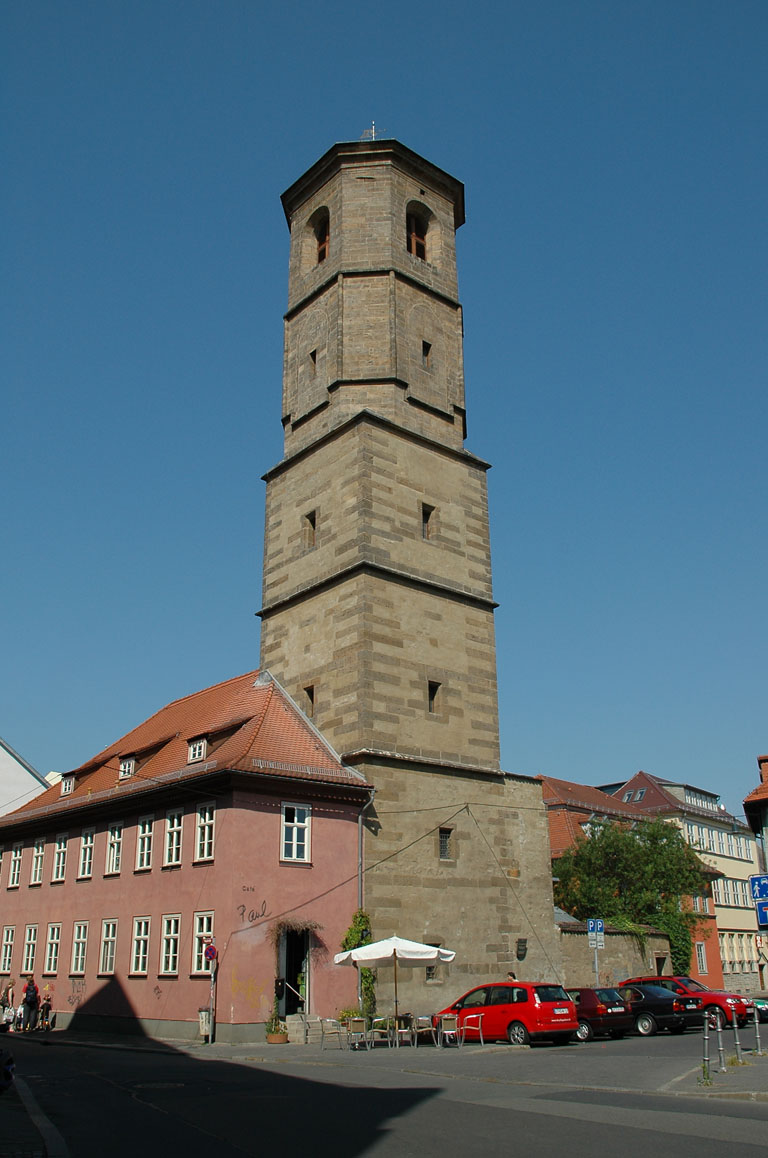
St Paul's steeple

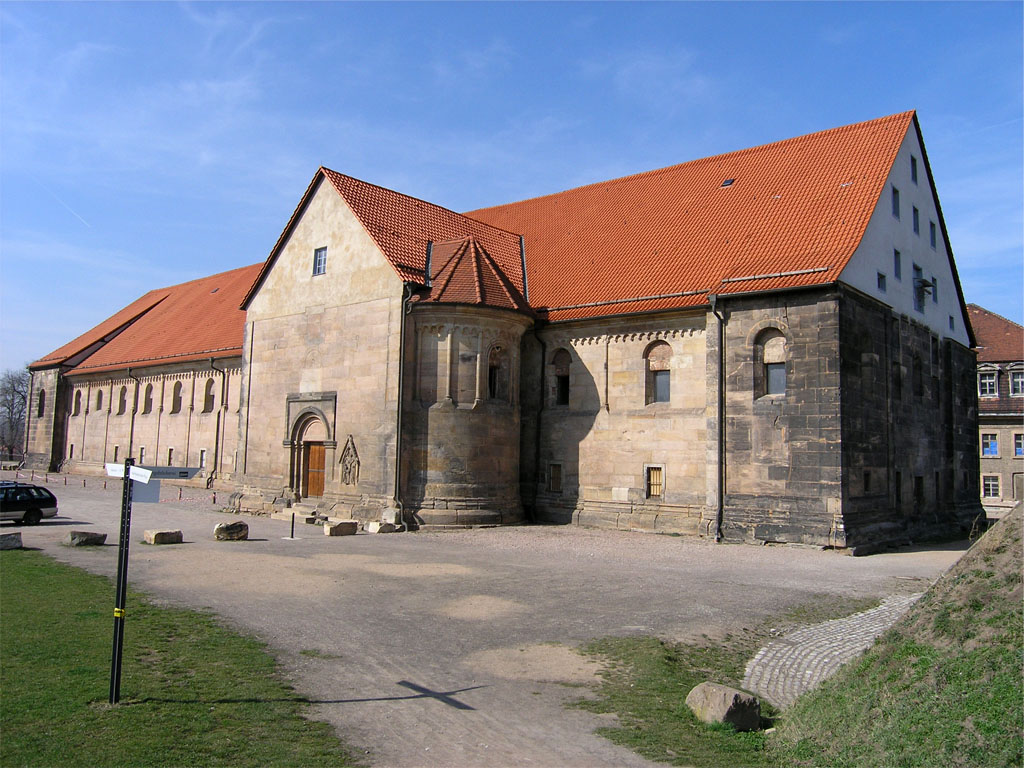
St Peter's Church

===== Synagogues =====
The oldest parts of Erfurt's Alte Synagoge (Old Synagogue) date to the 11th century. It was used until 1349, when the Jewish community was destroyed in a pogrom known as the Erfurt Massacre. The building had many other uses since then. It was conserved in the 1990s and in 2009 it became a museum of Jewish history. A rare Mikveh, a ritual bath, dating from c.1250, was discovered by archeologists in 2007. It has been accessible to visitors on guided tours since September 2011. The Jewish heritage of Erfurt including the Old Synagogue and Mikveh became a UNESCO World Heritage Site in September 2023 and is the second Jewish heritage in Germany that is listed on UNESCO.

As religious freedom was granted in the 19th century, some Jews returned to Erfurt. They built their synagogue on the banks of the Gera river and used it from 1840 until 1884. The neoclassical building is known as the Kleine Synagoge (Small Synagogue). Today it is used as an events centre. It is also open to visitors.

A larger synagogue, the Große Synagoge (Great Synagogue), was opened in 1884 because the community had become larger and wealthier. This moorish style building was destroyed during nationwide Nazi riots, known as Kristallnacht on 9–10 November 1938.

In 1947 the land which the Great Synagogue had occupied was returned to the Jewish community and they built their current place of worship, the Neue Synagoge (New Synagogue) which opened in 1952. It was the only synagogue building erected under communist rule in East Germany.

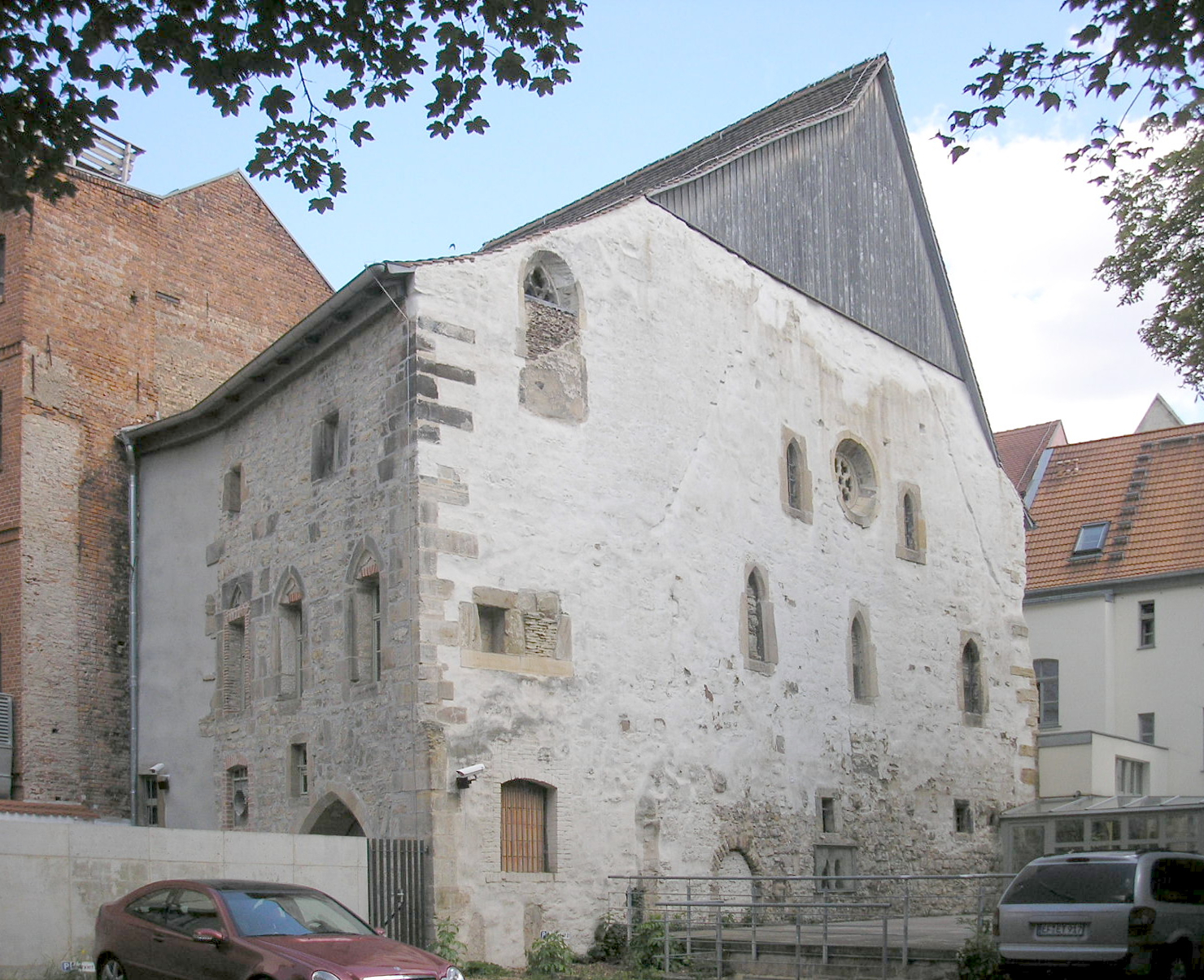
Old Synagogue

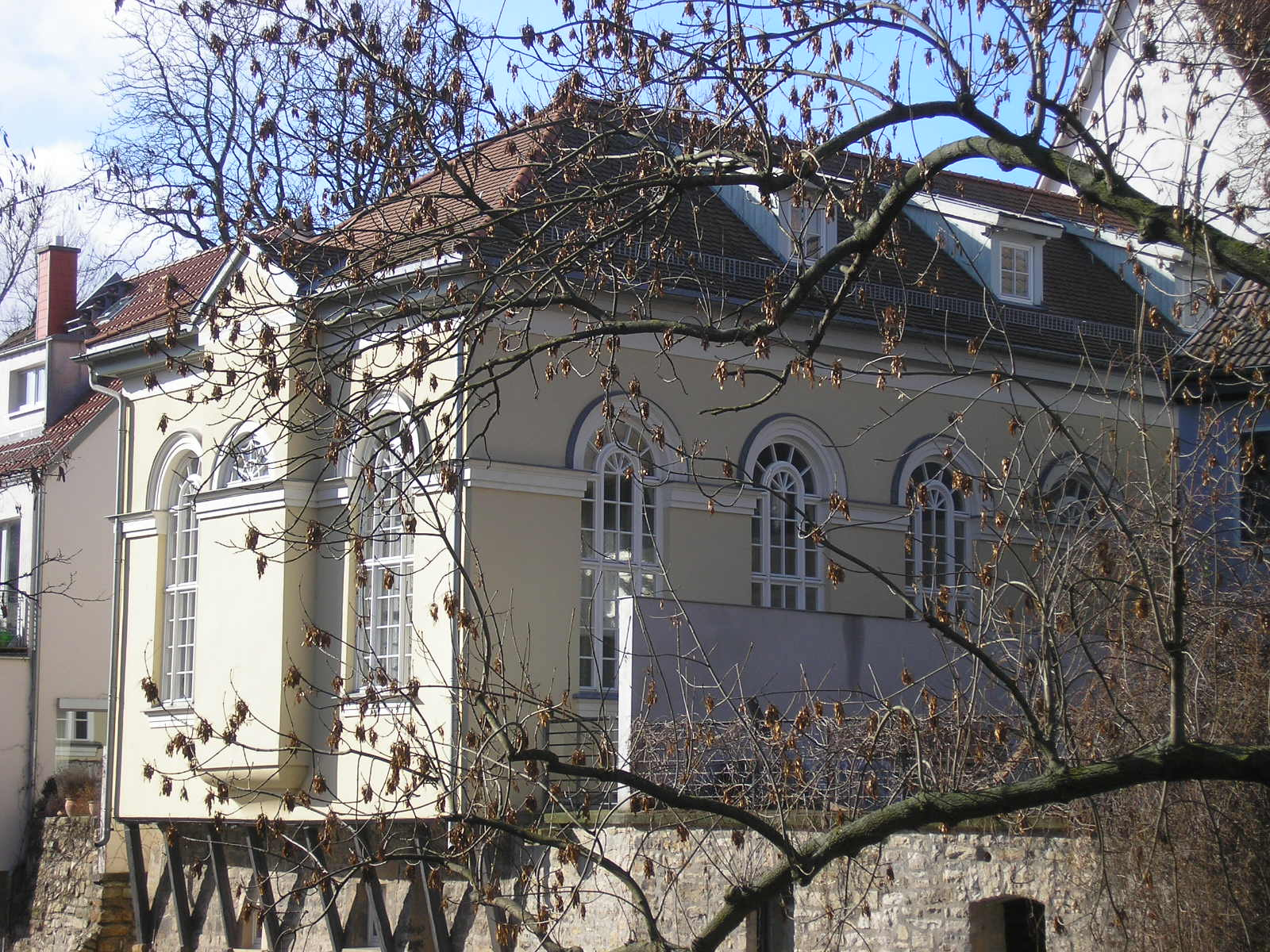
Small Synagogue

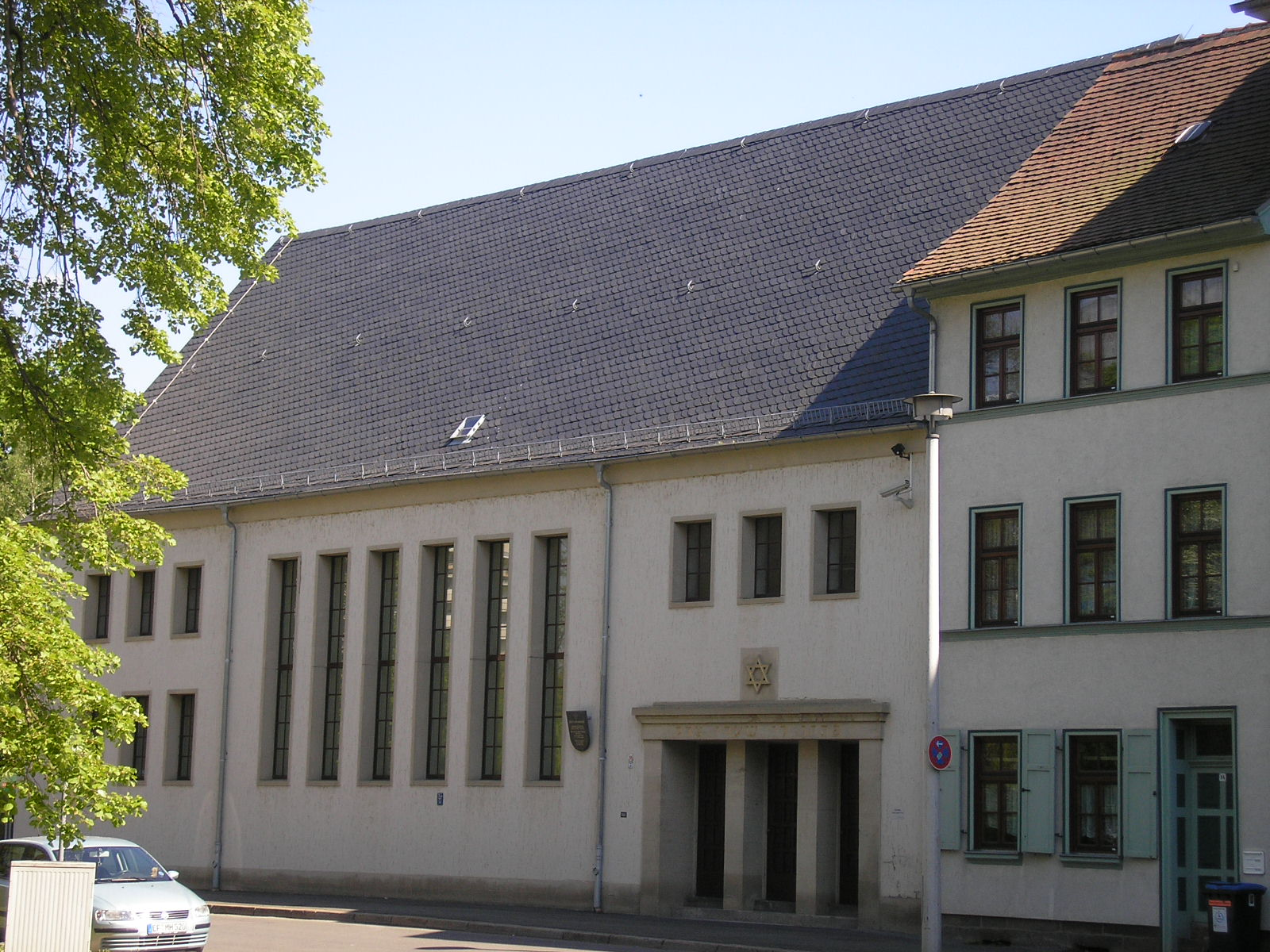
New Synagogue

==== Secular architecture ====
Besides the religious buildings there is a lot of historic secular architecture in Erfurt, mostly concentrated in the city centre, but some 19th- and 20th-century buildings are located on the outskirts.

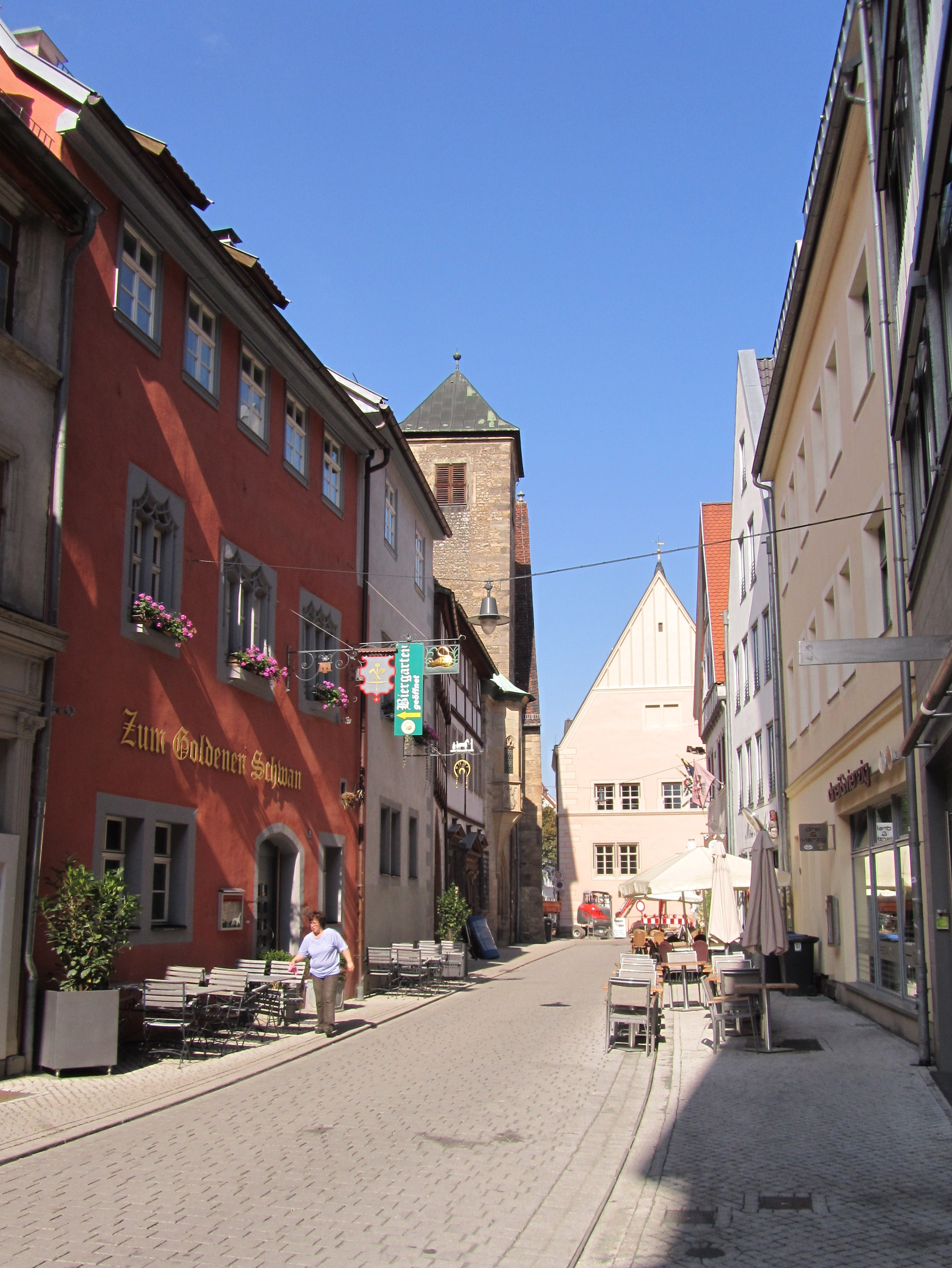
The Michaelisstraße is known as the lithic chronicle of Erfurt.

===== Street and square ensembles =====
- The Krämerbrücke (Merchants' bridge) is the most famous tourist attraction of Erfurt. This 15th-century bridge is completely covered with dwellings and unique in Europe north of the Alps. Today, there are some art handicraft and souvenir shops in the houses.
- The Domplatz (Cathedral Square) is the largest square in Erfurt and one of the largest historical market squares in Germany. The cathedral and St Severus' Church on its western side can be reached over the Domstufen, a wide flight of stairs. On the north side lies the courthouse, a historic building from 1880. The eastern and southern side is fronted by early-modern patrician houses. On the square are the Minerva Fountain from 1784 and the Erthal Obelisk from 1777. The Domplatz is the main setting of the Erfurt Christmas Market in December and the location for "DomStufen-Festival", an open-air theatre festival in summer.
- The Fischmarkt (Fish Market) is the central square of Erfurt's city centre. It is surrounded by renaissance-style patrician houses and the town hall, a neo-gothic building from 1882. In the middle of the square is a statue called Römer (Roman), a symbol of the city's independence, erected by the citizens in 1591.
- The Wenigemarkt (Minor Market) is a small square on the east side of the Gera river (opposite to the Fischmarkt on the west side), surrounded by early-modern patrician and merchants' houses. The fountain on this square with the sculpture "Scuffling Boys" was created in 1975. Today, Wenigemarkt square also has various cafés and bars. Next to the Wenigemarkt in Futterstraße is the Kaisersaal building, a neoclassicistic event hall from 1831 (current building). The Congress of Erfurt took place here in 1808.
- The Anger (originally the German term for "village green") is a protracted square in the eastern city centre. All tram lines are linked here, so that it became the new city centre during the 20th century with many important buildings. On its northern side is the main post office, built in 1886 in neo-gothic style with its prominent clock tower. In the north-east there is the Martin Luther monument from 1889 in front of the Merchants' Church. Between the church and the Ursuline monastery lies the "Anger 1" department store from 1908. On the south side next to Station Street is the Angermuseum, the art history museum of Erfurt, inside a Baroque palace from 1711. The western part of Anger square is surrounded by large historicist business houses from the late 19th century. The west end of the square is marked by the Angerbrunnen fountain from 1890. The Jesuit College near Schlösserstraße was built in 1737 and used until the ban of the Jesuits in 1773.
- The Willy Brandt Square is the southern gate to the city centre in front of the main station. Opposite to the station is the former hotel Erfurter Hof, where the first meeting of the East- and West-German heads of government took place in 1970. On the western side is the building of the old Erfurt station (1847–95) with a clock tower and the former offices of the Thuringian Railway Company.
- The Hirschgarten (Deer Garden) is a small park in front of the Thuringian government seat in the western city centre. The minister-president's seat is the Kurmainzische Statthalterei, a Renaissance-Baroque palace from the 17th century.
- The Michaelisstraße (Michael's Street) is known as "the lithic chronicle of Erfurt", because of its mostly medieval buildings. It is the main street of the Latin quarter around the old university and today one of the favourite nightlife districts of the Erfurters with various bars, restaurants and cafés. The central building of the old university, Collegium Maius, was built in 1515, destroyed by Allied bombs in 1945 and originally rebuilt in 1999.
- The Juri-Gagarin-Ring is an inner-city circular road following the former inner city wall. The road was set out in the 1890s by closing a branch of the Gera river. The buildings along the street originate from all periods of the 20th century, including some GDR-era highrise residence buildings. An old building complex here is the former Great Hospital, established in the 14th century. Today, it hosts the museum of popular art and cultural anthropology.
- The Andreasviertel (St Andrew's Quarter) is a small quarter in the northern part of the city centre between Domplatz in the south-west and Moritzwallstraße in the north-east. It was the former craftsmen quarter with narrow alleys and old (16th/17th century) little houses. During the 20th century, there were plans to demolish the quarter because of its bad housing conditions. After 1990, the houses were redeveloped by private individuals so that it is one of the favourite neighbourhoods today. The largest building here is the former Municipal Corn Storage in Gothic style from 1466 with a floor area of 1,800 m^{2} (19,375 sq ft).
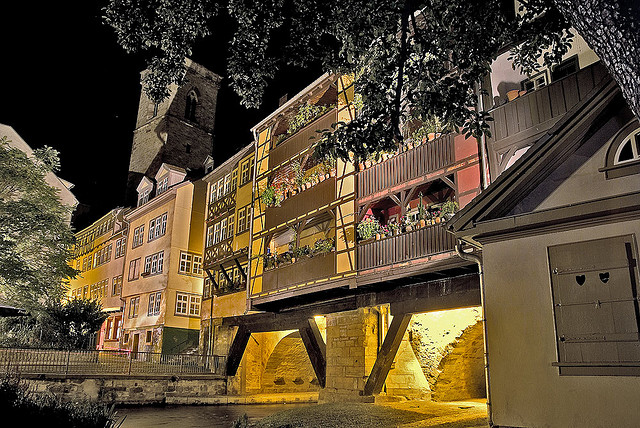
Krämerbrücke

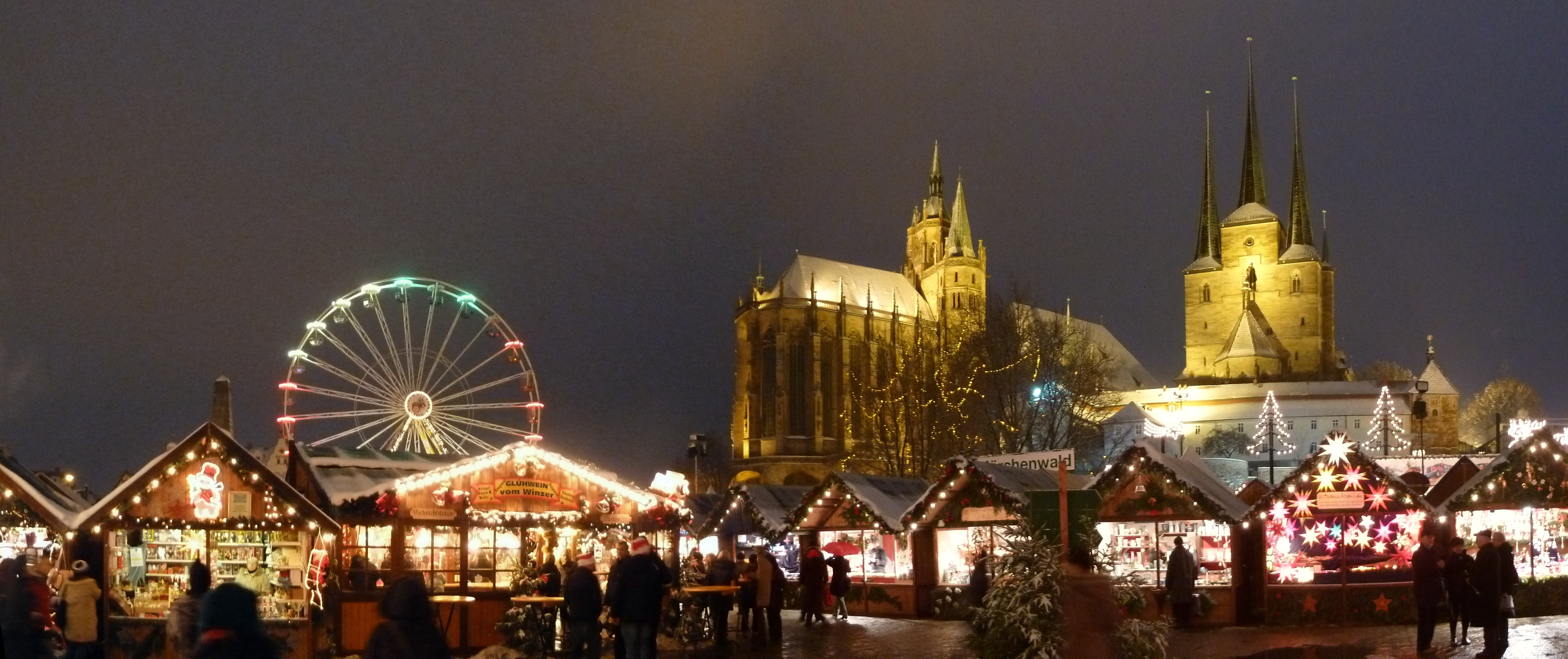
Christmas market at Domplatz

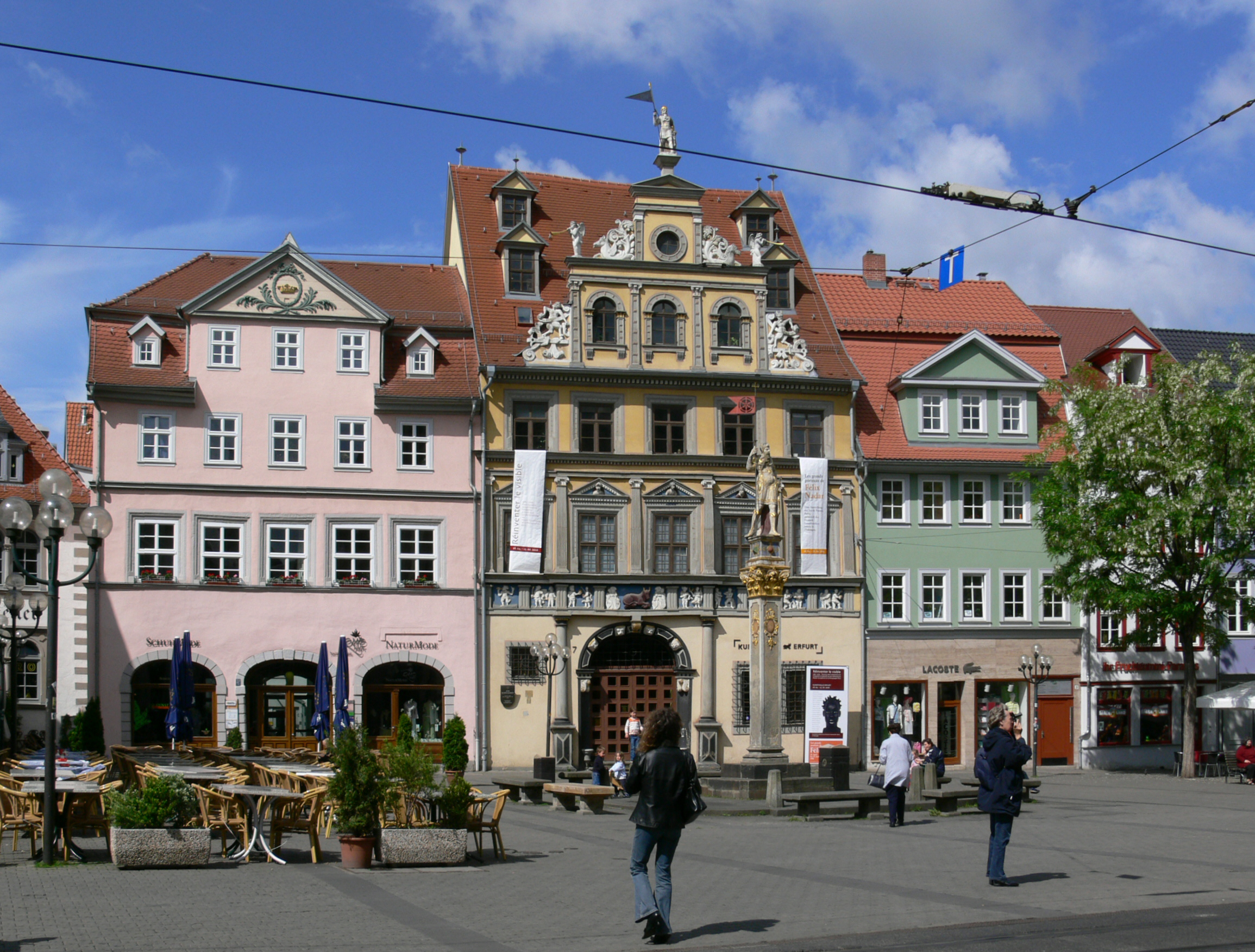
Fischmarkt

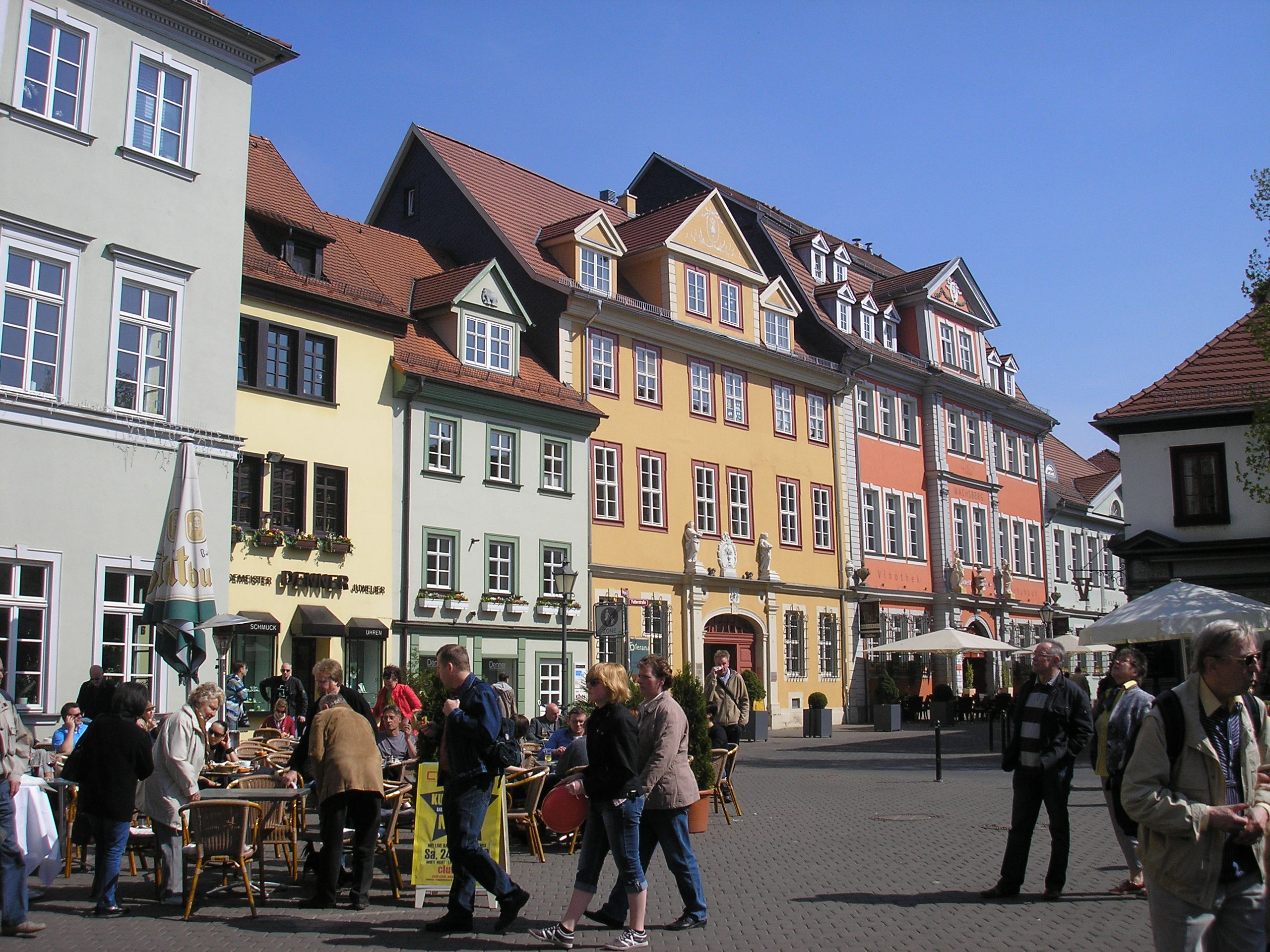
Wenigemarkt

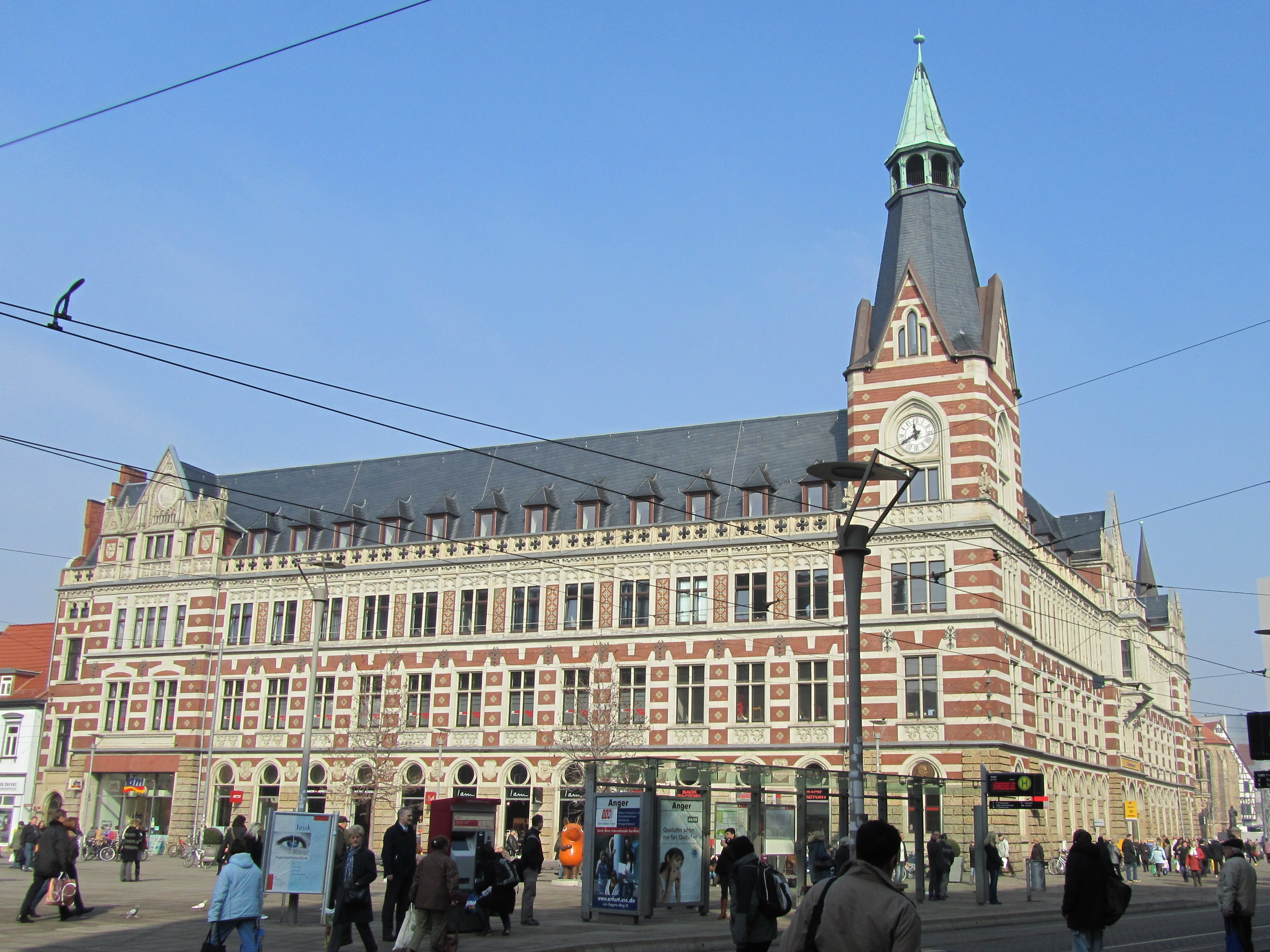
Post office at Anger

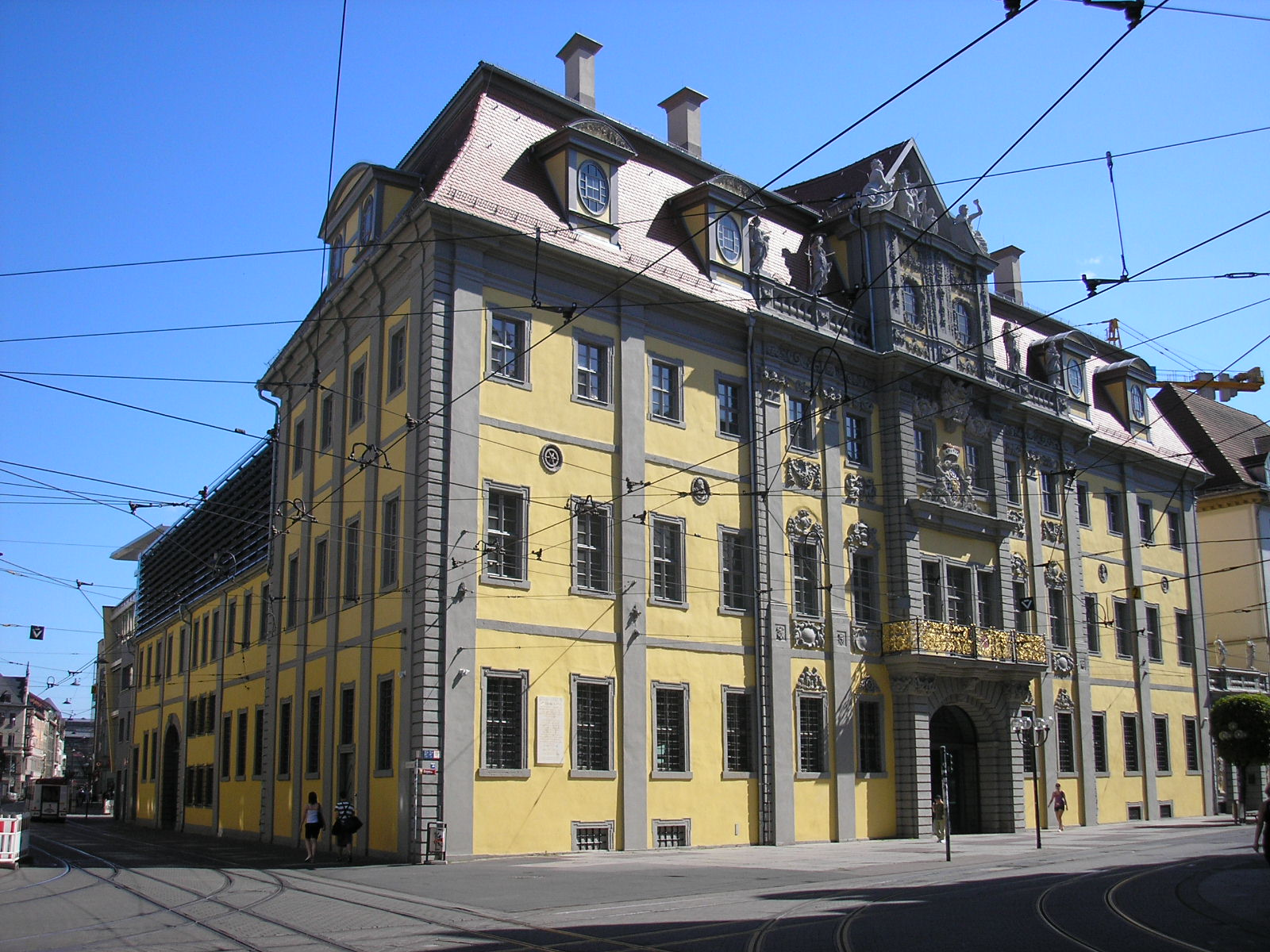
Angermuseum

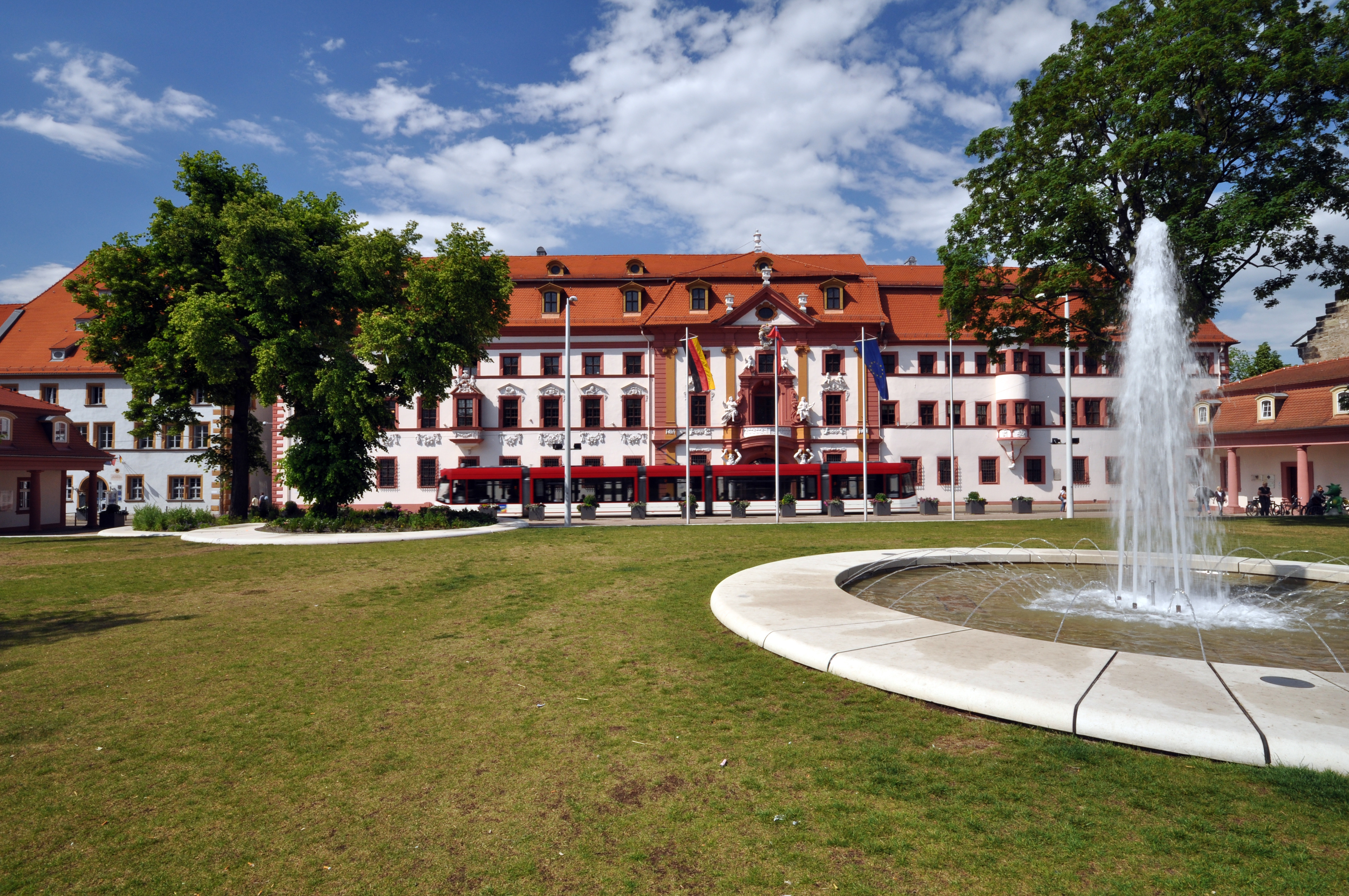
Hirschgarten

===== Fortifications =====
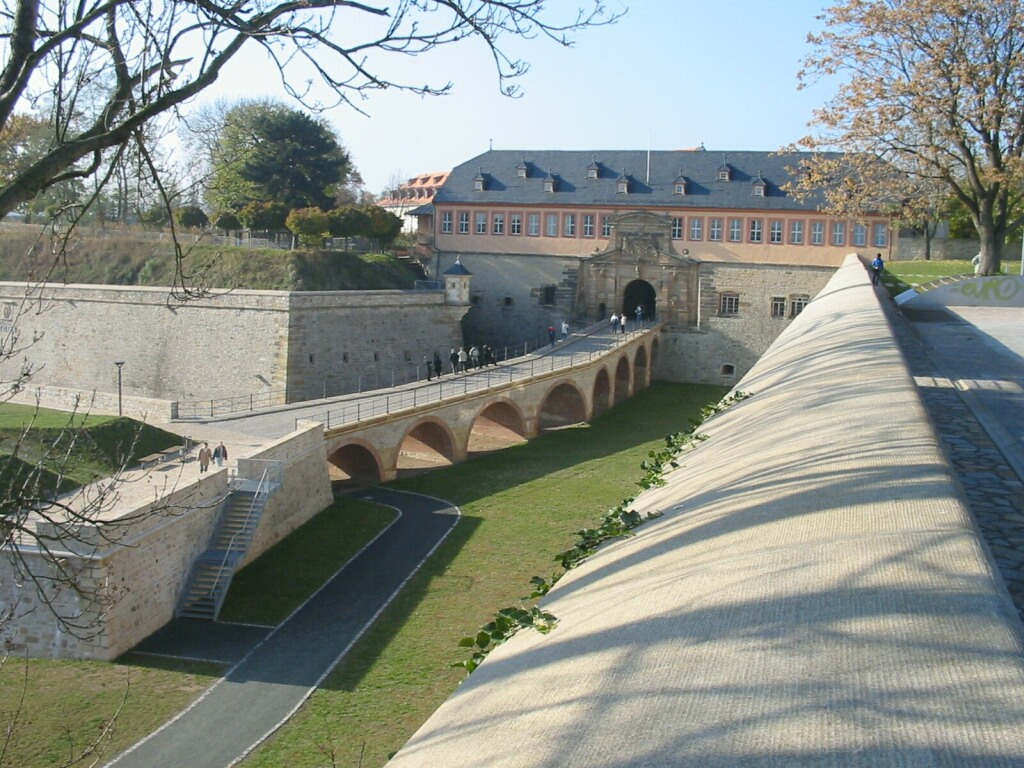
Petersberg Citadel

From 1066 until 1873 the old town of Erfurt was encircled by a fortified wall. About 1168 this was extended to run around the western side of Petersberg hill, enclosing it within the city boundaries.

After German Unification in 1871, Erfurt became part of the newly created German Empire. The threat to the city from its Saxon neighbours and from Bavaria was no longer present, so it was decided to dismantle the city walls. Only a few remnants remain today. A piece of inner wall can be found in a small park at the corner Juri-Gagarin-Ring and Johannesstraße and another piece at the flood ditch (Flutgraben) near Franckestraße. There is also a small restored part of the wall in the Brühler Garten, behind the Catholic orphanage. Only one of the wall's fortified towers was left standing, on Boyneburgufer, but this was destroyed in an air raid in 1944.

The Petersberg Citadel is one of the largest and best preserved city fortresses in Europe, covering an area of 36 hectares in the north-west of the city centre. It was built from 1665 on Petersberg hill and was in military use until 1963. Since 1990, it has been significantly restored and is now open to the public as an historic site.

The Cyriaksburg Citadel is a smaller citadel south-west of the city centre, dating from 1480. Today, it houses the German horticulture museum.

===== 19th- and 20th-century architecture in the outskirts =====
Between 1873 and 1914, a belt of Gründerzeit architecture emerged around the city centre. The mansion district in the south-west around Cyriakstraße, Richard-Breslau-Straße and Hochheimer Straße hosts some interesting Gründerzeit and Art Nouveau buildings.

The "Mühlenviertel" ("mill quarter"), is an area of beautiful Art Nouveau apartment buildings, cobblestone streets and street trees just to the north of the old city, in the vicinity of Nord Park, bordered by the Gera river on its east side. The Schmale Gera stream runs through the area. In the Middle Ages numerous small enterprises using the power of water mills occupied the area, hence the name "Mühlenviertel", with street names such as Waidmühlenweg (woad, or indigo, mill way), Storchmühlenweg (stork mill way) and Papiermühlenweg (paper mill way).

The Bauhaus style is represented by some housing cooperative projects in the east around Flensburger Straße and Dortmunder Straße and in the north around Neuendorfstraße. Lutherkirke Church in Magdeburger Allee (1927), is an Art Deco building.

The former malt factory "Wolff" at Theo-Neubauer-Straße in the east of Erfurt is a large industrial complex built between 1880 and 1939, and in use until 2000. A new use has not been found yet, but the area is sometimes used as a location in movie productions because of its atmosphere.

Examples of Nazi architecture include the buildings of the Landtag (Thuringian parliament) and Thüringenhalle (an event hall) in the south at Arnstädter Straße. While the Landtag building (1930s) represents more of the neo-Roman/fascist style, Thüringenhalle (1940s) is marked by some neo-Germanic Heimatschutz style elements.

The Stalinist early-GDR style is manifested in the main building of the university at Nordhäuser Straße (1953) and the later more international modern GDR style is represented by the horticultural exhibition centre "Egapark" at Gothaer Straße, the Plattenbau housing complexes like Rieth or Johannesplatz and the redevelopment of Löbertor and Krämpfertor area along Juri-Gagarin-Ring in the city centre.

The current international glass and steel architecture is dominant among most larger new buildings like the Federal Labour Court of Germany (1999), the new opera house (2003), the new main station (2007), the university library, the Erfurt Messe (convention centre) and the Gunda Niemann-Stirnemann ice rink.

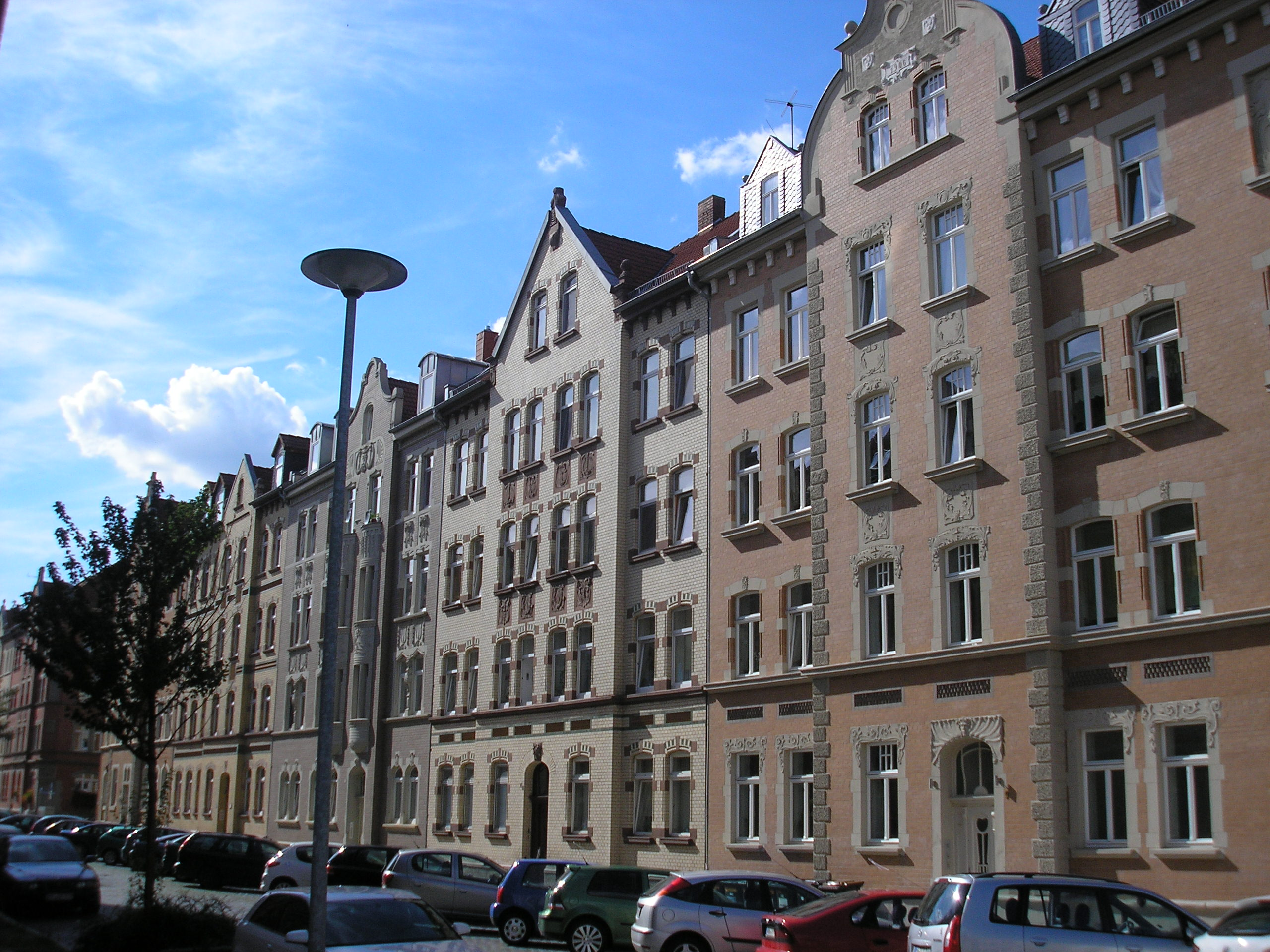
Gründerzeit tenements in Johannesvorstadt district

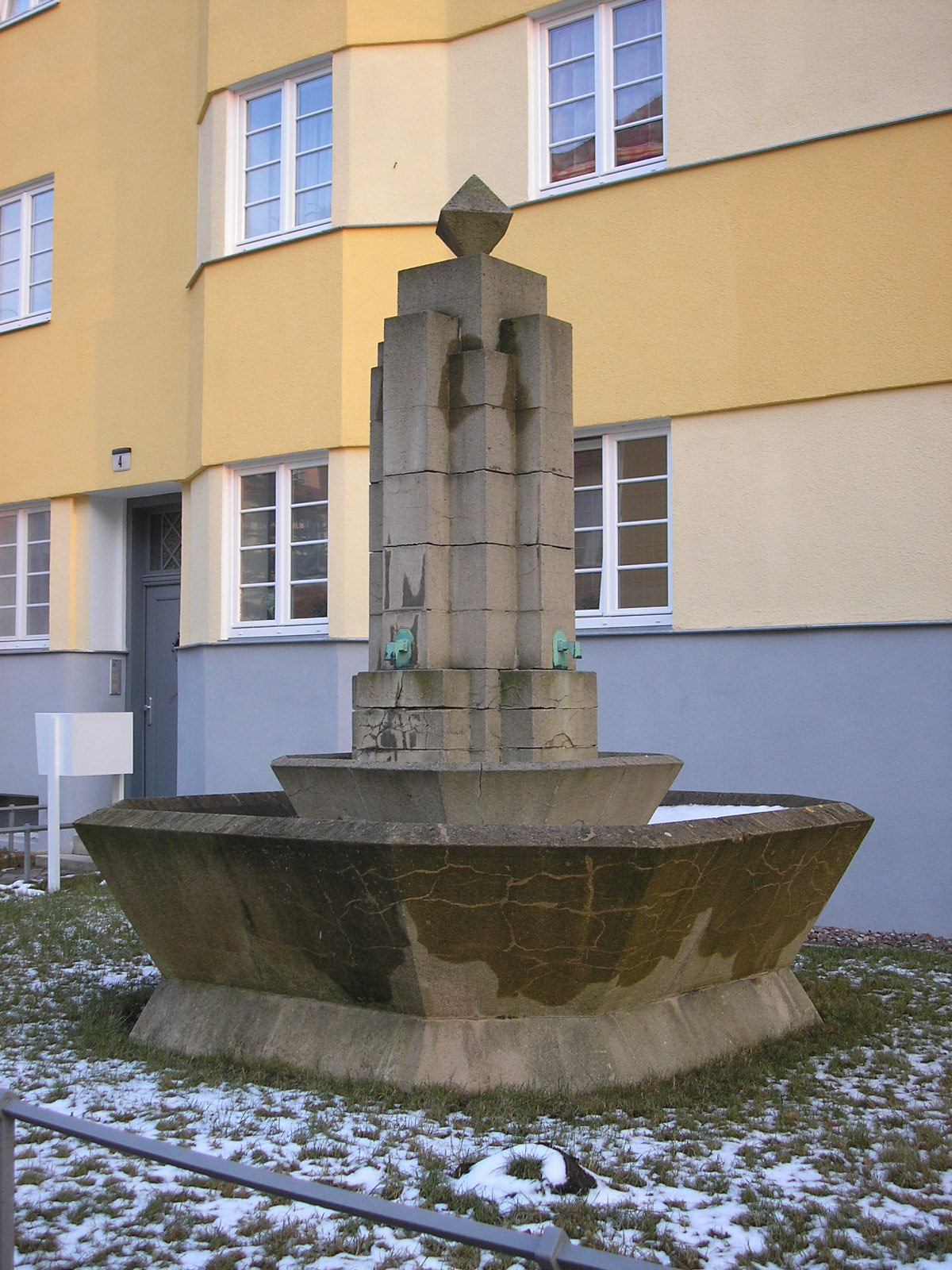
Cubistic fountain in a Bauhaus housing complex

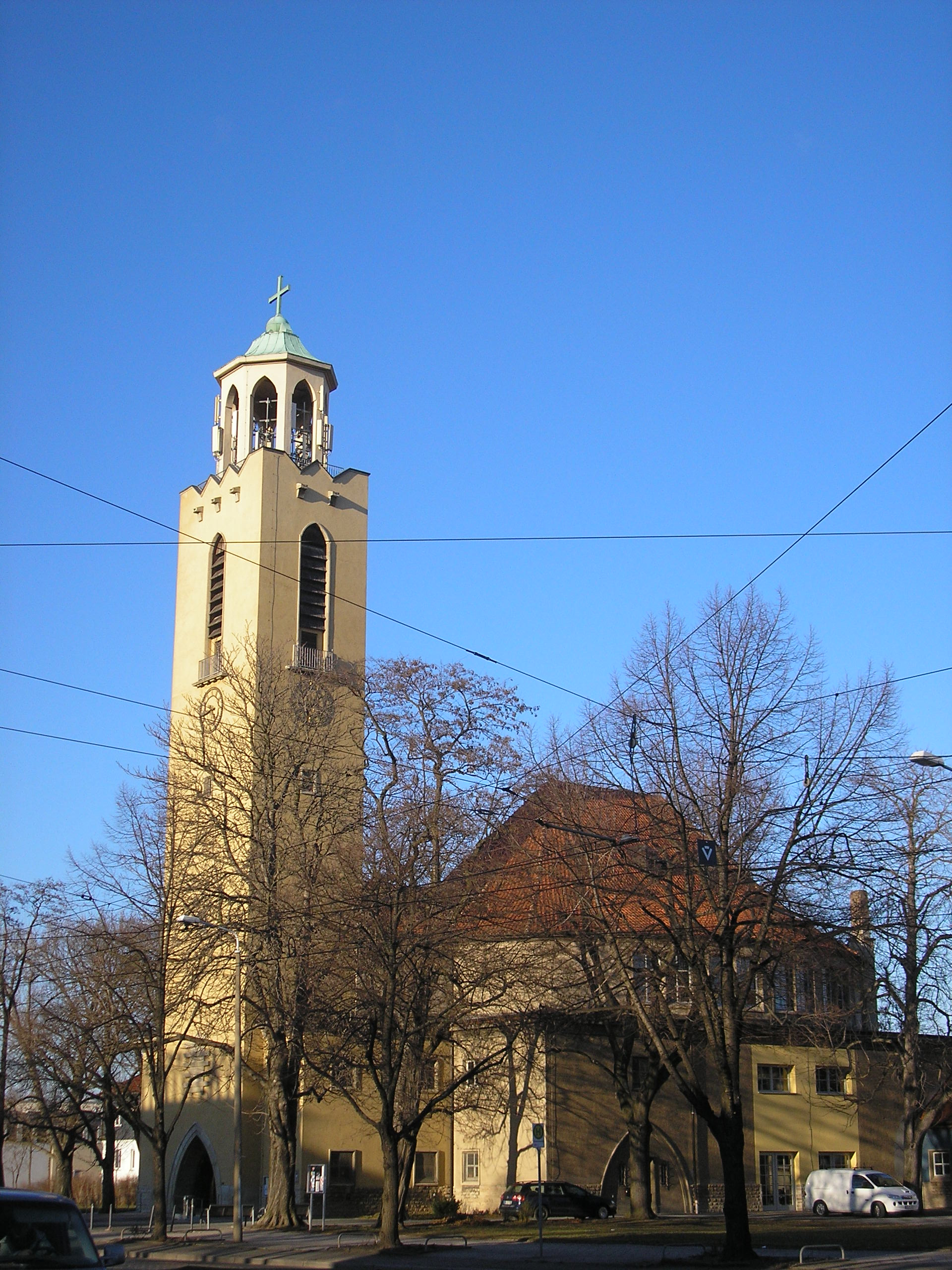
Art Deco Luther's Church

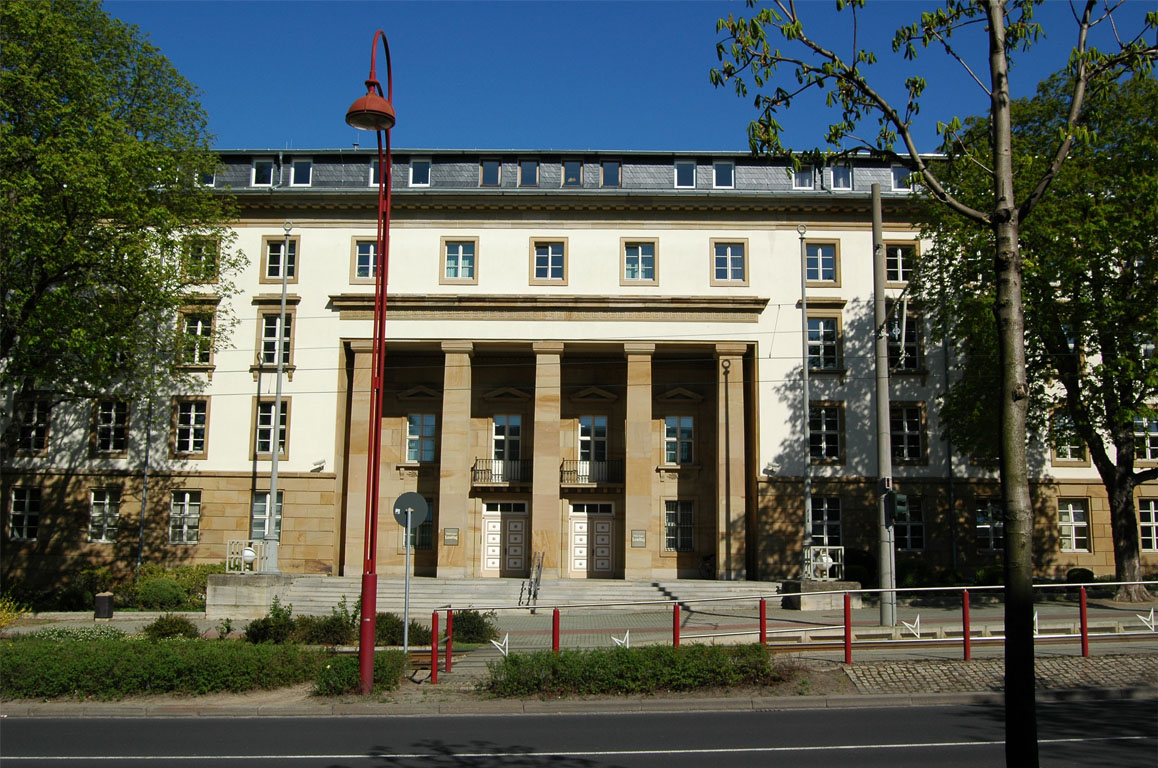
Entrance of the Thuringian parliament

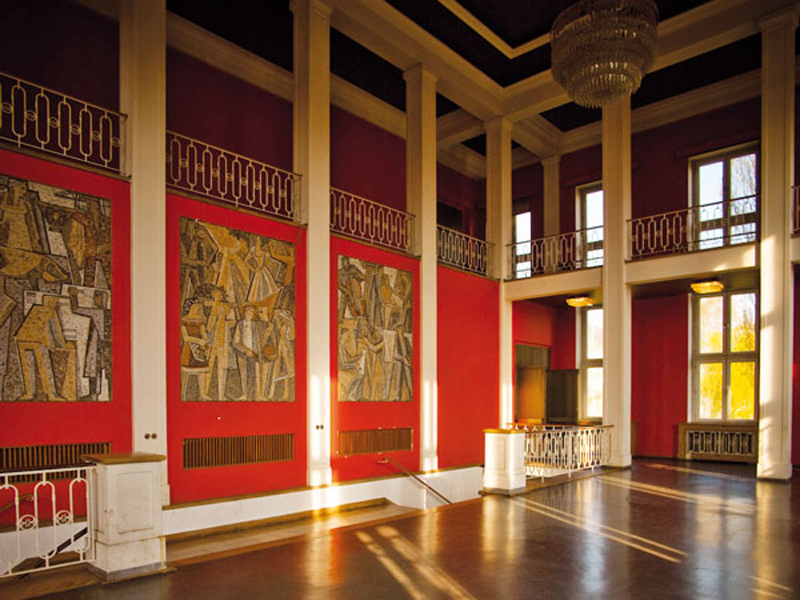
Lobby of the university main building

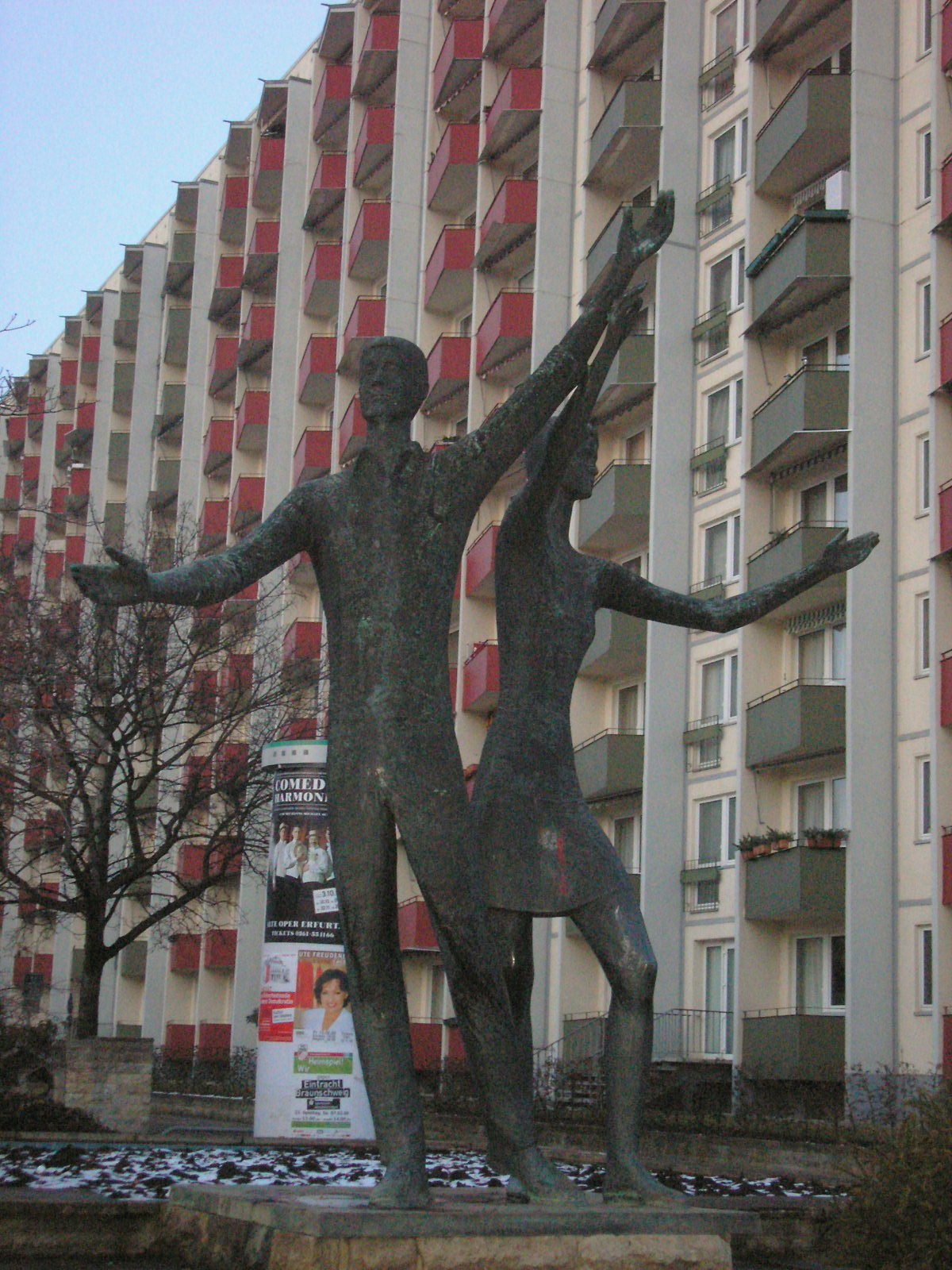
GDR architecture in Johannesplatz district

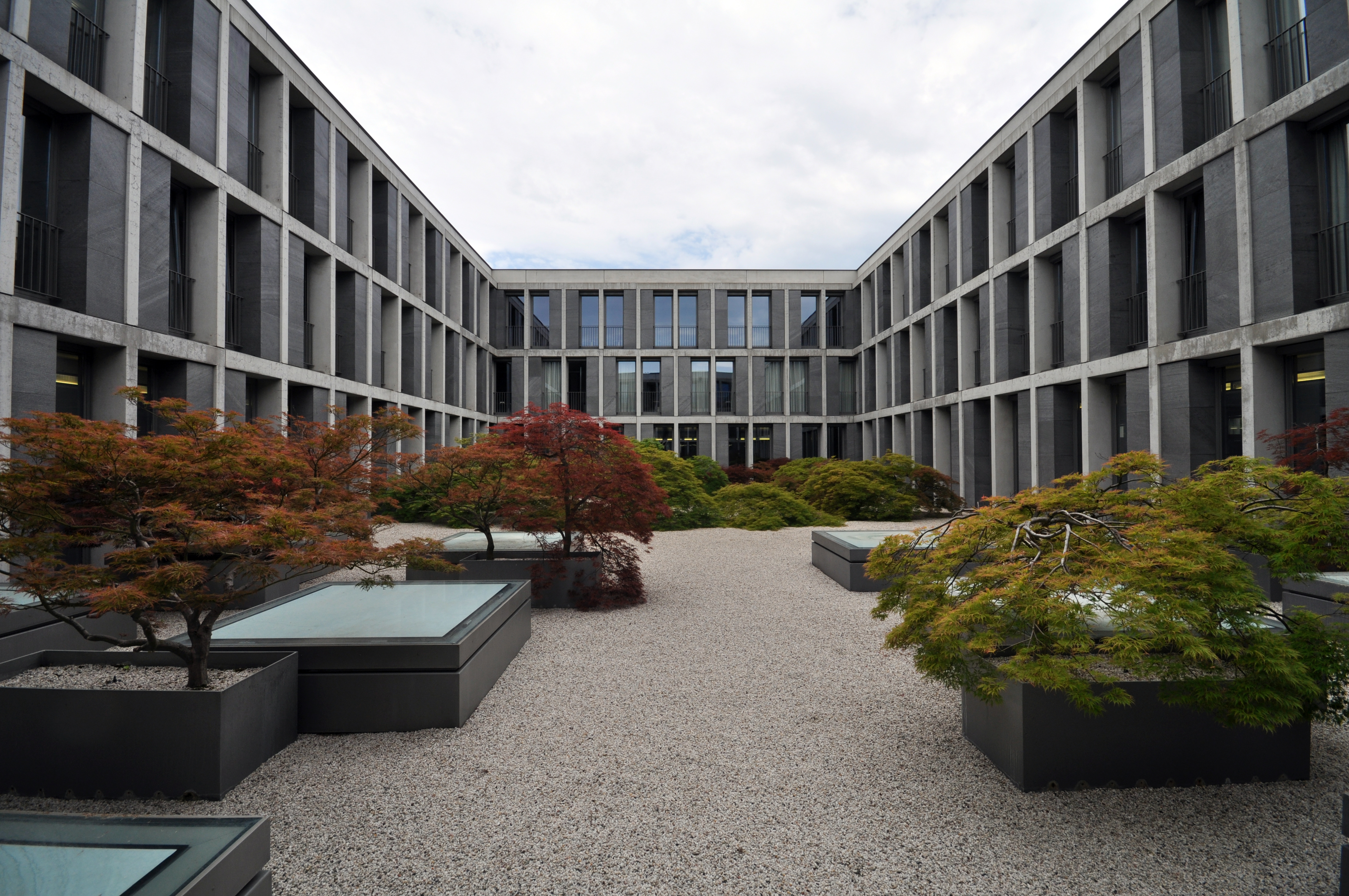
Inner yard of the Federal Labour Court

== Economy and infrastructure ==
During recent years, the economic situation of the city improved: the unemployment rate declined from 21% in 2005 to 9% in 2013. Nevertheless, some 14,000 households with 24,500 persons (12% of population) are dependent upon state social benefits (Hartz IV).

=== Agriculture, industry and services ===
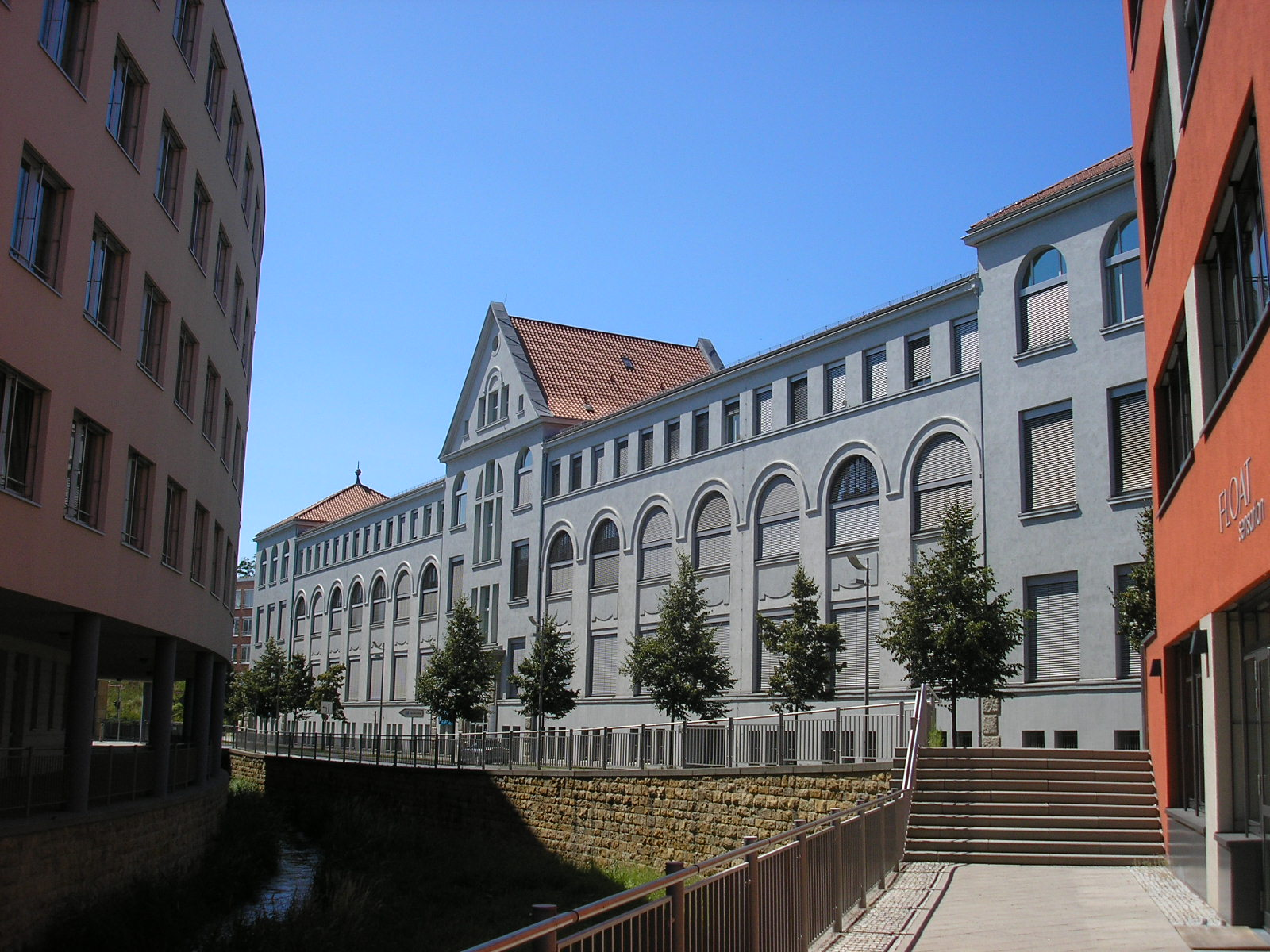
Former factory building, now reused for services

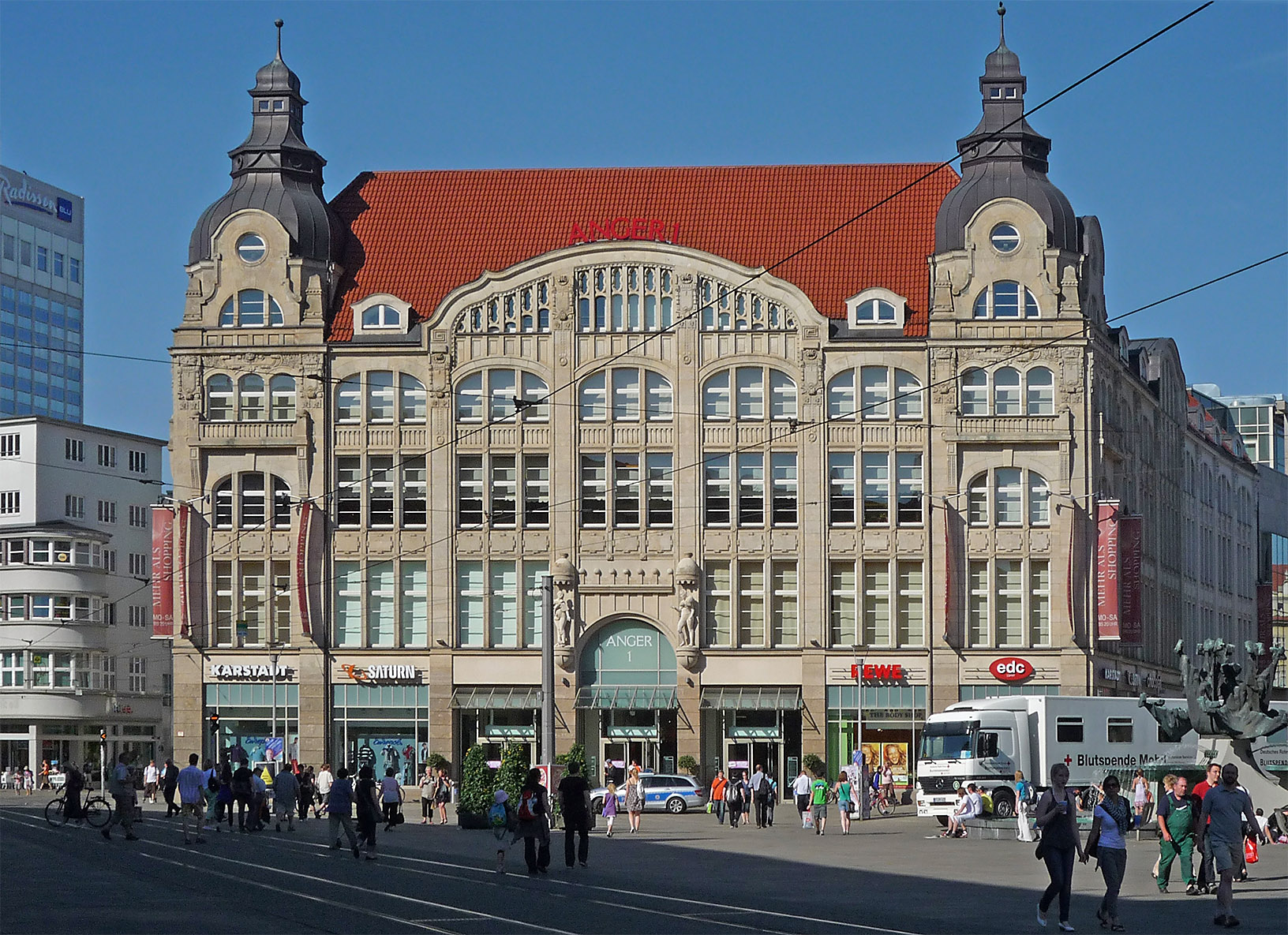
Anger 1, a big department store in centre

Farming has a great tradition in Erfurt: the cultivation of woad made the city rich during the Middle Ages. Today, horticulture and the production of flower seeds is still an important business in Erfurt. There is also growing of fruits (like apples, strawberries and sweet cherries), vegetables (e.g. cauliflowers, potatoes, cabbage and sugar beets) and grain on more than 60% of the municipal territory.

Industrialization in Erfurt started around 1850. Until World War I, many factories were founded in different sectors like engine building, shoes, guns, malt and later electro-technics, so that there was no industrial monoculture in the city. After 1945, the companies were nationalized by the GDR government, which led to the decline of some of them. After reunification, nearly all factories were closed, either because they failed to successfully adopt to a free market economy or because the German government sold them to west German businessmen who closed them to avoid competition to their own enterprises. However, in the early 1990s the federal government started to subsidize the foundation of new companies. It still took a long time before the economic situation stabilized around 2006. Since this time, unemployment has decreased and overall, new jobs were created. Today, there are many small and medium-sized companies in Erfurt with electro-technics, semiconductors and photovoltaics in focus. Engine production, food production, the Braugold brewery, and Born Feinkost, a producer of Thuringian mustard, remain important industries.

Erfurt is an Oberzentrum (which means "supra-centre" according to Central place theory) in German regional planning. Such centres are always hubs of service businesses and public services like hospitals, universities, research, trade fairs, retail etc. Additionally, Erfurt is the capital of the federal state of Thuringia, so that there are many institutions of administration like all the Thuringian state ministries and some nationwide authorities. Typical for Erfurt are the logistic business with many distribution centres of big companies, the Erfurt Trade Fair and the media sector with KiKa and MDR as public broadcast stations. A growing industry is tourism, due to the various historical sights of Erfurt. There are 4,800 hotel beds and (in 2012) 450,000 overnight visitors spent a total of 700,000 nights in hotels. Nevertheless, most tourists are one-day visitors from Germany. The Christmas Market in December attracts some 2,000,000 visitors each year.

=== Transport ===
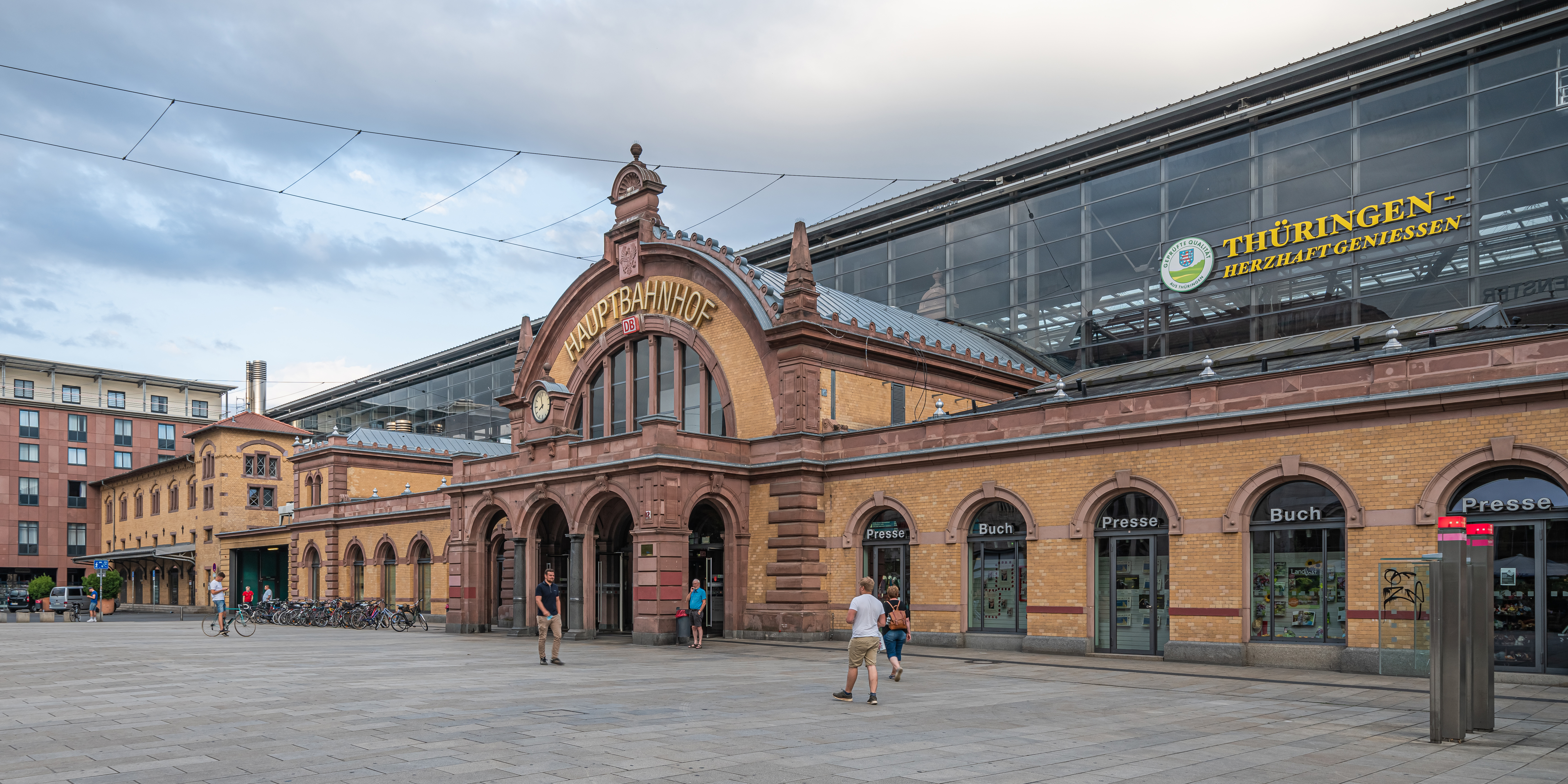
Erfurt Hauptbahnhof, Erfurt's main railway station

==== By rail ====
Flixtrain in Erfurt

The ICE railway network puts Erfurt 1 1/2 hours from Berlin, 2 1/2 hours from Frankfurt, 2 hours from Dresden, and 45 minutes from Leipzig. In 2017, the ICE line to Munich opened, making the trip to Erfurt main station only 2 1/2 hours.

There are regional trains from Erfurt to Weimar, Jena, Gotha, Eisenach, Bad Langensalza, Magdeburg, Nordhausen, Göttingen, Mühlhausen, Würzburg, Meiningen, Ilmenau, Arnstadt, and Gera.

In freight transport there is an intermodal terminal in the district of Vieselbach (Güterverkehrszentrum, GVZ) with connections to rail and the autobahn.

==== By road ====
The two Autobahnen crossing each other nearby at Erfurter Kreuz are the Bundesautobahn 4 (Frankfurt–Dresden) and the Bundesautobahn 71 (Schweinfurt–Sangerhausen). Together with the east tangent both motorways form a circle road around the city and lead the interregional traffic around the centre. Whereas the A 4 was built in the 1930s, the A 71 came into being after the reunification in the 1990s and 2000s. In addition to both motorways there are two Bundesstraßen: the Bundesstraße 7 connects Erfurt parallel to A 4 with Gotha in the west and Weimar in the east. The Bundesstraße 4 is a connection between Erfurt and Nordhausen in the north. Its southern part to Coburg was annulled when A 71 was finished (in this section, the A 71 now effectively serves as B 4). Within the circle road, B 7 and B 4 are also annulled, so that the city government has to pay for maintenance instead of the German federal government. The access to the city is restricted as Umweltzone since 2012 for some vehicles. Large parts of the inner city are a pedestrian area which can not be reached by car (except for residents).

==== By light rail and bus ====
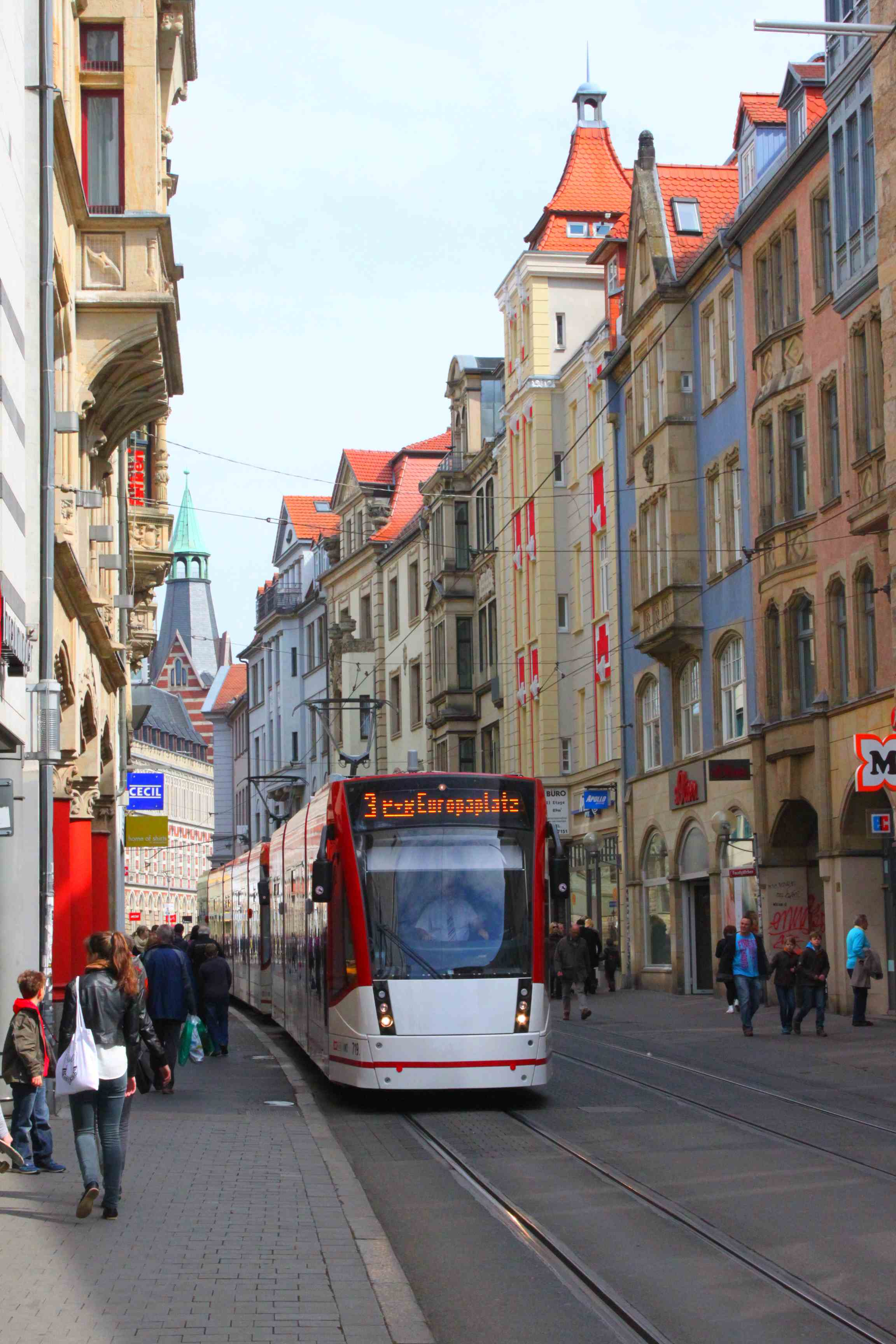
Light rail tram near Anger square

The Erfurt public transport system is marked by the area-wide Erfurt Stadtbahn (light rail) network, established as a tram system in 1883, upgraded to a light rail (Stadtbahn) system in 1997, and continually expanded and upgraded through the 2000s. Today, there are six Stadtbahn lines running every ten minutes on every light rail route.

Additionally, Erfurt operates a bus system, which connects the sparsely populated outer districts of the region to the city center. Both systems are organized by SWE EVAG, a transit company owned by the city administration. The public service, managed by SWE/EVAG, is guaranteed by buses and trams in service from morning until late evening, with a night service starting from midnight until 4AM.

==== By airplane ====
Erfurt-Weimar Airport lies 3 km (2 mi) west of the city centre. It is linked to the central train station via Stadtbahn (tram). It was significantly extended in the 1990s, with flights mostly to Mediterranean holiday destinations and to London during the peak Christmas market tourist season. Connections to longer haul flights are easily accessible via Frankfurt Airport, which can be reached in about 2.5 hours via a direct train from Frankfurt Airport to Erfurt, and from Leipzig/Halle Airport, which can be reached within half an hour.

==== By bike ====
Biking is becoming increasingly popular since construction of high quality cycle tracks began in the 1990s. There are cycle lanes for general commuting within Erfurt city.

Long-distance trails, such as the Gera track and the Radweg Thüringer Städtekette (Thuringian cities trail), connect points of tourist interest. The former runs along the Gera river valley from the Thuringian Forest to the river Unstrut; the latter follows the medieval Via Regia from Eisenach to Altenburg via Gotha, Erfurt, Weimar, and Jena.

The Rennsteig Cycle Way was opened in 2000. This designated high-grade hiking and bike trail runs along the ridge of the Thuringian Central Uplands. The bike trail, about 200 km (124 mi) long, occasionally departs from the course of the historic Rennsteig hiking trail, which dates back to the 1300s, to avoid steep inclines. It is therefore about 30 km (19 mi) longer than the hiking trail.

The Rennsteig is connected to the E3 European long distance path, which goes from the Atlantic coast of Spain to the Black Sea coast of Bulgaria, and the E6 European long distance path, running from Arctic Finland to Turkey.

=== Education ===
After reunification, the educational system was reorganized. The University of Erfurt, founded in 1379 and closed in 1816, was refounded in 1994 with a focus on social sciences, modern languages, humanities and teacher training. Today there are approximately 6,000 students working within four faculties, the Max Weber Center for Advanced Cultural and Social Studies, and three academic research institutes. The university has an international reputation and participates in international student exchange programmes.

The Fachhochschule Erfurt, is a university of applied sciences, founded in 1991, which offers a combination of academic training and practical experience in subjects such as social work and social pedagogy, business studies, and engineering. There are nearly 5,000 students in six faculties, of which the faculty of landscaping and horticulture has a national reputation.

The International University of Applied Sciences Bad Honnef – Bonn (IUBH), is a privately run university with a focus on business and economics. It merged with the former Adam-Ries-Fachhochschule in 2013.

The world renowned Bauhaus design school was founded in 1919 in the city of Weimar, approximately 20 km (12 mi) from Erfurt, 12 minutes by train. The buildings are now part of a World Heritage Site and are today used by the Bauhaus-Universität Weimar, which teaches design, arts, media and technology-related subjects.

Higher secondary education is provided at eight Gymnasien, of which six are state-owned, one is Catholic (Edith-Stein-Schule) and one Protestant (Evangelisches Ratsgymnasium Erfurt). Among the state-owned schools are a Sportgymnasium, a boarding school for students highly talented in athletics, swimming, ice skating or football, and the Albert-Schweitzer-Gymnasium featuring boarding-school classes with additional focus on mathematics, natural sciences and computer science, in addition to the common curriculum.

=== Media ===
The German national public television children's channel KiKA is based in Erfurt.

The Mitteldeutscher Rundfunk (MDR), a public radio and television broadcaster, has a centre in Erfurt.

The Thüringer Allgemeine is a Thuringian local newspaper that is headquartered in the city.

== Politics ==
=== Mayor and city council ===
The first freely elected mayor after German reunification was Manfred Ruge of the Christian Democratic Union, who served from 1990 to 2006. From 2006 to 2024, Andreas Bausewein of the Social Democratic Party (SPD) was mayor. Andreas Horn (CDU) was elected in 2024. The most recent mayoral election was held on 26 May 2024, with a runoff held on 9 June, and the results were as follows:

Candidate	Party	First round		Second round	
Candidate	Party	Votes	%	Votes	%
Andreas Horn	Christian Democratic Union	28,224	28.4	59,913	64.2
Andreas Bausewein	Social Democratic Party	22,563	22.7	33,433	35.8
Stefan Möller	Alternative for Germany	19,275	19.4		
Matthias Bärwolff	The Left	12,742	12.8		
Jana Rötsch	Better City Erfurt	12,447	12.5		
David Maicher	Alliance 90/The Greens	4,098	4.1		
Valid votes		99,349	98.8	93,346	95.9
Invalid votes		1,196	1.2	3,831	4.1
Total		100,545	100.0	97,177	100.0
Electorate/voter turnout		169,899	59.2	169,569	57.3

The most recent city council election was held on 9 June 2024, and the results were as follows:

Party	Lead candidate	Votes	%	+/-	Seats	+/-
Christian Democratic Union (CDU)	Andreas Horn	71,551	24.8	▲5.2	12	▲2
Alternative for Germany (AfD)	Stefan Möller	58,911	20.4	▲5.5	10	▲3
Social Democratic Party (SPD)	Andreas Bausewein	46,834	16.2	▼0.9	8	▼1
The Left (Die Linke)	Matthias Bärwolff	42,733	14.8	▼1.7	8	0
Better City Erfurt (M)	Jana Rötsch	29,098	10.1	▲2.8	4	▲1
Alliance 90/The Greens (Grüne)	Laura Wahl	21,721	7.5	▼4.3	4	▼2
Free Democratic Party (FDP)	Stefanie Hantke	7,296	2.5	▼2.9	1	▼2
Free Voters (FW)	Peter Stampf	6,111	2.1	▼2.9	1	▼1
Pirate Party/ÖDP (Piraten/ÖDP)	Peter Städter	4,831	1.9	▼0.2	1	0
Valid votes		289,086	100.0			
Total ballots		100,530	100.0		50	±0
Electorate/voter turnout		169,887	59.2	▲0.8		
Source: Wahlen in Thüringen Archived 7 October 2024 at the Wayback Machine

== Twin towns – sister cities ==
Erfurt is twinned with:

- Győr, Hungary (1971)
- Vilnius, Lithuania (1972)
- Kalisz, Poland (1982)
- Mainz, Germany (1988)
- Lille, France (1991)
- Shawnee, United States (1993)
- San Miguel de Tucumán, Argentina (1993)
- Lovech, Bulgaria (1996)
- Haifa, Israel (2000)
- Xuzhou, China (2005)
- Kati, Mali (2011)

== Notable people ==
- See: List of people from Erfurt
