= Schottenkirche, Erfurt =

Church building in Thuringia, Germany

Schottenkirche
- German: St. Nicolai und Jacobi
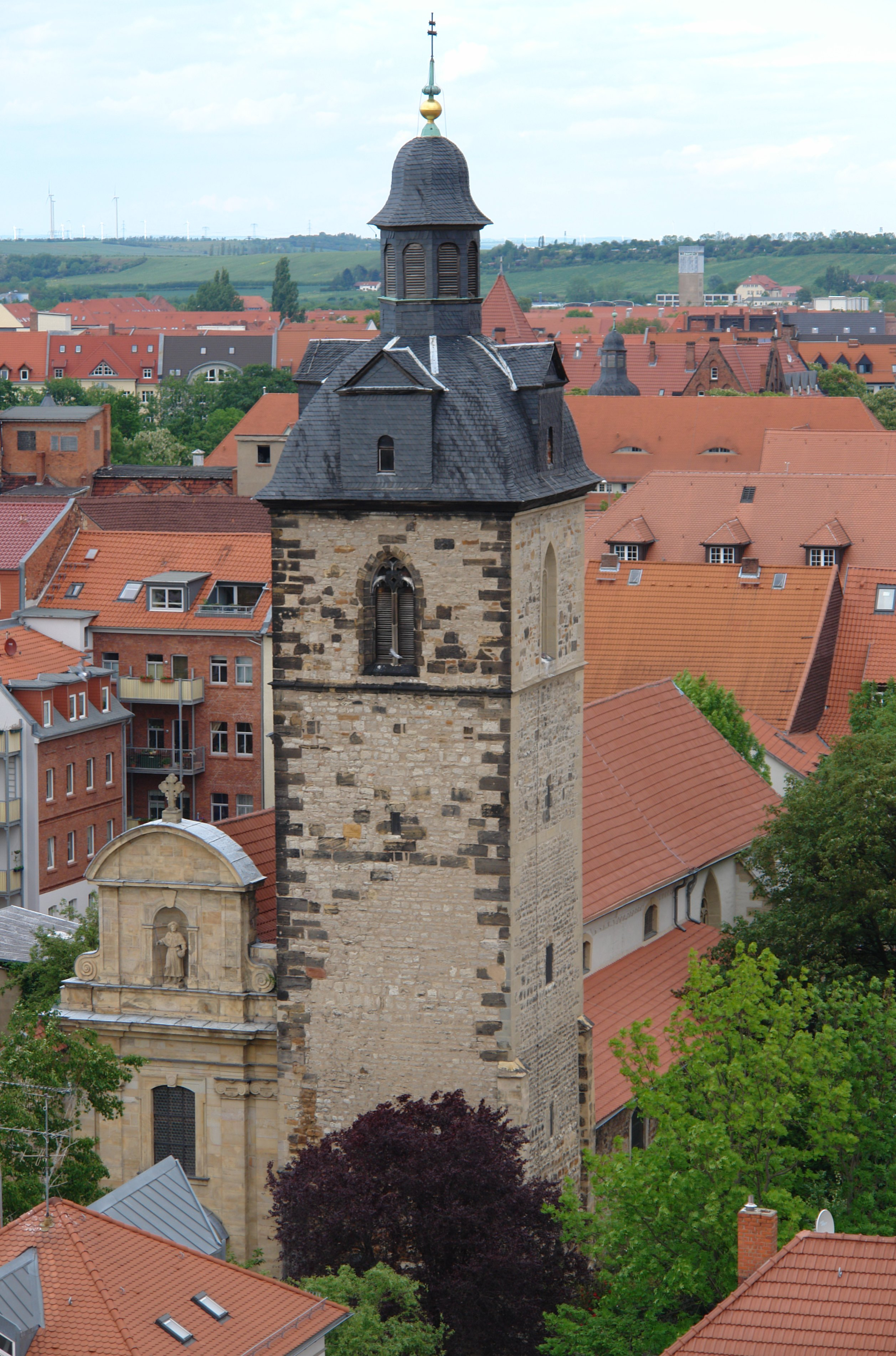

- Location in Germany
- 50°58′47″N 11°01′58″E
- Location: Erfurt, Thuringia
- Country: Germany
- Denomination: Catholic
- Website: st-laurentius-erfurt.de

History
- Status: Subsidiary church
- Dedication: Saint Nicholas and Saint James

Architecture
- Heritage designation: Kulturdenkmal in Thuringia
- Style: Romanesque, Gothic, Baroque

Administration
- Diocese: Diocese of Erfurt

The Schottenkirche (pronounced [ˈʃɔtn̩ˌkɪʁçə], 'Scots' Church'; also St. Nicolai und Jacobi 'St Nicholas' and James') in the historical part of the city of Erfurt in Thuringia, Germany, is a Roman Catholic church building dating back to the 12th century. The Romanesque basilica belonged to a former Celtic monastery of St James. Today, it is a subsidiary church of the Catholic parish of St Lawrence's Church.

== History ==
The three-aisled basilica is Romanesque in origin and partly Gothic in style. The Benedictine monastery was founded in 1136 by the brother of the Naumburg bishop Hildeward, Walther von Glisberg, whose gravestone is on display in the church. It shows the imperial ministerial, who was propertied at the Kunitzburg in Jena, and his wife in the style of Romanesque depictions of persons. He was also Vogt of his foundation. The monastery was a branch monastery of the Abbey of St James in Regensburg, founded by Marianus Scottus, from which the present name Schottenkirche is derived (Schotten is German for "Scots"). By 1200, the building work was completed and the monastery church finished. In the early 13th century, the western nave bay was replaced by Early Gothic arcades. First in 1299, then again in 1472, the great Erfurt city fire destroyed parts of the church, which were subsequently rebuilt in Gothic forms, reusing some of the old stones which are still distinguishable today. Various architectural and decorative elements refer to the Iro-Scottish origin. The choir shows Gothic forms from the time after the second church fire in 1472.

In the 18th century, due to emerging defects in the rising masonry, the solid vault was replaced by a wooden false vault. The window openings in the clerestory and in the side aisles, which enlarged the Romanesque round-arched windows, date from the same period. The most conspicuous sign from the time of reconstruction is the Late Gothic choir room with the sacristy. The church tower received its canopy in the Baroque period. The Baroque west façade was added from 1720 to 1729. Since 1744, the church belonged to St Nicholas' congregation as a parish church. The monastery buildings were demolished in 1820.

In 1956, the Baroque galleries were removed from the church again and the floor was lowered to the original 12th-century level. Due to the constant rise in the level of the ground, which is typical of old cities, it is about one metre (3 ft 3 in) below the outer floor after 900 years, so that there are a few steps leading down into the church at the entrance. From 1963, the Schottenkirche was fundamentally renovated and in 1964, it was re-consecrated. In 1971, it was given a uniform design similar to Erfurt Cathedral with new glazing by Charles Crodel. Since 2005, it is a subsidiary church of the Catholic parish of St Lawrence.

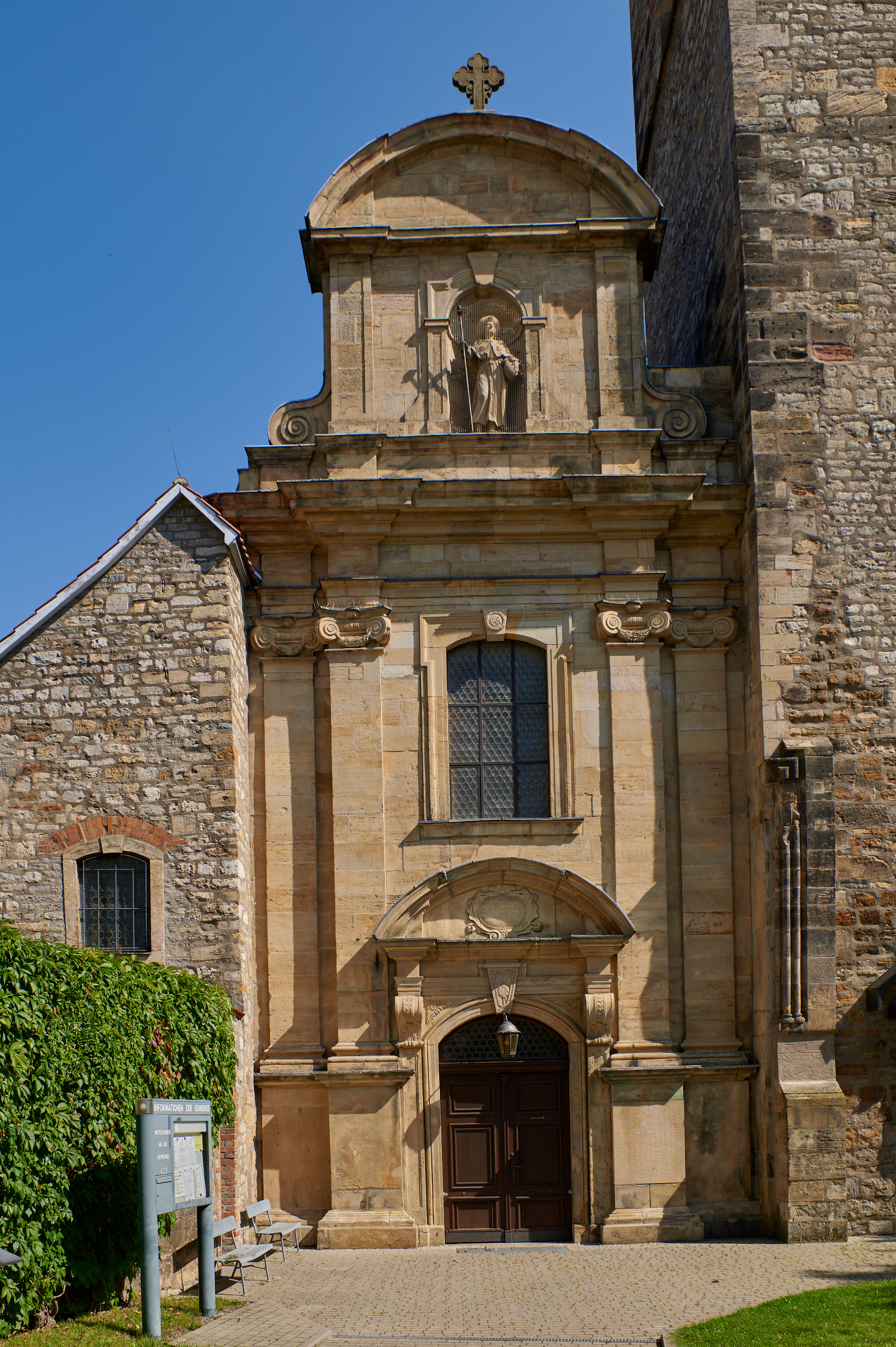
The Baroque west façade

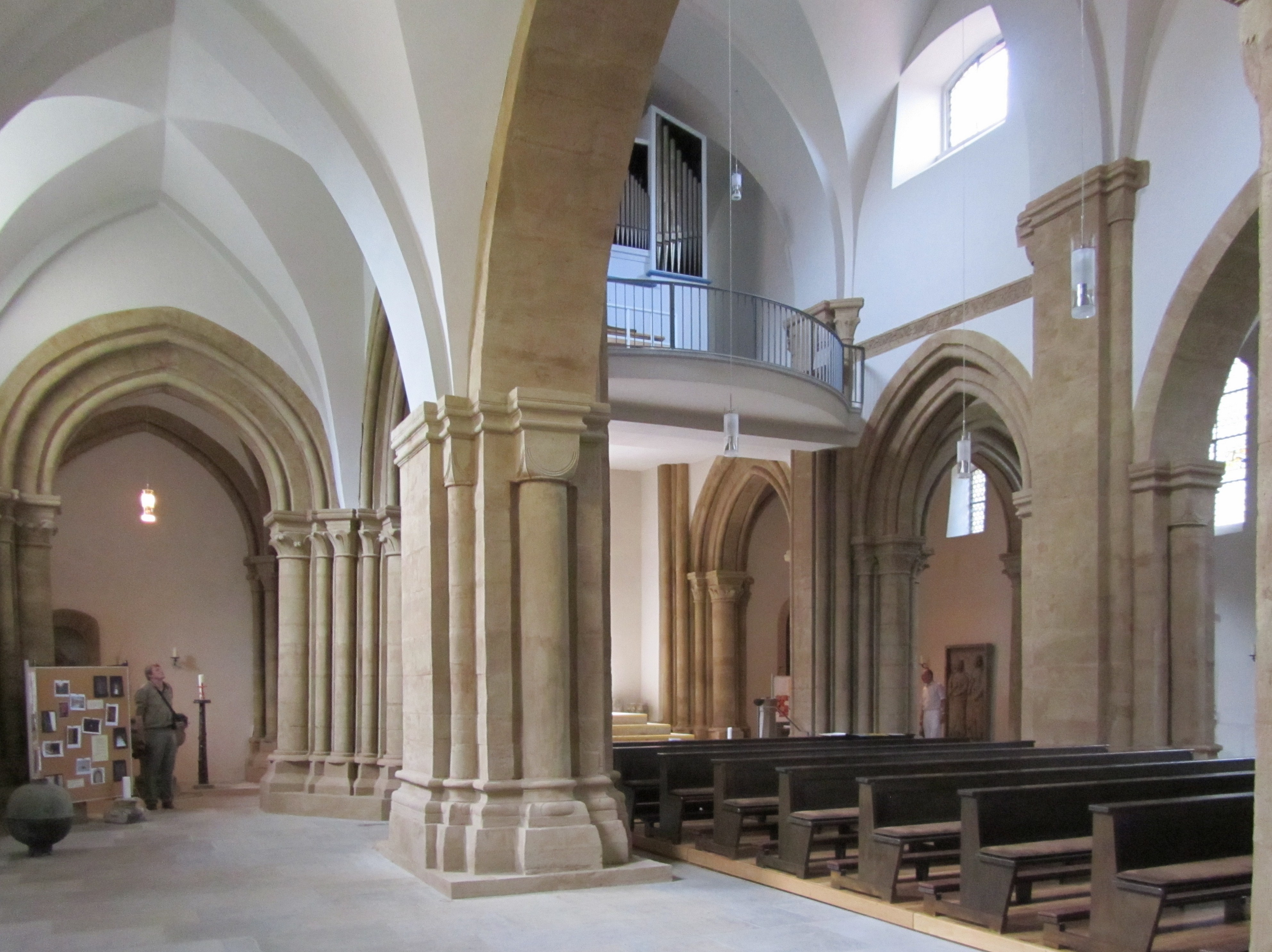
Interior view

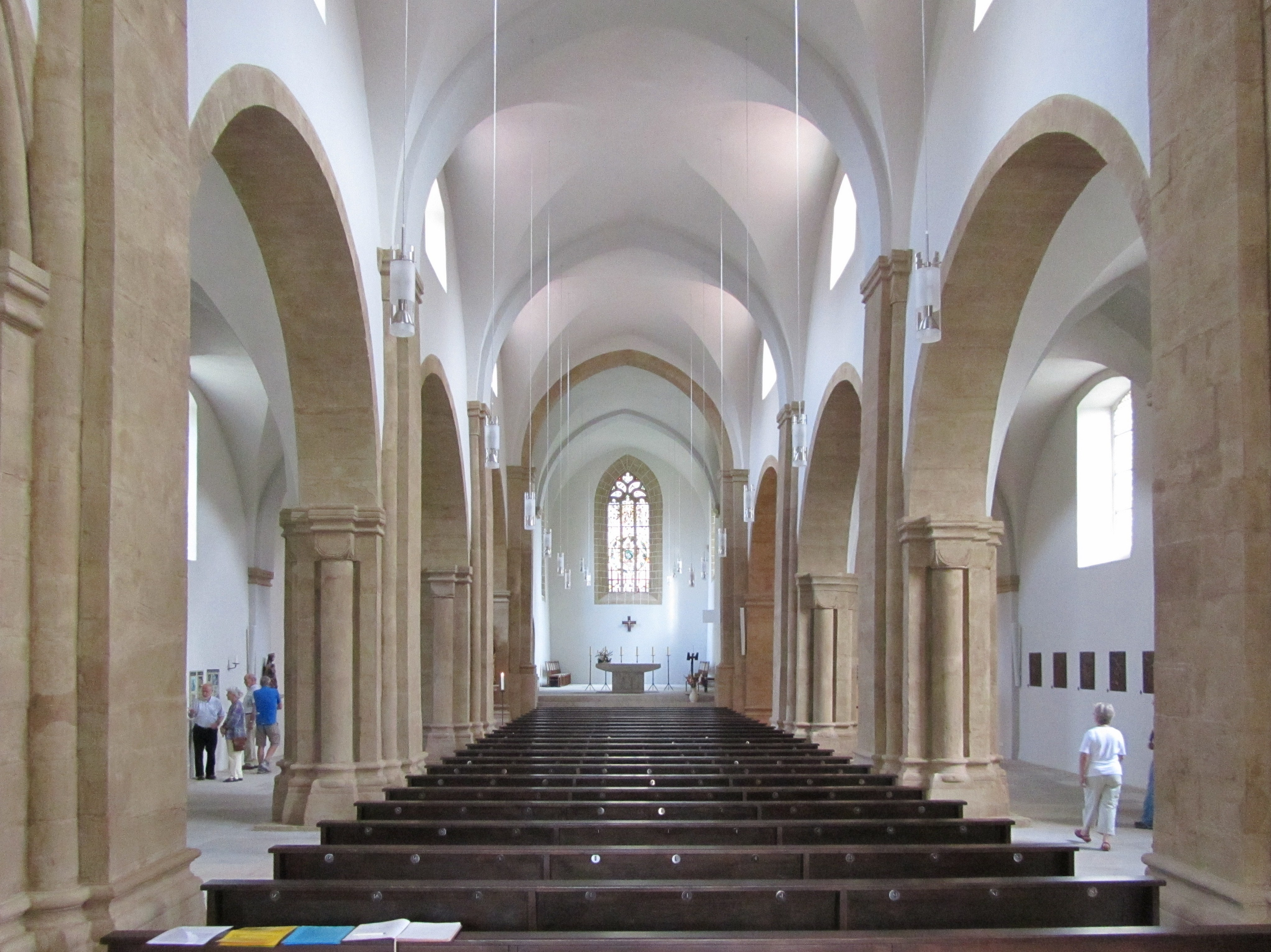
Interior view

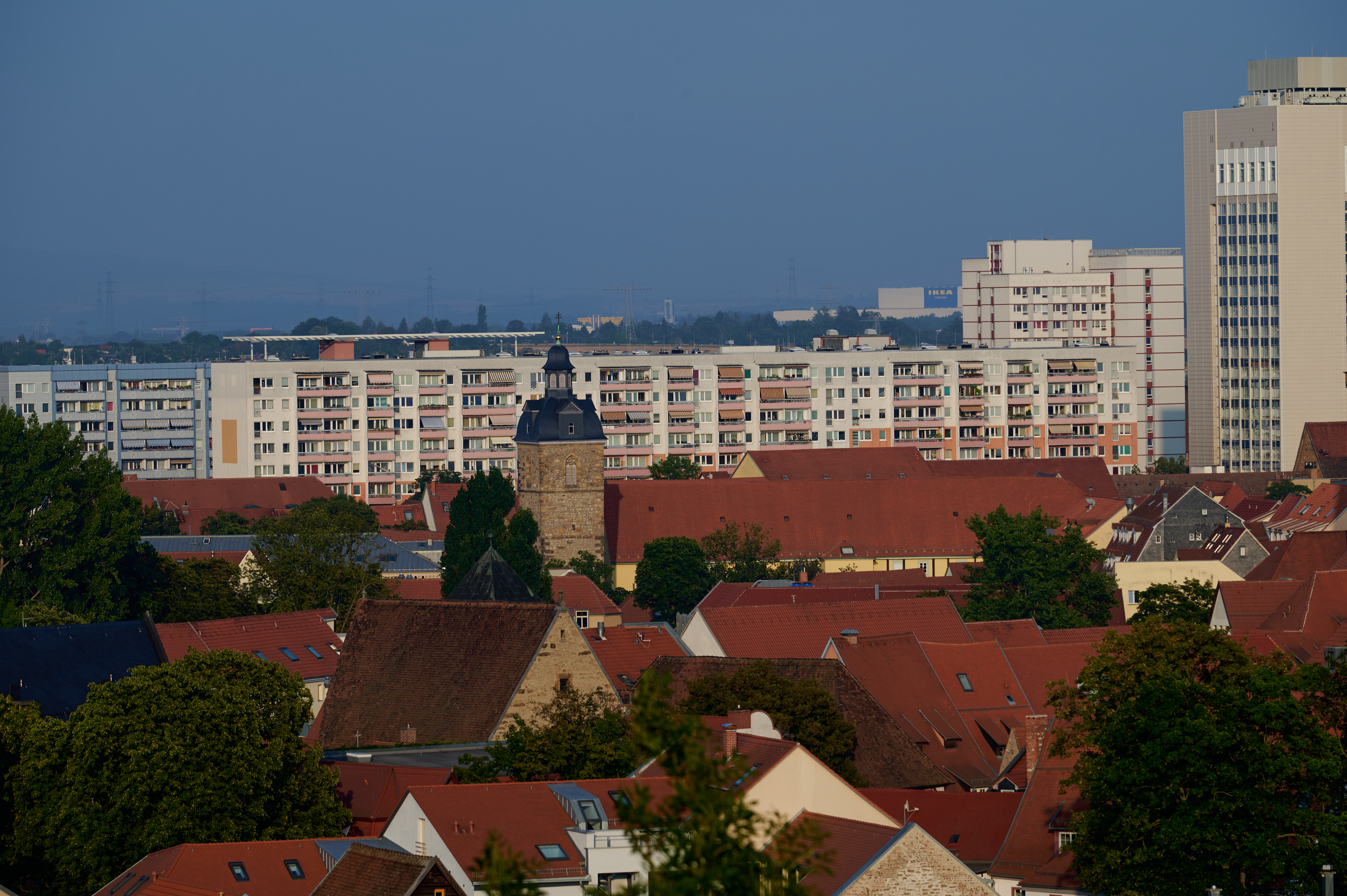
View from Petersberg

== Bibliography ==
- Dehio, Georg (2003). Handbuch der deutschen Kunstdenkmäler. Thüringen (in German). München: Deutscher Kunstverlag. ISBN 3-422-03095-6.
- Flachenecker, Helmut (1995). Schottenklöster. Irische Benediktinerkonvente im hochmittelalterlichen Deutschland. Quellen und Forschungen aus dem Gebiet der Geschichte, Neue Serie (in German). Vol. 18. Paderborn: Schöningh. ISBN 3-506-73268-4.
- Scholle, Joseph (1932). Das Erfurter Schottenkloster (in German). Düsseldorf: L. Schwann.
- Schöneburg, Gerd (2007). Kirchen im Erfurter Gebiet (in German). Erfurt: Self-published. DNB-IDN 1007966424.
- Weber, Stefan (2010). Iren auf dem Kontinent. Das Leben des Marianus Scottus von Regensburg und die Anfänge der irischen Schottenklöster (in German). Heidelberg: Mattes. ISBN 978-3-86809-034-5.
- Schellenberg, Kai-Uwe. "Die Schottenkirche (= Was steht in Erfurt unter Denkmalschutz?)". Stadt und Geschichte. Zeitschrift für Erfurt (82 (2023)): 36.
