= St Martin's Church, Erfurt =

St Martin's Church
- German: St. Martini
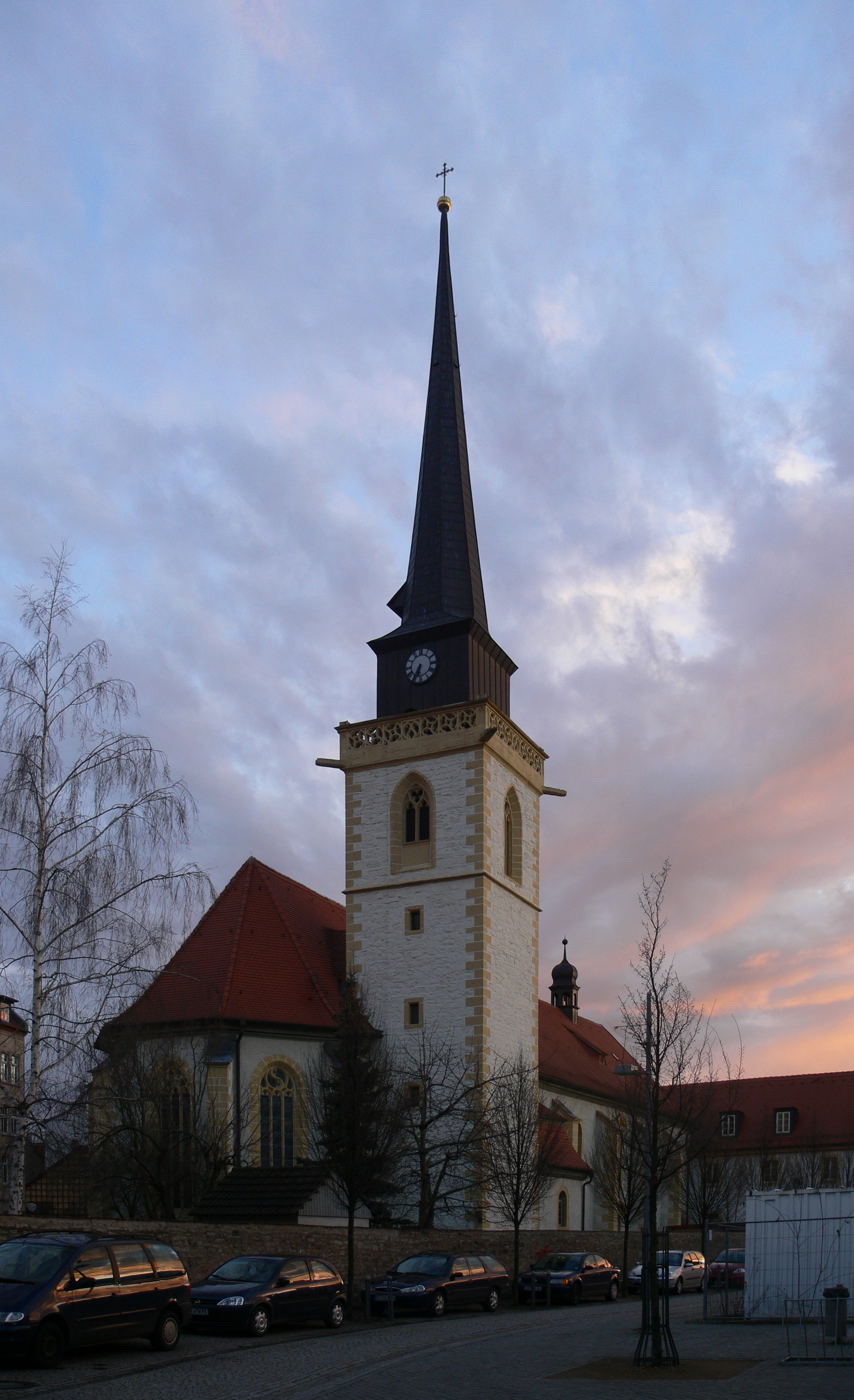

- 50°58′24.38″N 11°01′02.14″E
- Location: Erfurt, Thuringia
- Address: Brühler Straße 55; 99094
- Country: Germany
- Denomination: Roman Catholic
- Website: st-laurentius-erfurt.de

History
- Status: Subsidiary church
- Dedication: Martin of Tours
- Consecrated: 6 August 1758

Architecture
- Heritage designation: Kulturdenkmal in Thuringia
- Style: Gothic, Baroque
- Years built: 1472–83 (basis); 1755–58 (modified)

Administration
- Diocese: Diocese of Erfurt

St Martin's Church (German: St. Martini) in the west of the historical centre of the city of Erfurt in Thuringia, Germany, is a Roman Catholic church building. Today, it is a subsidiary church of the Catholic parish of St Lawrence's.

== History ==
In 1265, St Martin's Church was first mentioned in a document as a parish church, although it is suspected that there already existed a church on the present site in the eleventh century. Franciscan friars, who maintained a hospital in the Brühl quarter of Erfurt in the 13th century, presumably used St Martin's as a hospital church. However, there is no evidence to support this assumption.

From 1311 (or 1303), St Martin's had been not only a parish church for more than 500 years, but also served as a nunnery church for the Cistercian convent named Mariengarten ("Mary's Garden") adjoining the church. From the dissolution of the nunnery in 1819 until today, the church has been the place of worship for the Catholic parish of St. Martini.

The oldest surviving part of the church is the Gothic tower, in which St Martin's bell from 1419 still rings today. In 1472, the church – except for the tower – and convent were destroyed by fire. Visible evidence of the new building erected by 1483 are the Gothic windows in the choir, the original sacristy entrance and the sacrament house.

The four-winged two-storey cloister on the west side of the church is also of Gothic origin. It was fundamentally rebuilt between 1726 and 1736. After secularisation, it was converted into Prussian military barracks between 1818 and 1819. At the south-east corner is a Baroque sandstone sculpture of Mary with Child.

During the Thirty Years' War, the church and convent were plundered and the Cistercian nuns were expelled. In 1635, the nuns returned to the convent, but due to a lack of money they were only able to carry out makeshift repairs to the convent and church. The convent was not comprehensively restored until 1726 to 1736. Due to a donation by the suffragan bishop Johann Friedrich von Lasser, the Baroque reconstruction of the church could be carried out in 1755–58. On 6 August 1758, the church was consecrated by the donor himself. Despite several modifications in the 19th century, the church has retained its Baroque appearance to this day. The interior, however, has a Rococo character. The church owns important sacred works of art from both the 15th and 17th centuries. The barrel vault, the portals, the windows in the nave, the image of the Annunciation of Mary, the Stations of the Cross skirting the side walls, and especially the pulpit as well as the magnificent high altar are reminders of the craftsmanship of their creators.

The last restoration work on the church and its interior took place in 2001 to 2002. Besides the church, the adjacent former nunnery, which now houses private flats, has also been restored, so that the church and the nunnery once again form a single unit, at least externally.

== Interior ==
=== Organs ===
There are two pipe organs in St Martin's Church: the main organ on the west gallery and a small organ in the choir.

==== Main organ ====
The main organ was built by the Adam Eifert company from Stadtilm in 1874; in 1995, the instrument was restored. It has 19 stops on two manuals and pedal; the key and stop actions are mechanical. Its stop list is as follows:

I Manual C–f^{3}
1.	Bordun	16′
2.	Principal	8′
3.	Viola di Gamba	8′
4.	Gedackt	8′
5.	Hohlflöte	8′
6.	Octave	4′
7.	Gedackt	4′
8.	Quinte	2 2/3′
9.	Octave	2′
10.	Mixtur IV	1 1/3′

II Manual C–f^{3}
11.	Lieblich Gedackt	8′
12.	Salicional	8′
13.	Geigenprincipal	4′
14.	Flauto Dolce	4′
15.	Cornett I-III	2′

Pedal C–d^{1}
16.	Violon	16′
17.	Subbaß	16′
18.	Octavbaß	8′
19.	Posaune	16′

- Couplers: II/I, I/P

==== Choir organ ====
Since 2010, the choir of the church has had a new organ from the Kutter workshop with mechanical stop and key action, and 5 stops on one manual and pedal. The stop list is as follows:

Manual C–f^{3}
1.	Gedackt	8′
2.	Dulciana	8′
3.	Principal	4′
4.	Rohrflöte	4′
5.	Gemshorn	2′
	Tremulant

Pedal C–d^{1}
6.	Subbass (Note: is obtained from Gedackt 8′ by pickup with microphones and frequency halving.)	16′

=== Bells ===
Two old bells from 1419 and 1590 hang still in the tower. The bell cast in 1419 has rare bell carvings of art-historical significance, which are acknowledged in a publication by art historian Ingrid Schulze.

== Bibliography ==
- Hubel, Achim; Eißing, Stephanie (1998). Handbuch der Deutschen Kunstdenkmäler: Thüringen (in German). Berlin: Deutscher Kunstverlag. p. 332. ISBN 3-422-03050-6.
- Simon, Ulrich (2011). Jürgensmeier, Friedhelm; Schwerdtfeger, Regina E. (eds.). Erfurt, St. Martini extra muros. Germania Benedictina. St. Ottilien. pp. 677–705.
