= St Wigbert's Church, Erfurt =

St Wigbert's Church
- Wigbertikirche
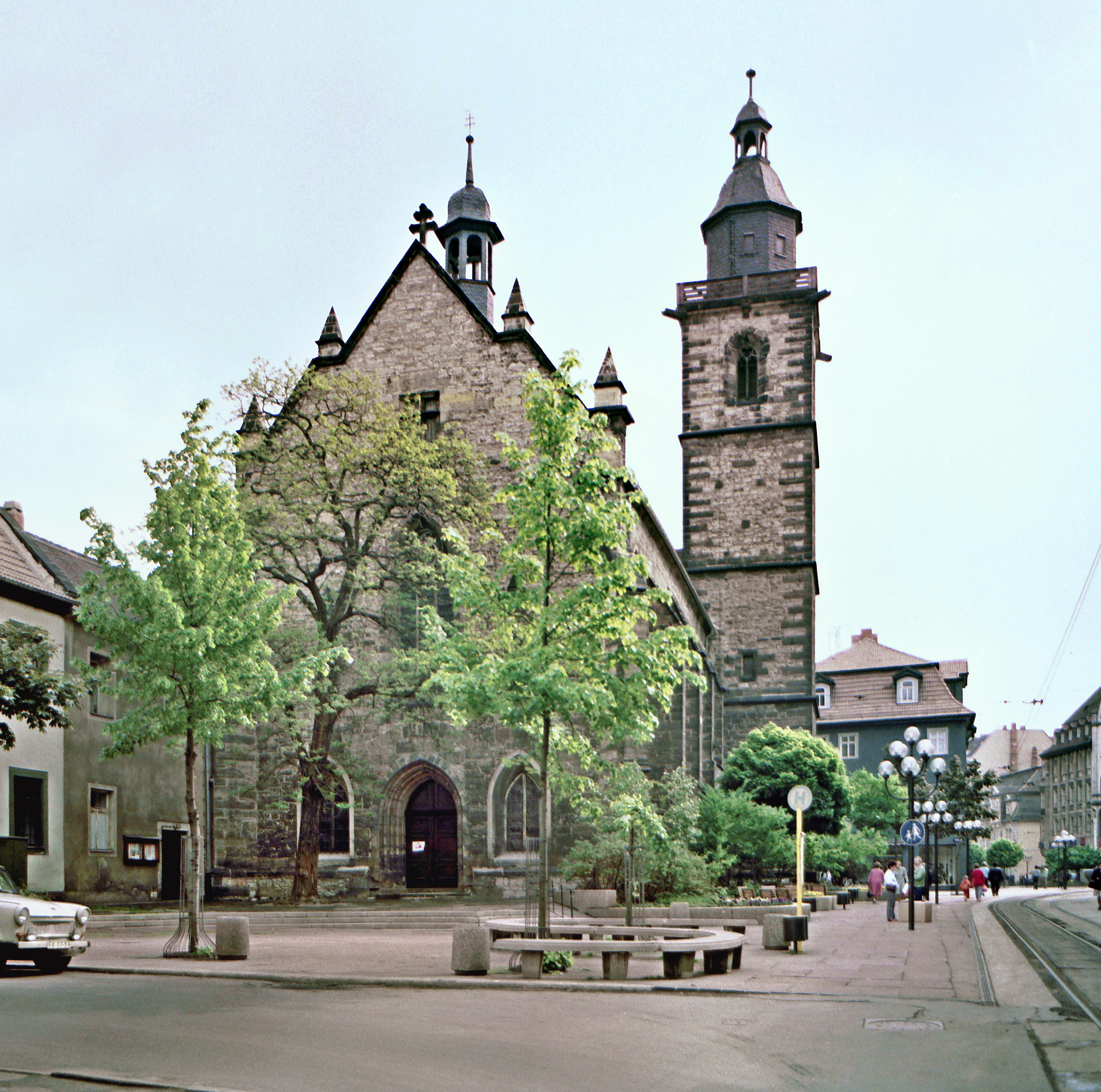
- View from west (1987)

- Location in Germany
- 50°58′28″N 11°1′50″E
- Location: Erfurt, Thuringia
- Country: Germany
- Denomination: Roman Catholic
- Website: www.st-laurentius-erfurt.de/orte-kirchen/st-wigbert/

History
- Status: Subsidiary church
- Dedication: Saint Wigbert

Architecture
- Heritage designation: Kulturdenkmal in Thuringia
- Style: Late Gothic
- Years built: 1409–1473

Administration
- Diocese: Diocese of Erfurt

St Wigbert's Church (German: Wigbertikirche) in the city of Erfurt in Thuringia, Germany, is a Roman Catholic church building dating from the 15th century. Today, it is a subsidiary church of the Catholic parish of St Lawrence's Church.

== History ==
St Wigbert's Church was first mentioned in a document in 1210. It had been a parish church since 1223. The church was built in its present form in 1409–1473. The patron saint of the church is Saint Wigbert, who was a companion of Boniface, the founder of the diocese.

In 1651, the Order of the Augustinian Hermits acquired the Valentinerhof ("Valentines' Yard") in the immediate vicinity of the church for a new monastery building. After Erfurt was returned to the territorial power of Mainz in 1664, the church functioned as the court church of the neighbouring governors until 1802. In 1668, the church was given to the Augustinian Hermits for use as a monastery church, so that at this time it could claim a triple function: parish, court and monastery church.

Until the final dissolution of the monastery in 1822, the respective head of the monastery was also the parish pastor. With the closure of the monastery, all the monastery buildings except for the cloister and the sacristy were confiscated and since then have exclusively housed state institutions.

On 25 November 1944, St Wigbert's Church was so badly damaged by an aerial mine during the destruction of the neighbouring Barfüßerkirche that services had to be held temporarily in the sacristy. In 1953, a new altar was consecrated. In 1973, the Schuke organ was installed. In 1982, the parishes of St Wigbert and Neuwerkskirche were united into one parish, which was absorbed into the newly formed "Inner City Parish of St Lawrence" in January 2017.

The Gothic winged altar from St Walpurgis' Church in Großengottern has only been in St Wigbert's since 1996. The last major renovation took place at the beginning of the new millennium. The church windows on the theme of "departures" (Aufbrüche) were installed and a new community centre was built. The work was completed with the consecration of the new altar on 4 July 2004.

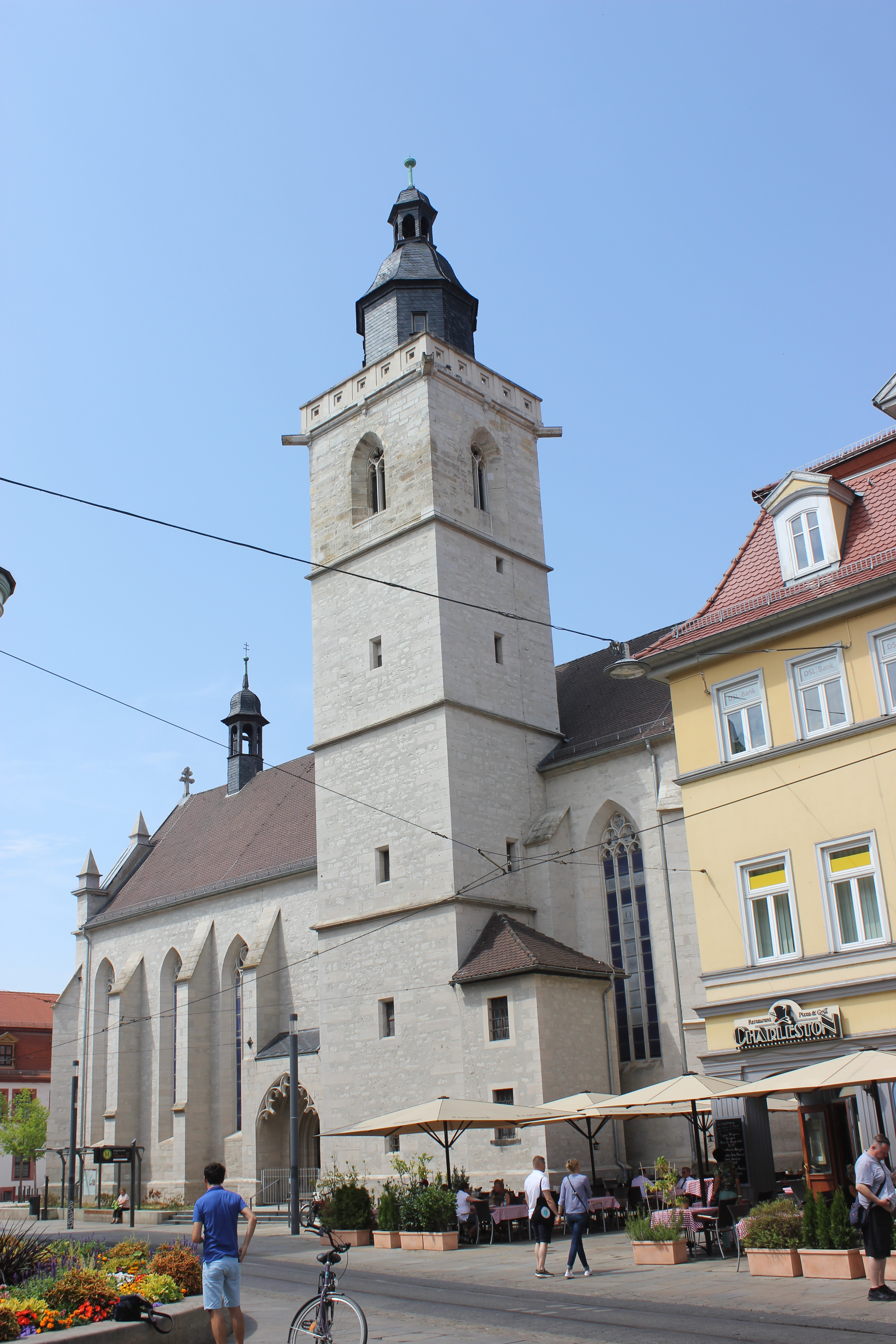
View from southeast

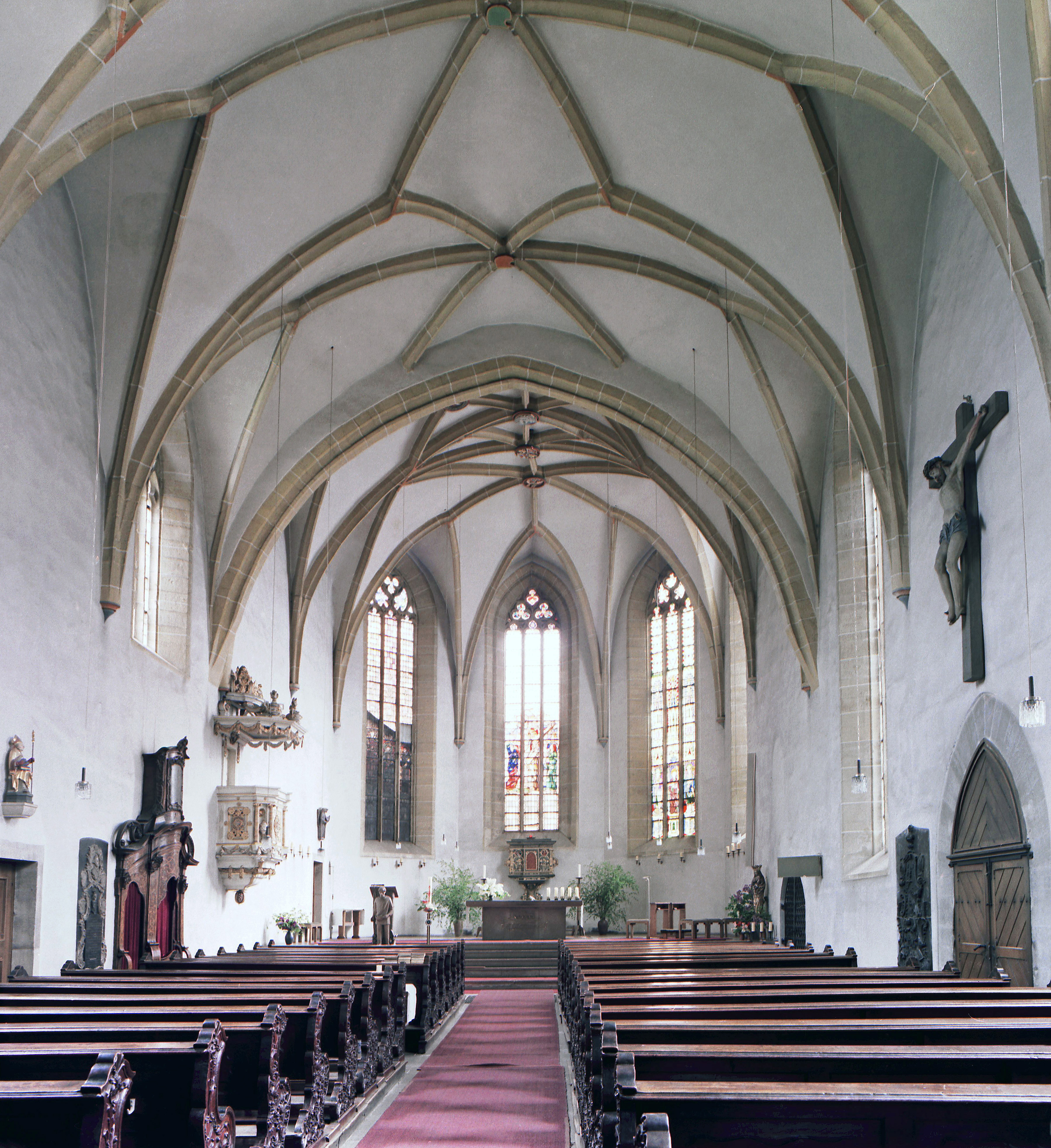
Interior view

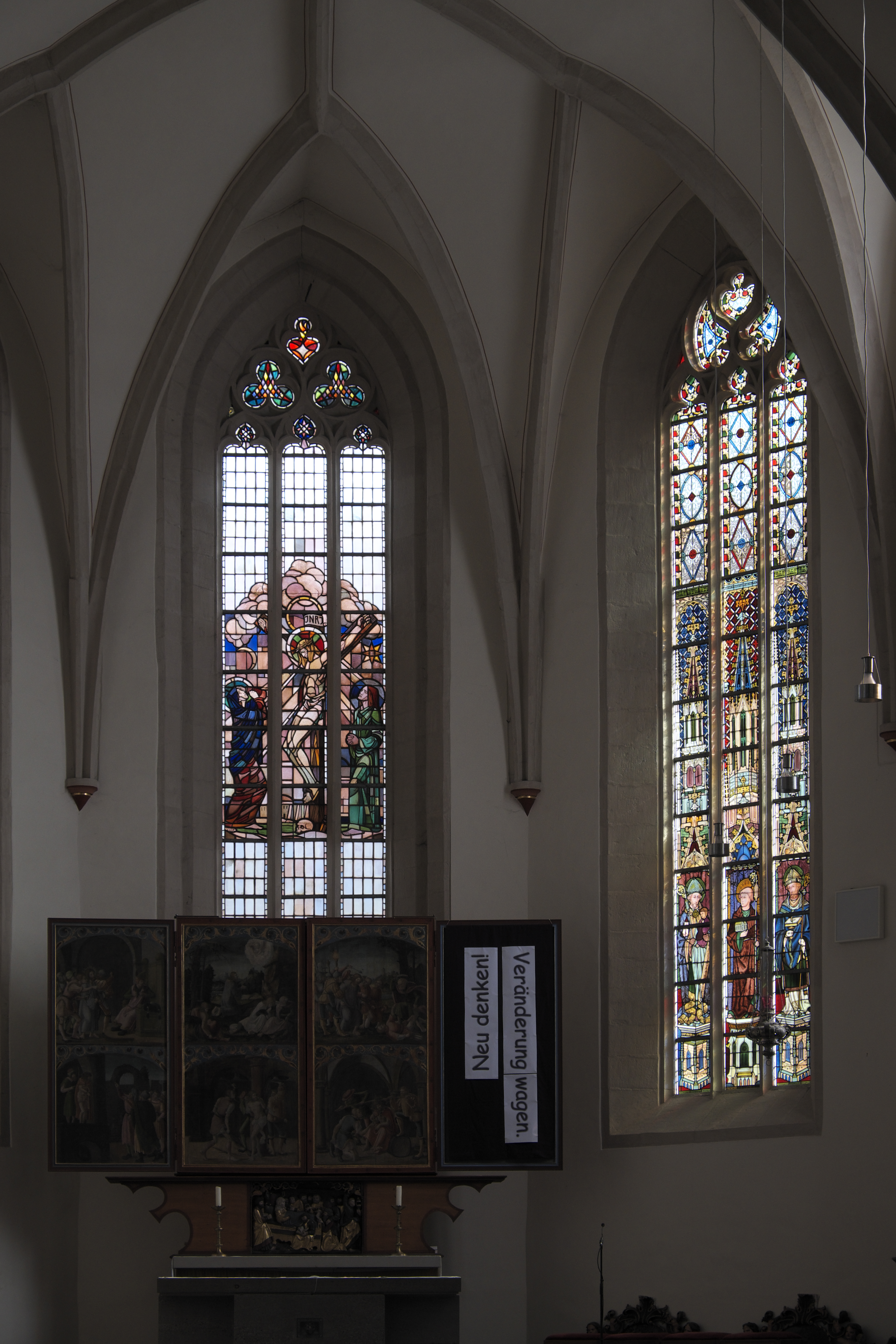
The choir

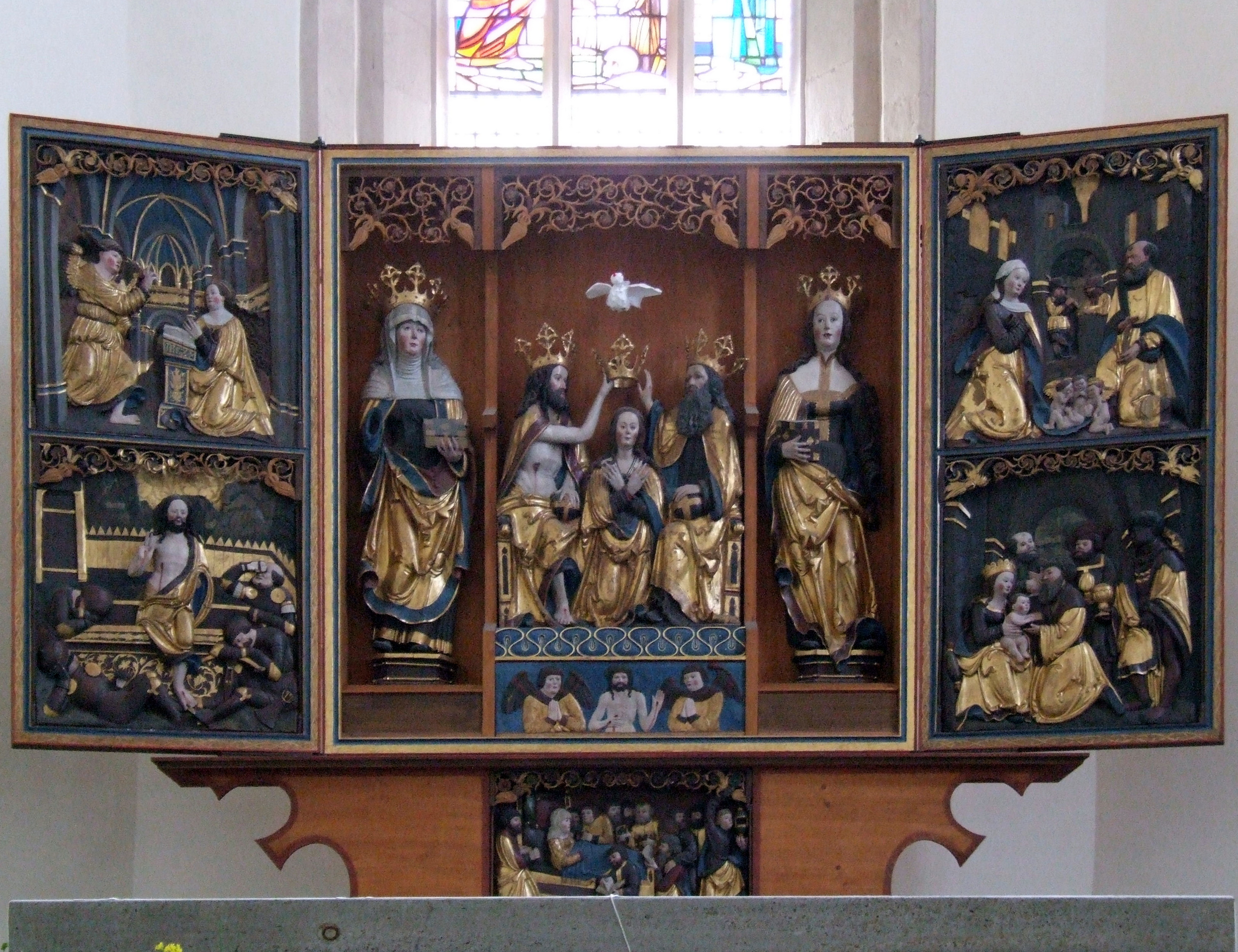
The winged altar (open)

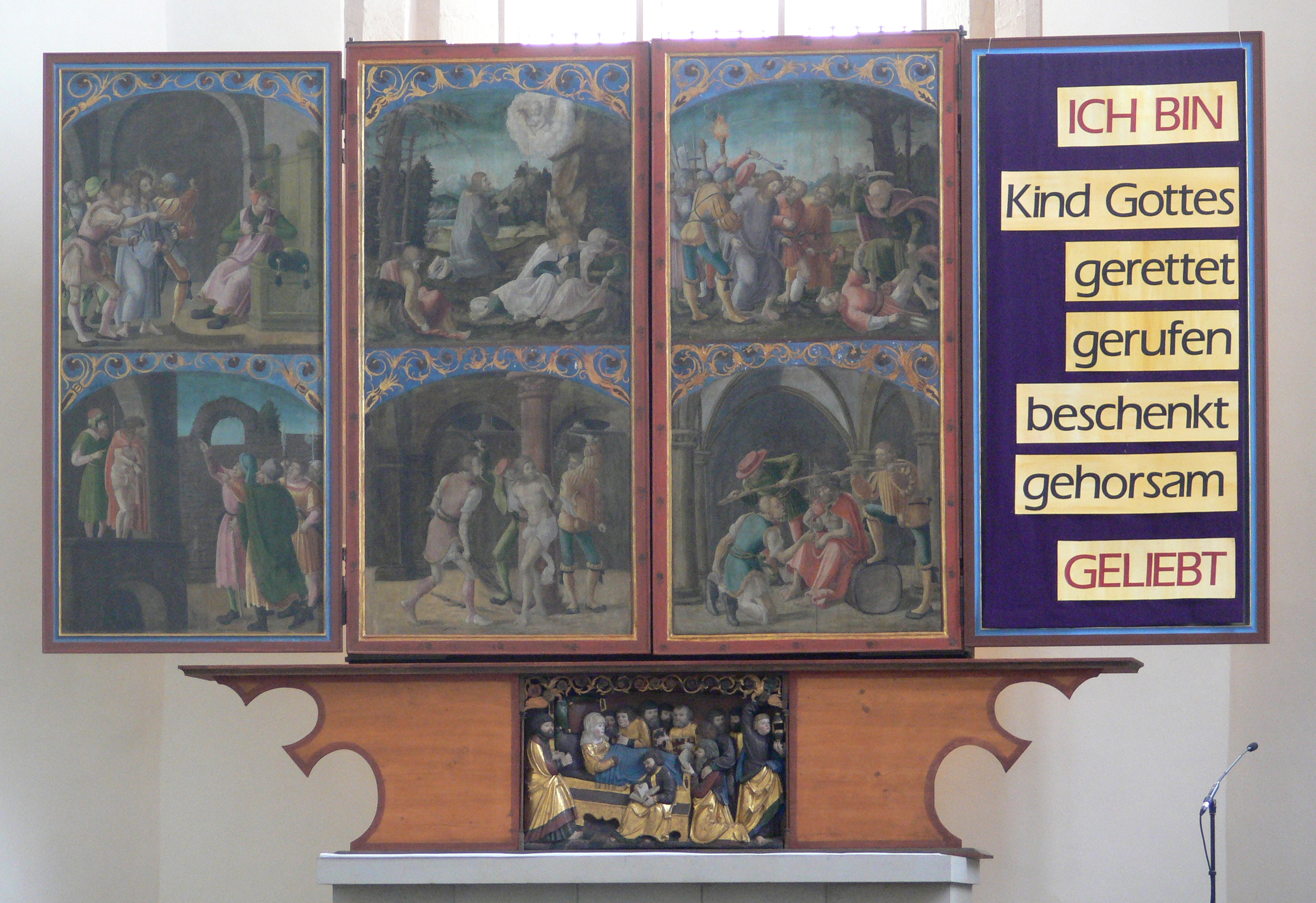
The winged altar (closed)
