= Neuwerk (disambiguation) =

Neuwerk is a tidal island in the Wadden Sea on the German North Sea coast.

Neuwerk may also refer to:

- Great Tower Neuwerk or new work, a watchtower built 1310 on the island Neuwerk
- Neuwerk, a quarter of Hamburg, Germany containing the island Neuwerk
- Neuwerk-Mitte, a quarter of the borough Mönchengladbach-East
- Neuwerk, a German harbor tug
- Neuwerkskirche (Neuwerk Church), a church in Erfurt, Germany
- Neuwerk Church, a church in Goslar, Germany
- Neuwerk garden or Gottorf Castle, a castle in Schleswig, Germany
- Bocșa, a town in southwestern Romania
