= Neuwerkskirche =

- Cruciskirche
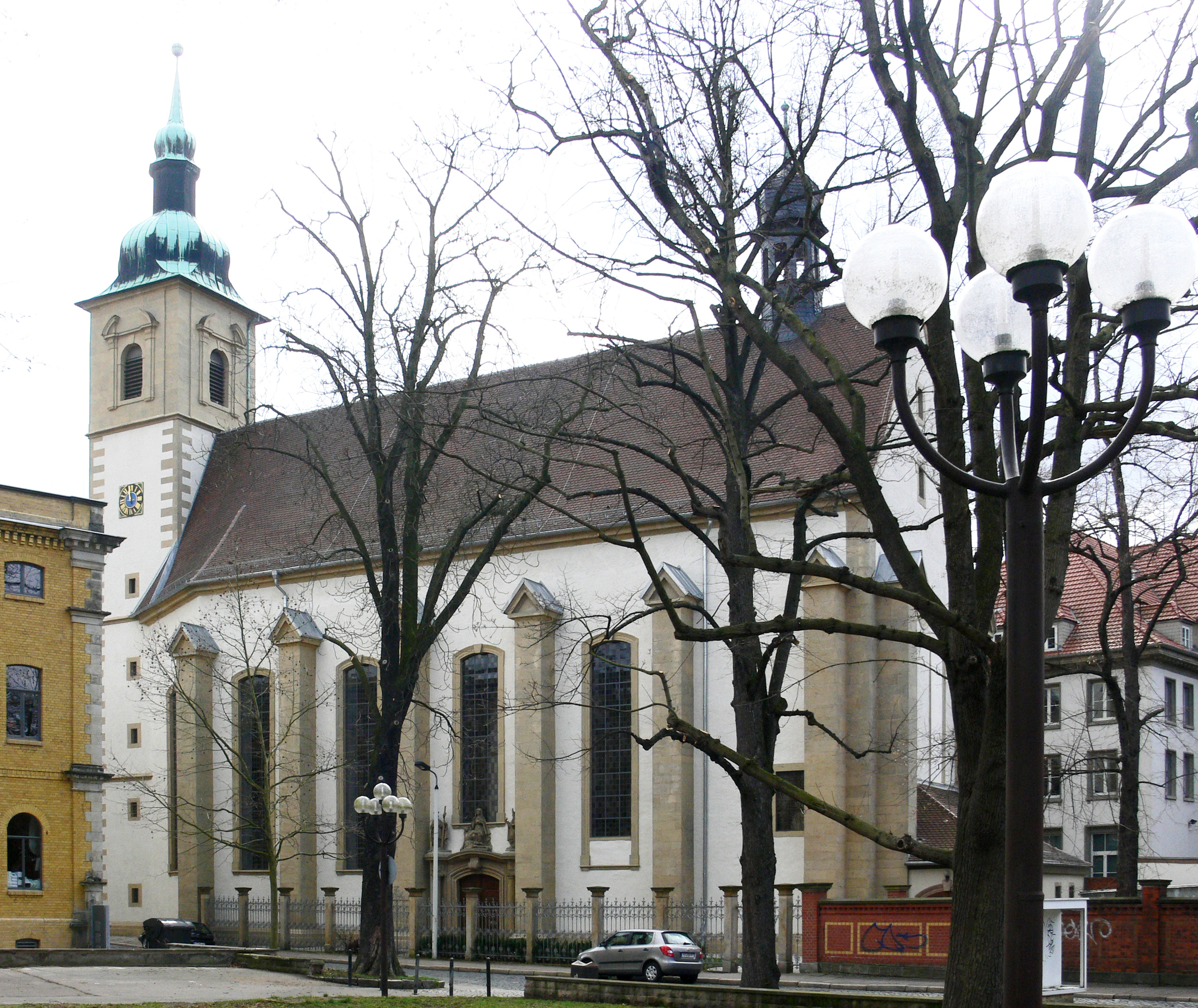

- Location in Germany
- 50°58′20.5″N 11°01′30.1″E
- Location: Erfurt, Thuringia
- Country: Germany
- Denomination: Roman Catholic
- Website: www.st-laurentius-erfurt.de/orte-kirchen/st-crucis/

History
- Status: Subsidiary church
- Dedication: The Holy Cross

Architecture
- Heritage designation: Kulturdenkmal in Thuringia
- Style: Late Gothic, Baroque

The Neuwerkskirche (pronounced [ˈnɔʏvɐksˌkɪʁçə], also Cruciskirche, "Cross Church") at the edge of the historical part of the city of Erfurt in Thuringia, Germany, is a Roman Catholic church building dating from the 15th century. Today, it is a branch church of the Catholic parish of St Lawrence's Church.

== History ==
The Neuwerkskirche was first mentioned in a document in 1168. The Late Romanesque building stood in the new part of the city built in 1166 named Auf dem neuen Werke ("By the new facility"), from which its name is derived. The church with the patronage of the Holy Cross (Latin: sanctae crucis, hence Cruciskirche) belonged to the convent of the Augustinian nuns, the Neuwerkskloster. From 1285, it was used as a parish church. In 1466–73, the present church was built in Late Gothic forms, which were then baroqueised between 1731 and 1735; on 25 September 1735, it was consecrated by Bishop Gudenus. The interior was completed by 1740. In 1982, the parish was merged with St Wigbert's parish, which was absorbed into the newly formed "Inner City Parish of St Lawrence" in January 2017.

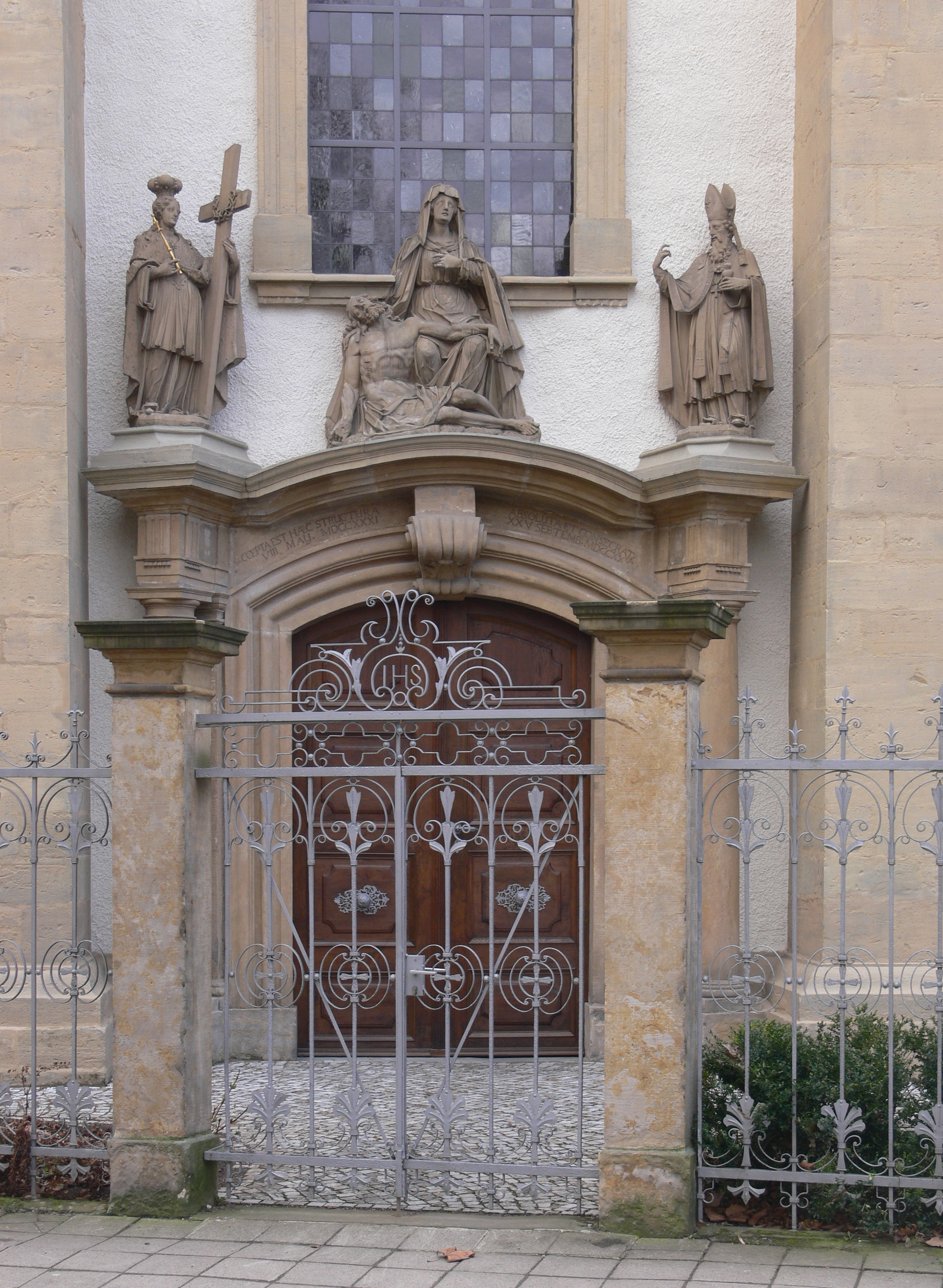
The portal

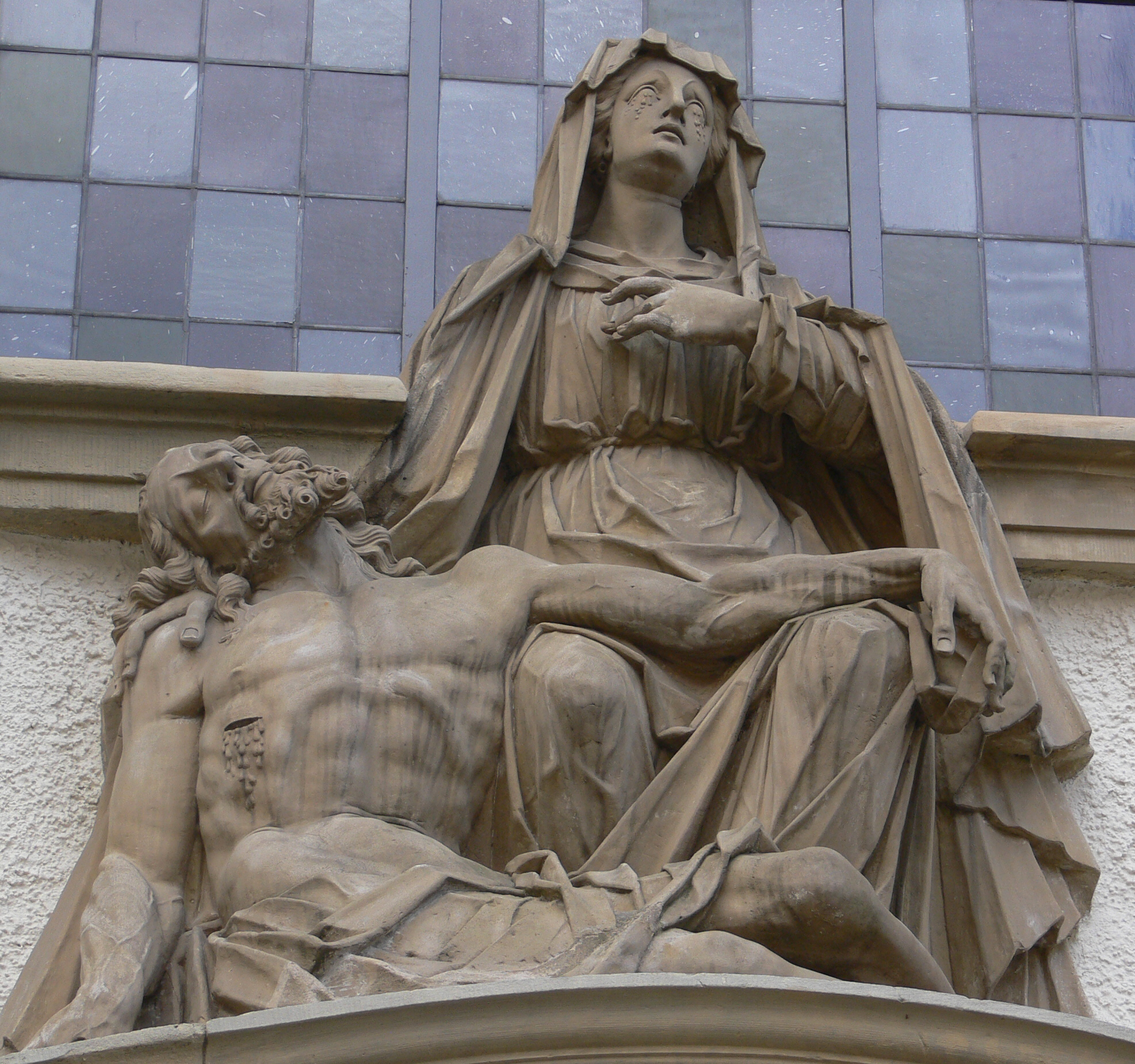
Pietà above the portal

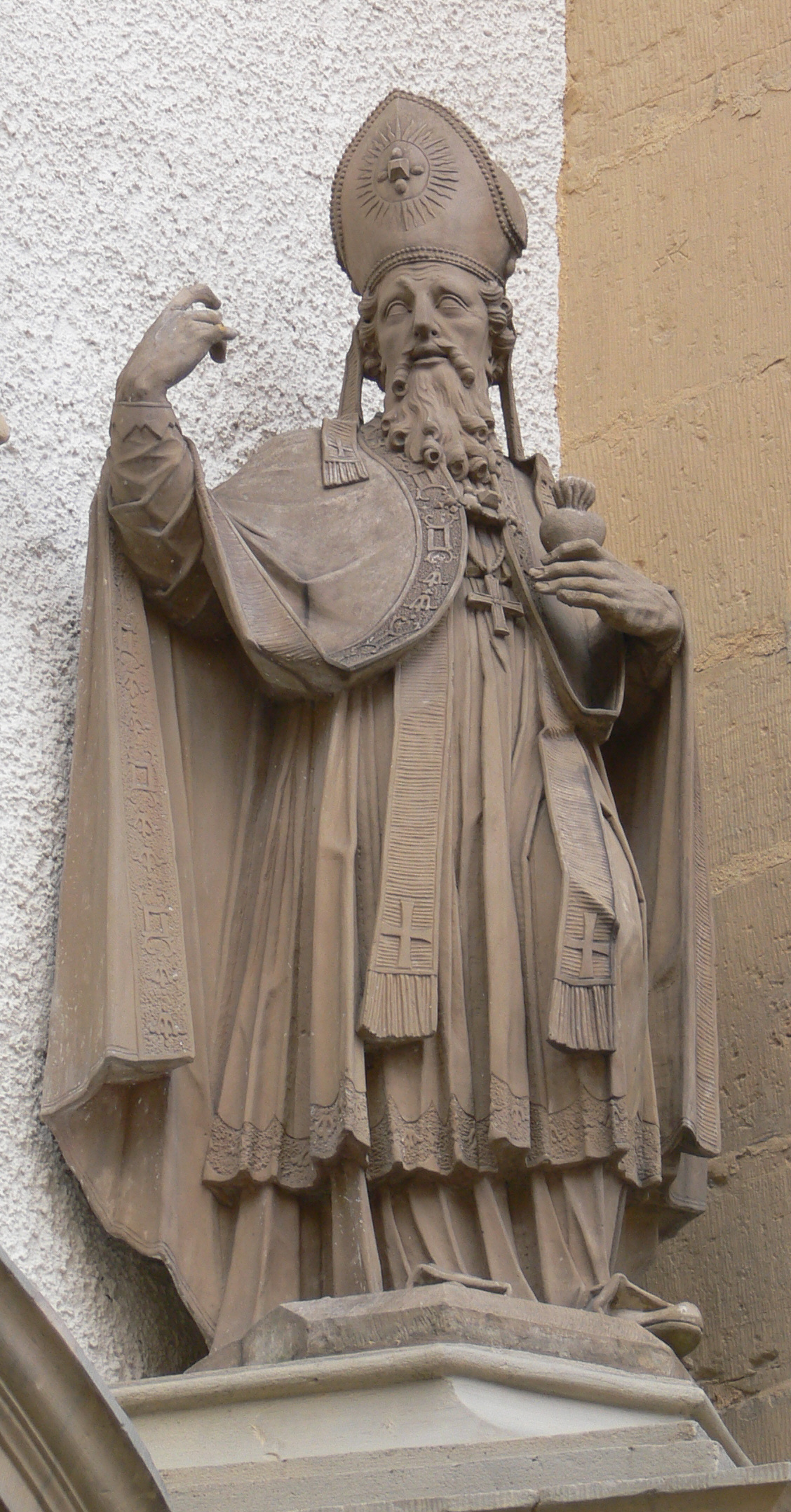
Augustinus

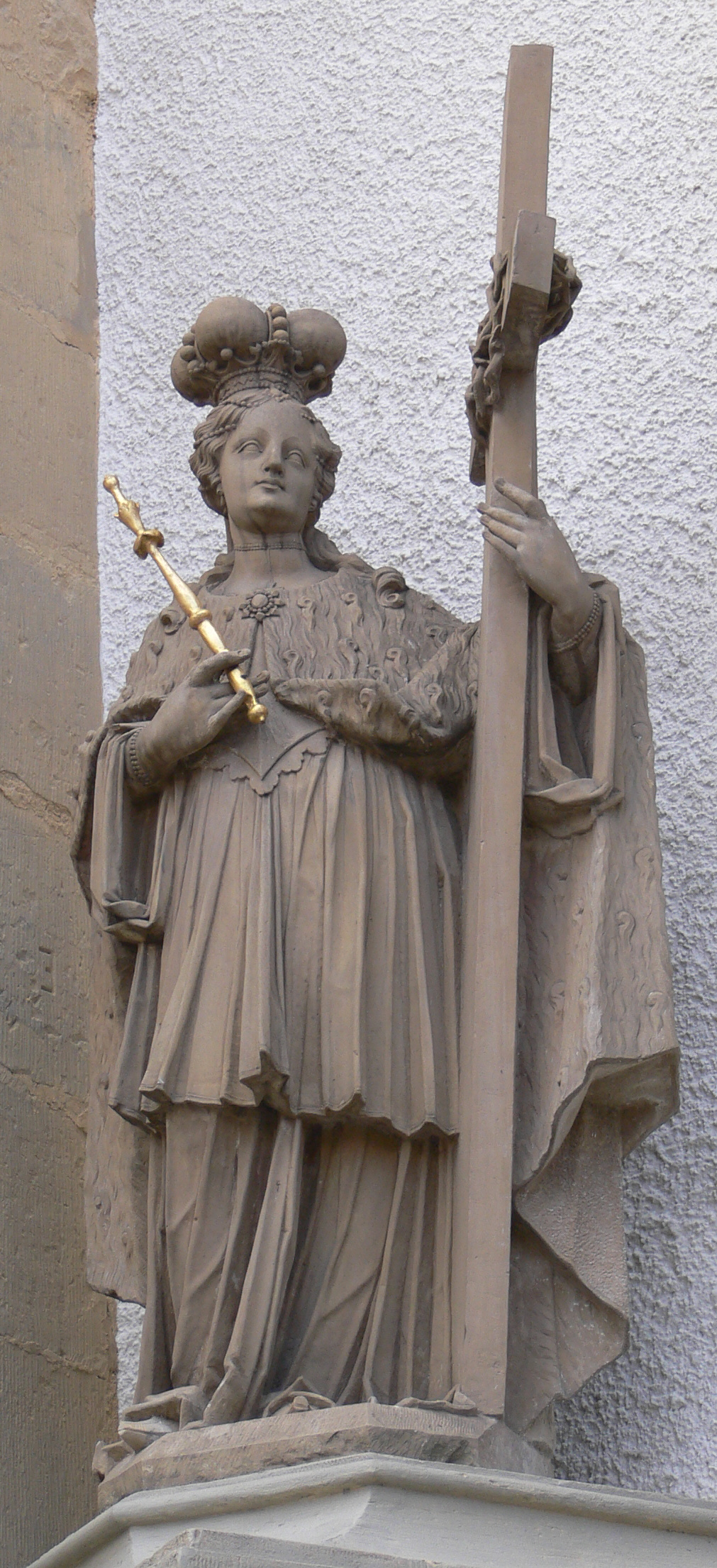
Helena

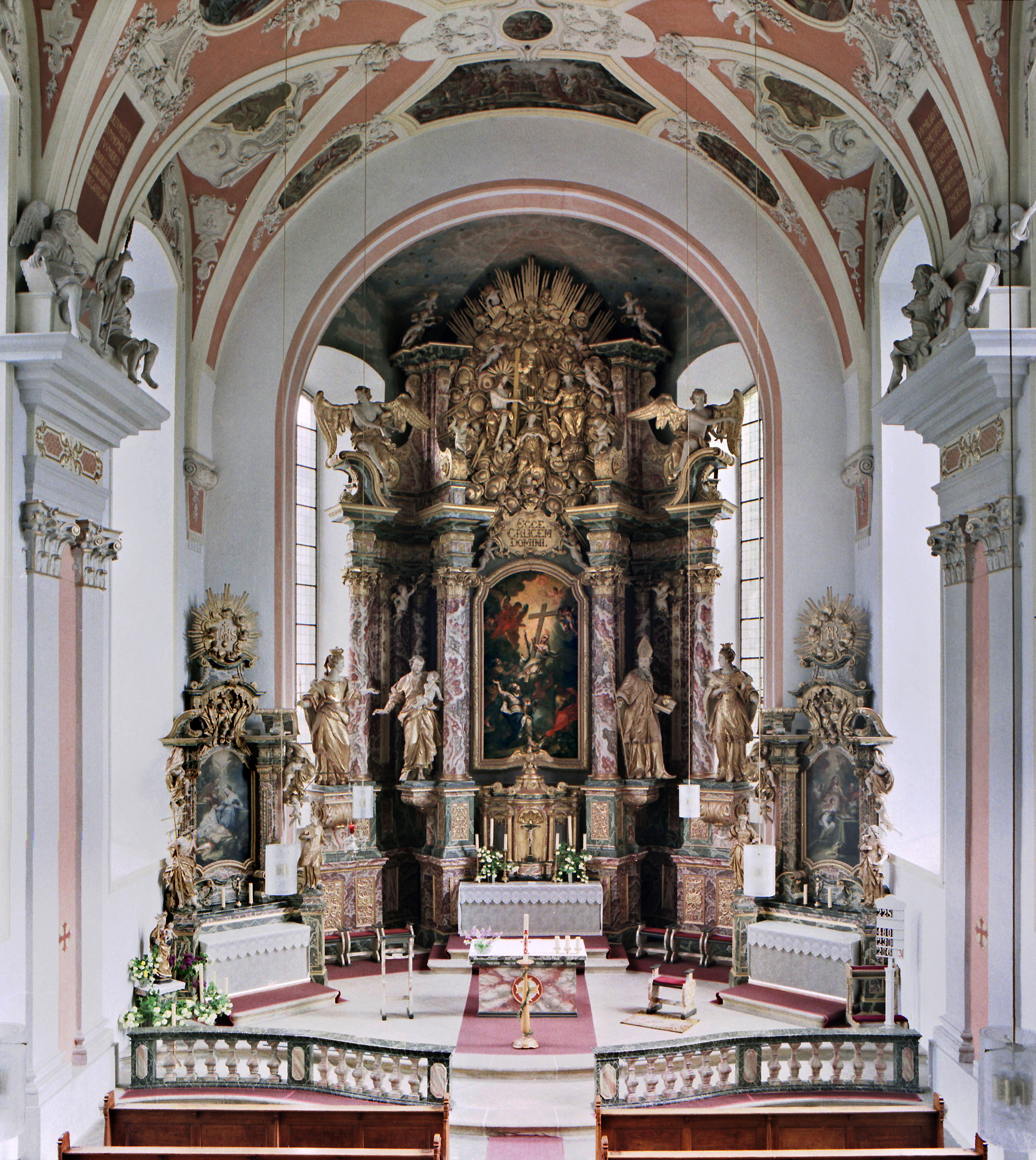
The altar

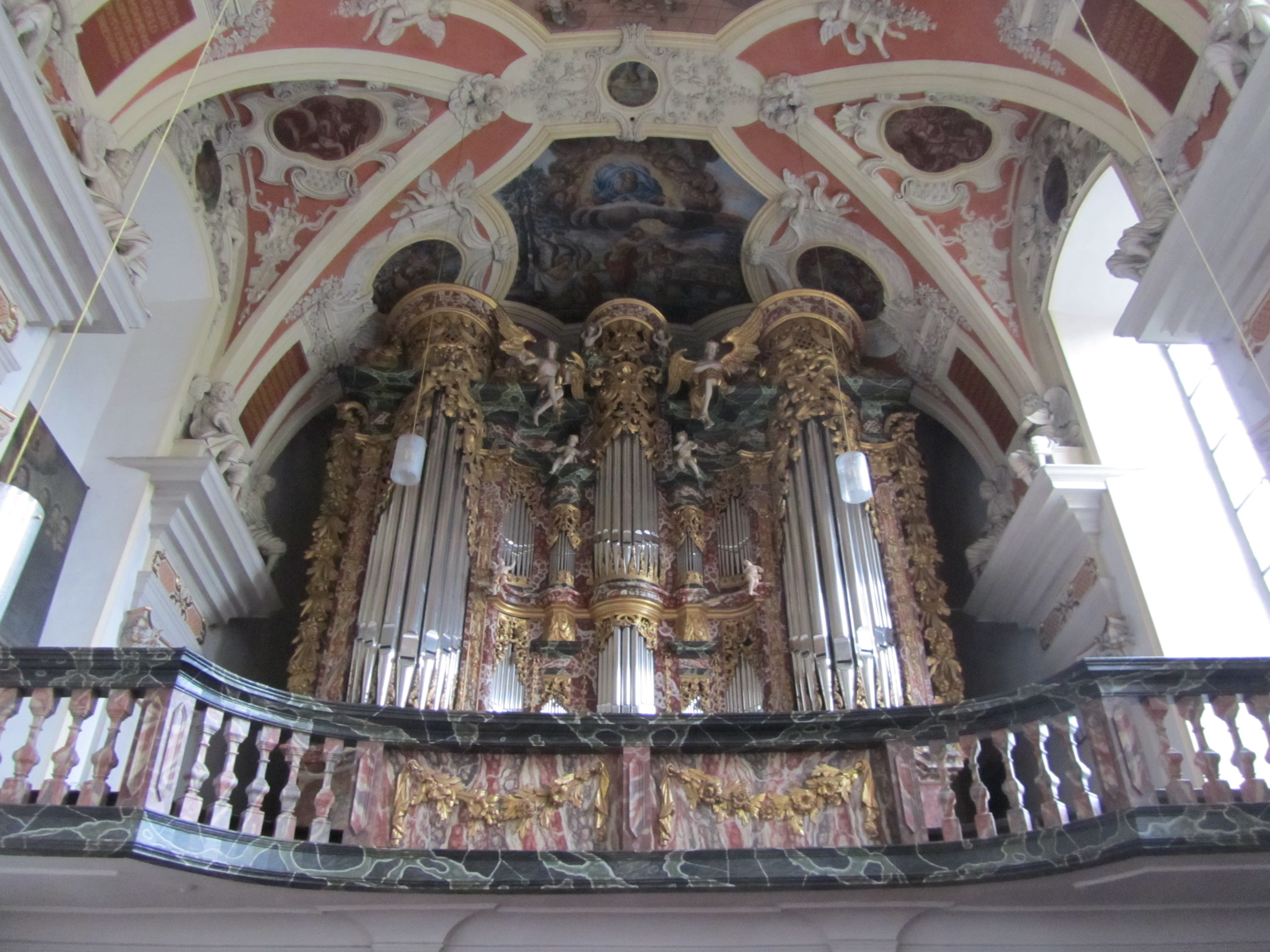
The organ

== Organ ==
The organ of the Neuwerkskirche was built by the master organ builder Franciscus Volckland from Erfurt from about 1732 to 1737. The purely mechanical instrument has 28 stops on two manuals and pedal. It was restored and partially reconstructed in 2000–2003 by the organ-building company Alexander Schuke from Potsdam.

I Main division CD–c^{3}
1.	Principal	8′
2.	Quintatön	16′
3.	Viola di Gamba	8′
4.	Gemshorn	8′
5.	Bordun	8′
6.	Traversière	8′
7.	Octave	4′
8.	Quinte	3′
9.	Sesquialtera	2 2/3′
10.	Octave	2′
11.	Mixtur IV
12.	Cymbel IV
13.	Vox humana	8′
	Tremulant
	Glockenspiel

II Chest division CD–c^{3}
14.	Principal	4′
15.	Quintatön	8′
16.	Gedackt	8′
17.	Flaut douce	8′
18.	Nachthorn	4′
19.	Quinte	3′
20.	Octave	2′
21.	Terz	1 1/3′
22.	Mixtur IV

Pedal CD–c^{1}
23.	Principal	16′
24.	Violone	16′
25.	Subbass	16′
26.	Oktave	8′
27.	Octave	4′
28.	Posaune	16′

- Couplers: manual shift coupler II/I, I/P
