= St Martin Church, Veľký Ďur =

Church in Nitra Region, Slovakia

Coordinates: 48°12′N 18°27′E

St Martin Church, Veľký Ďur in the Levice District in the Nitra Region of Slovakia.

== History ==
The Church of St Martin is a Roman Catholic church in Velky Dur, situated beyond the village, dating from 1332 A.D.

St Martin's was the medieval Roman Church of Gerul(Geurad) chapelry. In 1665 it became a filial church of the Lok reformed chapelry. After a conflict with the church in Lok, it became a Roman chapelry church. Then, in 1705, once the conflict had ceased, it became a filial church of Lok again till 1712, when this filial once again reverted to a Roman chapelry.

Later, after invasion of reformed church, the church was ravaged. In 1732 it was rebuilt from stone from devastated church, gravel, sand and bricks. It has no tower, just one belfry.
