= Veľký Ďur =

Village and municipality in Slovakia

Veľký Ďur Nagygyőröd
- Municipality
- Flag

- Location of Veľký Ďur in the Nitra Region Location of Veľký Ďur in Slovakia
- Coordinates: 48.21°N 18.45°E
- Country: Slovakia
- Region: Nitra Region
- District: Levice District
- First mentioned: 1205

Area
  - Total: 22.02 km^{2} (8.50 sq mi)
- Elevation: 183 m (600 ft)

Population (2025)
  - Total: 1,299
- Time zone: UTC+1 (CET)
  - Summer (DST): UTC+2 (CEST)
- Postal code: 935 34
- Area code: +421 36
- Vehicle registration plate (until 2022): LV
- Website: www.velkydur.sk

Veľký Ďur (Hungarian: Nagygyőröd) is a village and municipality in the Levice District in the Nitra Region of Slovakia.

== History ==
In historical records the village was first mentioned in 1205.

== Geography ==
The municipality lies at an altitude of 183 metres (600 ft) and covers an area of 22.02 km^{2} (8.50 sq mi) (2025).

== Population ==
Population statistic (10 years)
Year	1995	2005	2015	2025
Count	1323	1305	1270	1299
Difference		−1.36%	−2.68%	+2.28%

Population statistic
Year	2024	2025
Count	1308	1299
Difference		−0.68%

It has a population of 1299 people (31 December 2025).

=== Ethnicity ===
Census 2021 (1+ %)
Ethnicity	Number	Fraction
Slovak	1218	92.34%
Not found out	72	5.45%
Hungarian	26	1.97%
Total	1319	

In year 2021 was 1319 people by ethnicity 1218 as Slovak, 72 as Not found out, 26 as Hungarian, 6 as Romani, 5 as Czech, 4 as Other, 2 as Ukrainian, 2 as Italian, 2 as English, 1 as Polish and 1 as German.

Note on population: The difference values of population numbers in the table "Population statistic" and in the sections "Ethnicity" & "Religion" is caused by the use of various statistical methods.

=== Religion ===
Census 2021 (1+ %)
Religion	Number	Fraction
Roman Catholic Church	880	66.72%
None	270	20.47%
Not found out	94	7.13%
Evangelical Church	26	1.97%
Calvinist Church	16	1.21%
Total	1319	

In year 2021 was 1319 people by religion 880 from Roman Catholic Church, 270 from None, 94 from Not found out, 26 from Evangelical Church, 16 from Calvinist Church, 9 from Greek Catholic Church, 8 from Christian Congregations in Slovakia, 4 from Jehovah's Witnesses, 4 from Ad hoc movements, 2 from Islam, 2 from Other, 2 from United Methodist Church, 1 from Eastern Orthodox Church and 1 from Czechoslovak Hussite Church.

== Facilities ==
The village has a public library, gym, church and football pitch. It also has its own birth registry office.
