= St. Andrew's Church, Erfurt =

St. Andrew's Church
- German: Andreaskirche
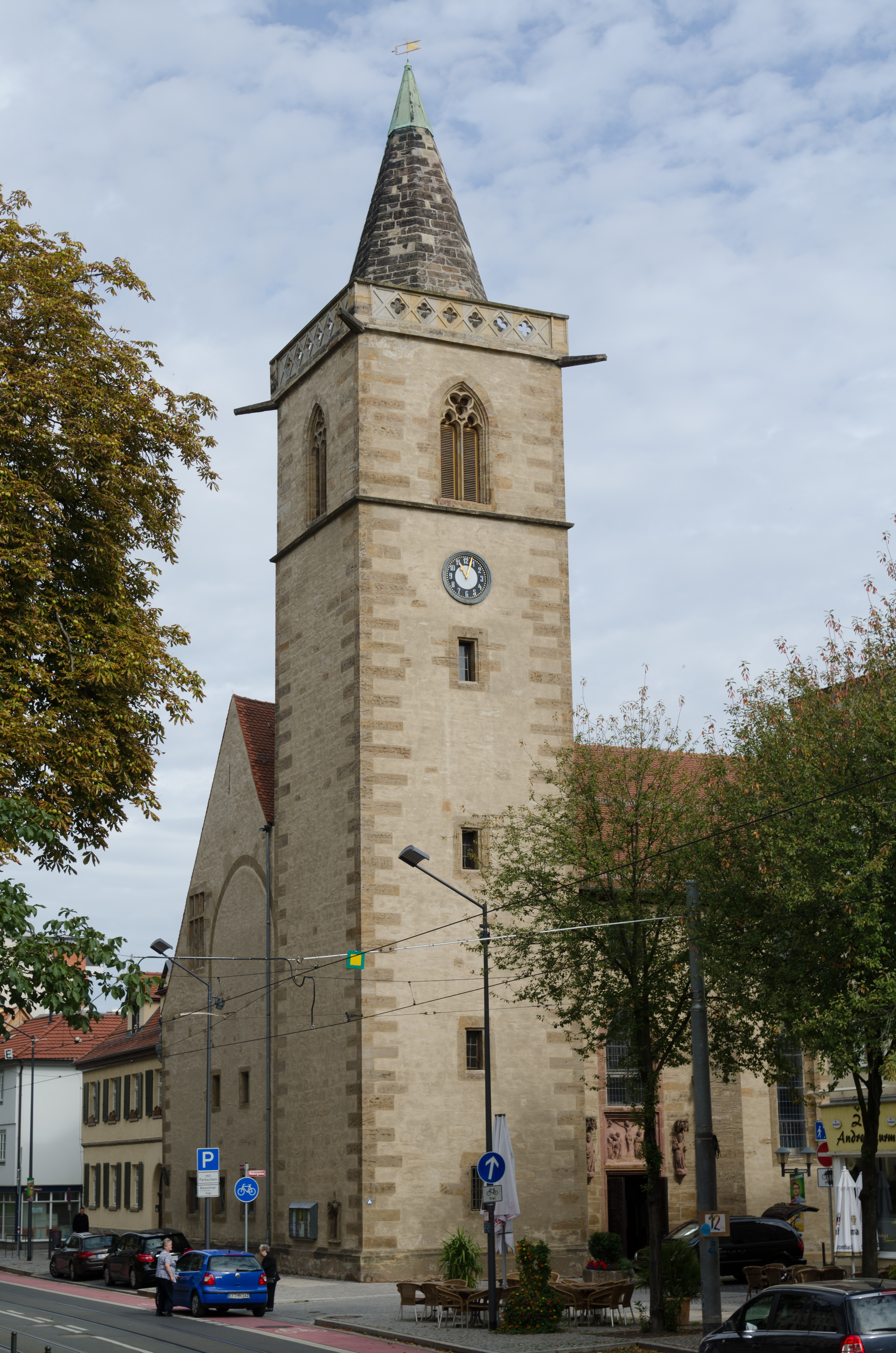

- Location in Germany
- 50°58′49.34″N 11°01′21.77″E
- Location: Erfurt, Thuringia
- Address: Andreasstraße 14; 99084 Erfurt
- Country: Germany
- Denomination: Lutheran
- Previous denomination: Catholic
- Website: andreasgemeinde.wordpress.com

History
- Status: Parish church
- Dedication: Andrew the Apostle

Architecture
- Heritage designation: Kulturdenkmal in Thuringia
- Style: Gothic
- Years built: 15th century

Administration
- Diocese: Protestant Church in Central Germany

St. Andrew's Church (German: Andreaskirche) is a Gothic church building at Andreasstraße (Andrew Street) in the historical centre of the city of Erfurt in Thuringia, Germany. The surrounding quarter Andreasviertel and the northern district Andreasvorstadt are named after it. St. Andrew's Church is now a Lutheran parish church.

== History ==
A preceding building was first mentioned in a document in 1182. In 1210, construction of a new church began, and it was completed around 1370. A fire destroyed the church in 1416; it was rebuilt in the later course of the 15th century. Around 1830, the building was modified. It has a flat ceiling with a pointed barrel; a crucifixion relief from around 1370 is emblazoned above the southern main entrance. A stone relief dating from 1450 shows the motif of the Lamentation of Christ. The Reformation was introduced in 1522; since then, St. Andrew's Church has been Protestant.

In 1604, the church's congregation merged with the neighbouring St. Maurice's and, in 1973, with the congregation of St. Michael's Church. Since 1727, a wooden model of the epitaph for Martin Luther has been in St. Andrew's Church.

In 1836, in the wake of the Prussian Union of Churches, Johannes Andreas August Grabau, then the pastor of St. Andrew's, was imprisoned for refusing to utilize the new United Agenda. Two years later, he led much of his congregation to the United States, and went on to form the Buffalo Synod.

== Organ ==
Johann Rudolph Ahle was the cantor at a predecessor instrument in the 17th century, which was built by Johann Georg Kummer from Dachwig. The present organ was built in 1987–1989 by the company Mitteldeutscher Orgelbau A. Voigt from Bad Liebenwerda in the historical organ case from 1787, partly reusing pipe material from the predecessor organ. The instrument has 25 stops on two manuals and pedal. The actions are mechanical.

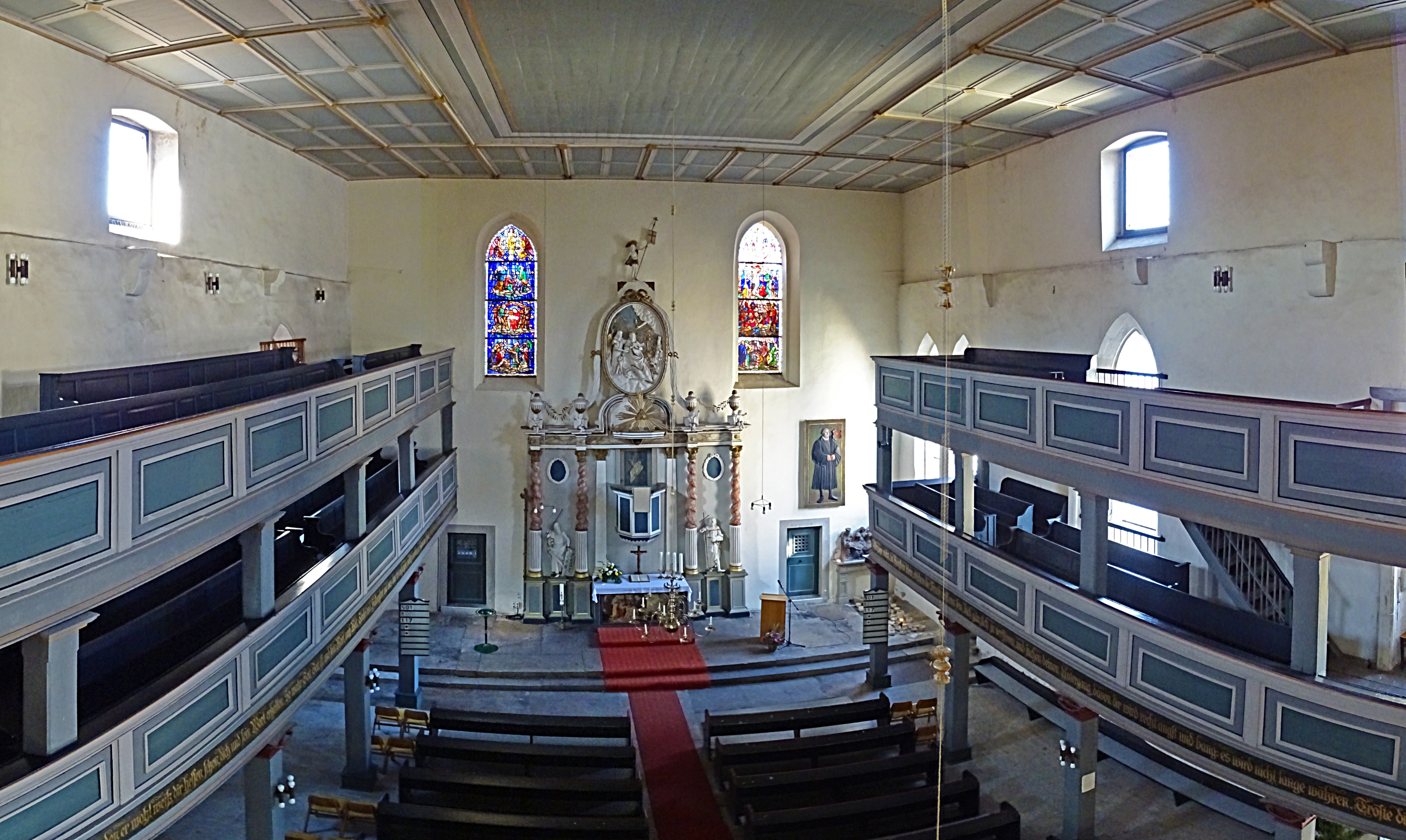

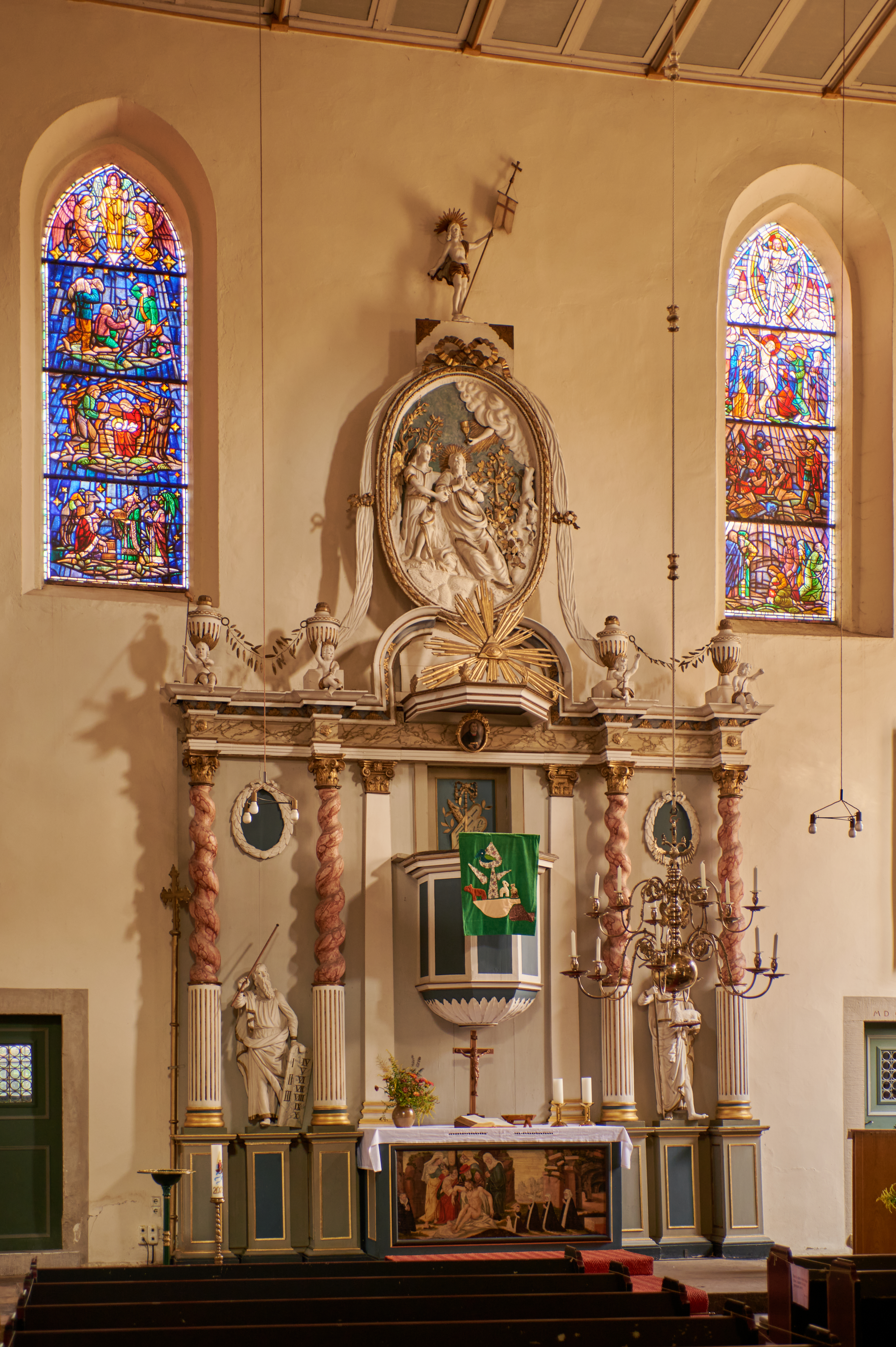

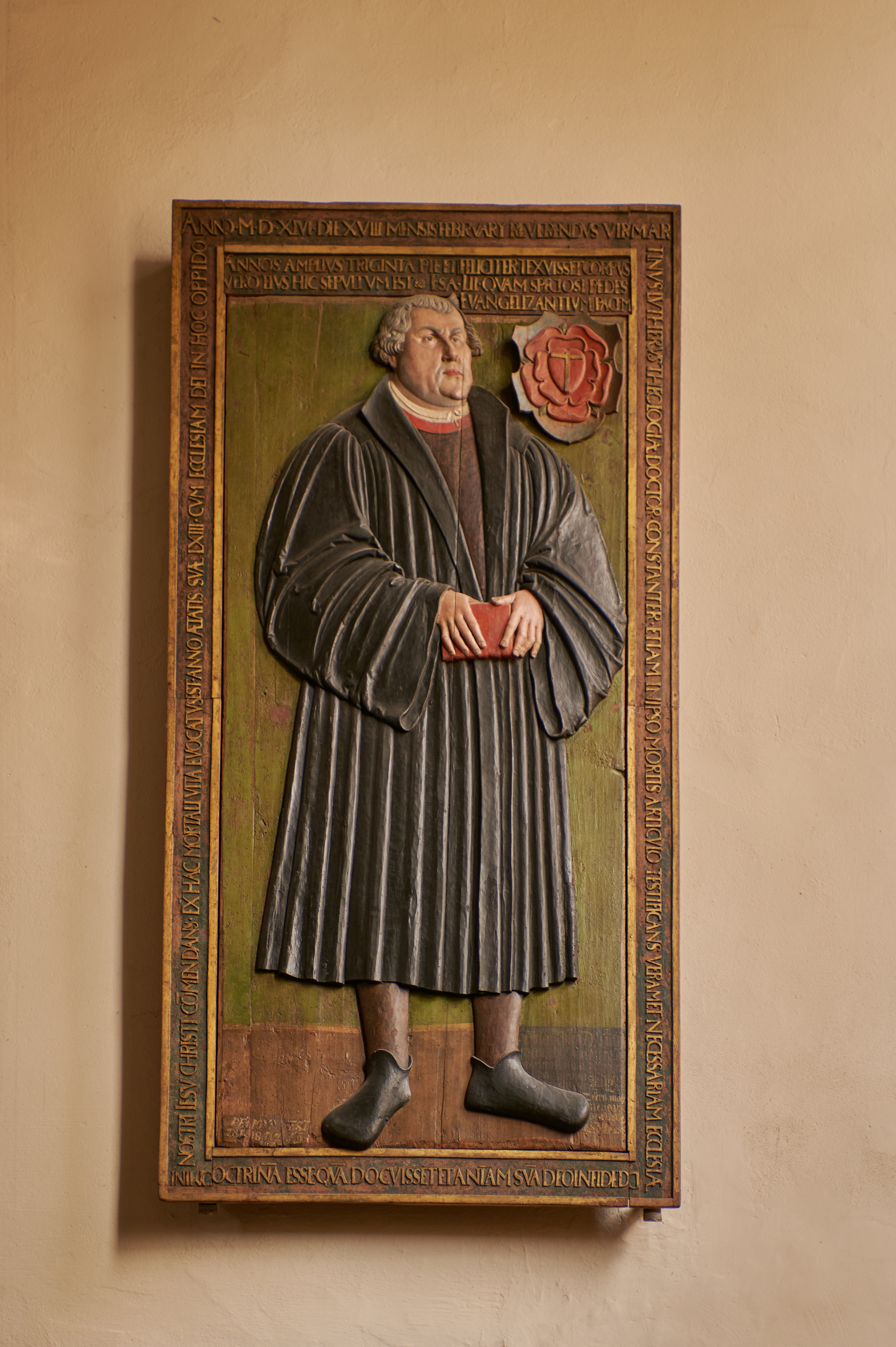

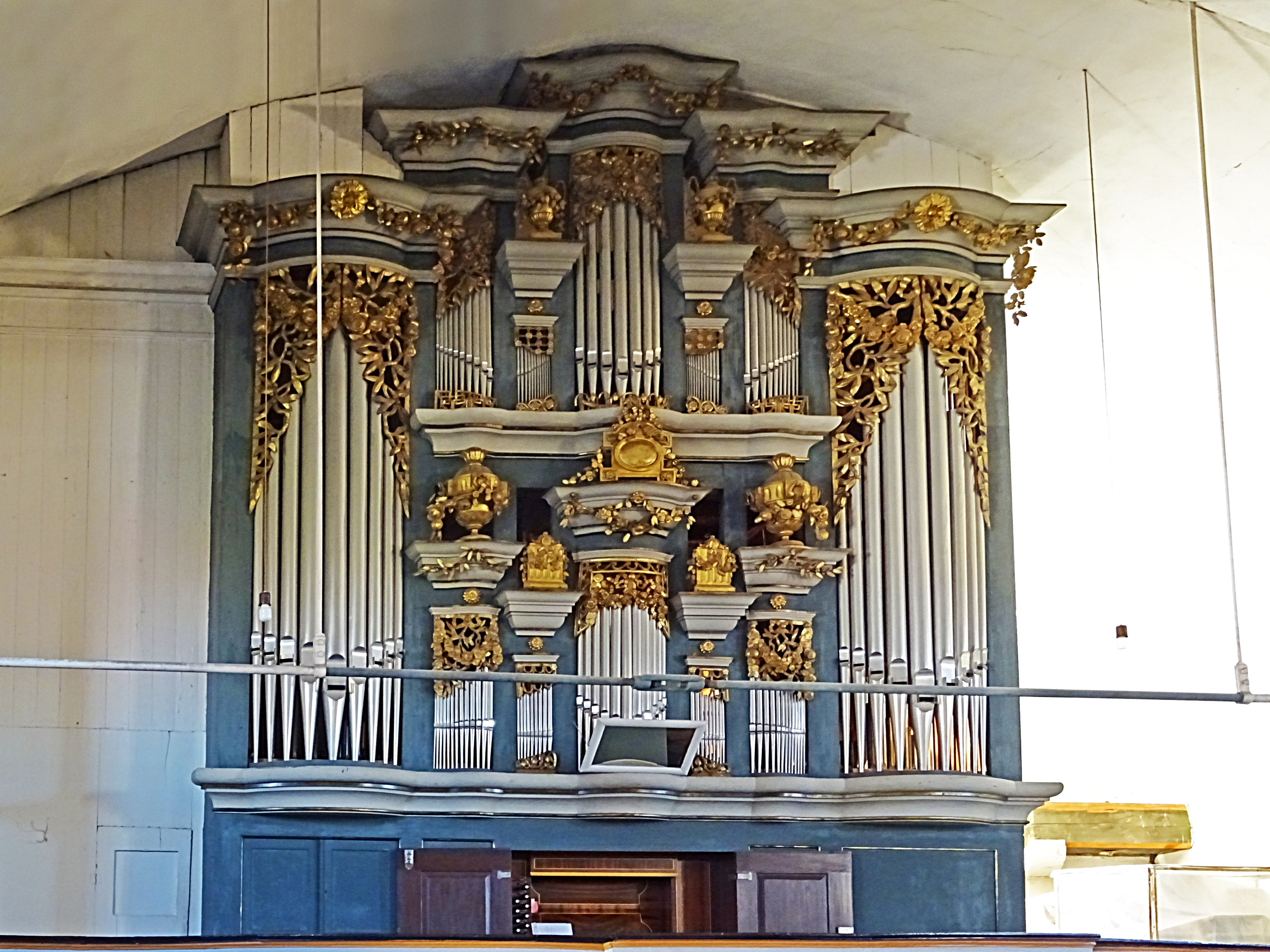
