= St Lawrence's Church, Erfurt =

St Lawrence's Church
- Lorenzkirche
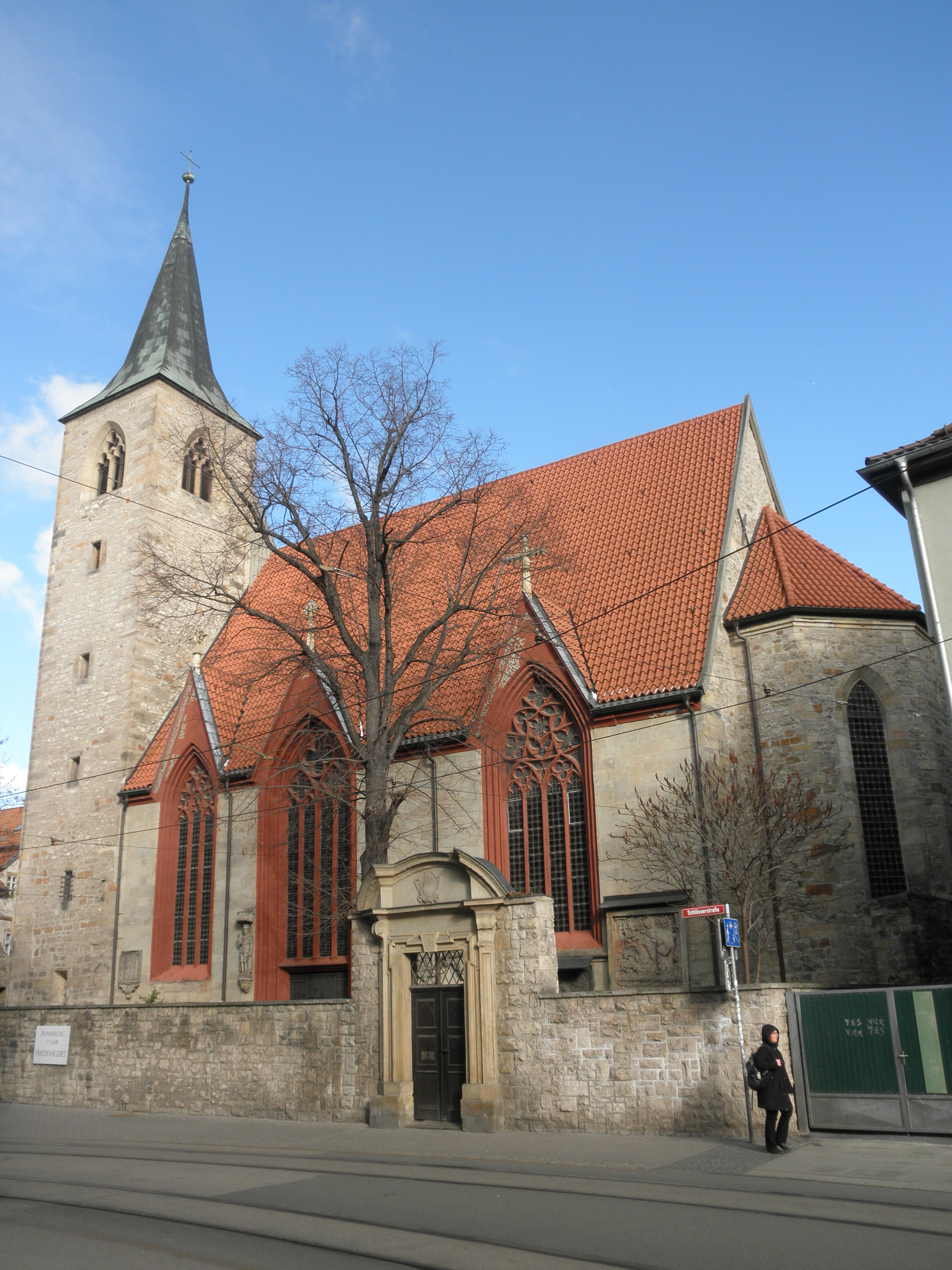
- View from Schlösserstraße

- Location in Germany
- 50°58′37″N 11°02′00″E
- Location: Erfurt, Thuringia
- Country: Germany
- Denomination: Roman Catholic

History
- Status: Parish church
- Founded: 1138
- Dedication: St Lawrence, St Wenceslas

Architecture
- Heritage designation: Kulturdenkmal in Thuringia
- Style: Gothic
- Years built: around 1300, after 1413, 1888–1893

St Lawrence's Church (German: Lorenzkirche) in the city of Erfurt in Thuringia, Germany, is a Roman Catholic parish church dating from around 1300. The Gothic hall church is located on the northern edge of Anger square and at the beginning of the Schlösserstraße in the centre of the historical part of Erfurt.

== History ==
St Lawrence's Church was founded in 1138 by the Mainz viceroy Giselbert. It was first built around 1140, consecrated by the then provost of Erfurt and later archbishop of Mainz, Adelbert II, and had been a parish church since its foundation. The original building was Romanesque, of which almost nothing remains.

A second building was probably erected at the end of the 13th to the beginning of the 14th century in Gothic style; the square tower and parts of the west wall are the last evidence of this era. After the great city fire of 1413, the church, which until then had a single aisle, was extended on the north side to form a two-aisled church. In the course of extensive restoration work in 1888 to 1893, the east wall, which had been straight until then, was broken through. Two of the original three windows were reinstalled in the newly created polygonal apse. Thereby, the present structural condition of the church was achieved. A Late Gothic door in the eastern part of the north wall forms the entrance to the sacristy, which was built in 1925.

The church's patron saints are St Lawrence, who gave the church its name, and St Wenceslas. Their statues flank the south portal of the church.

The epitaphs on the southern exterior and three large sculptures inside the church are important for the history of Erfurt's funerary sculptures. In addition, the church interior contains a Gothic winged altar and figurative representations of saints from the High and Late Middle Ages, including a rare sandstone representation of Christ on one of the columns.

Between 1664 and 1773, the church was used by the Jesuits who lived in the Jesuit College opposite.

The tower contains a bell from 1445 and two from 1962.

During the air raids on Erfurt in the Second World War, the church suffered considerable damage to the roof and windows due to bomb and air mine impacts in the immediate vicinity. It almost fell victim to a bombing raid in the morning hours of 20 July 1944. An incendiary bomb had fallen directly in front of the south entrance to the church. The fire that broke out was extinguished by the then pastor Busch during the attack.

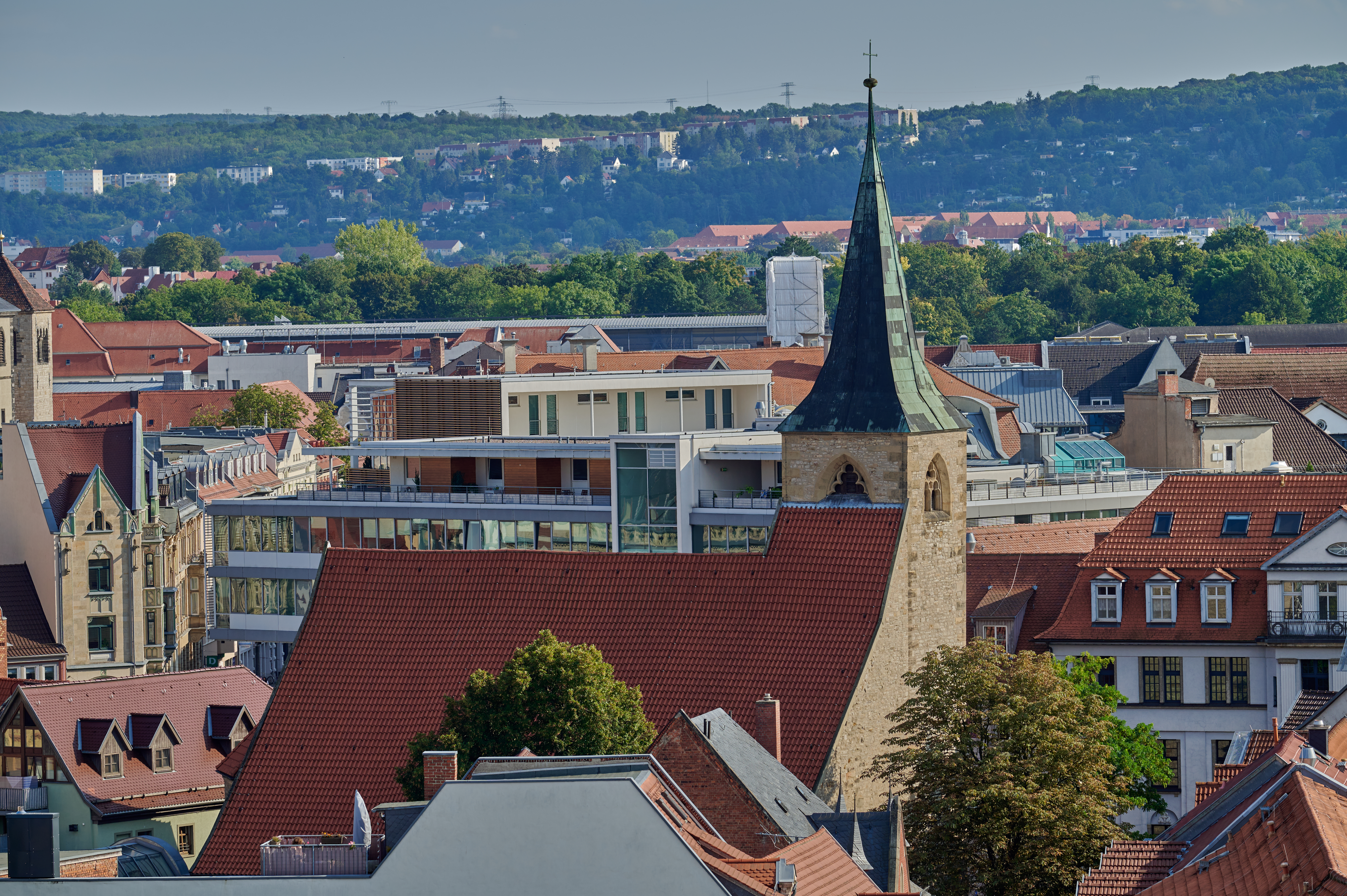
View from St Giles' Church

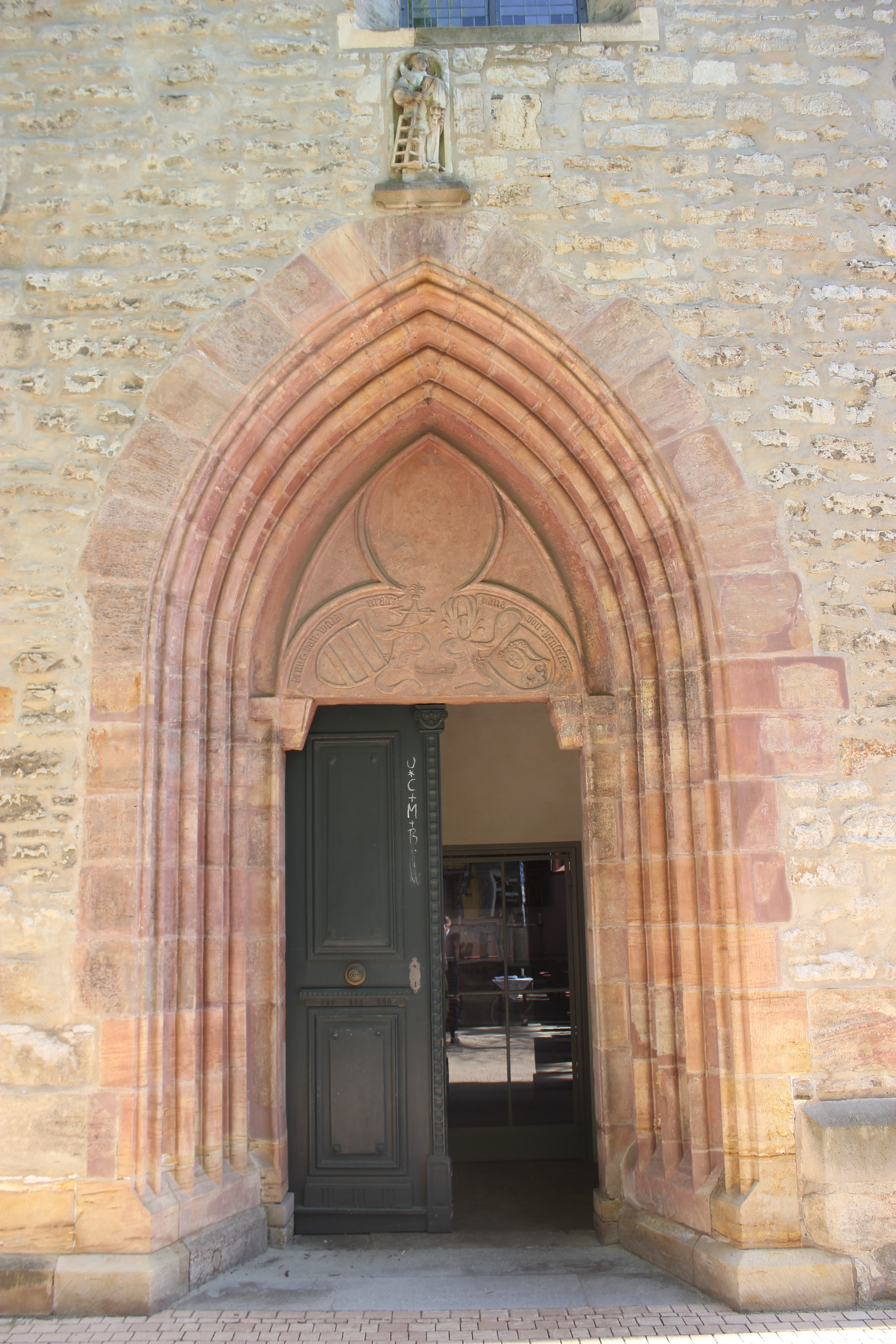
The portal

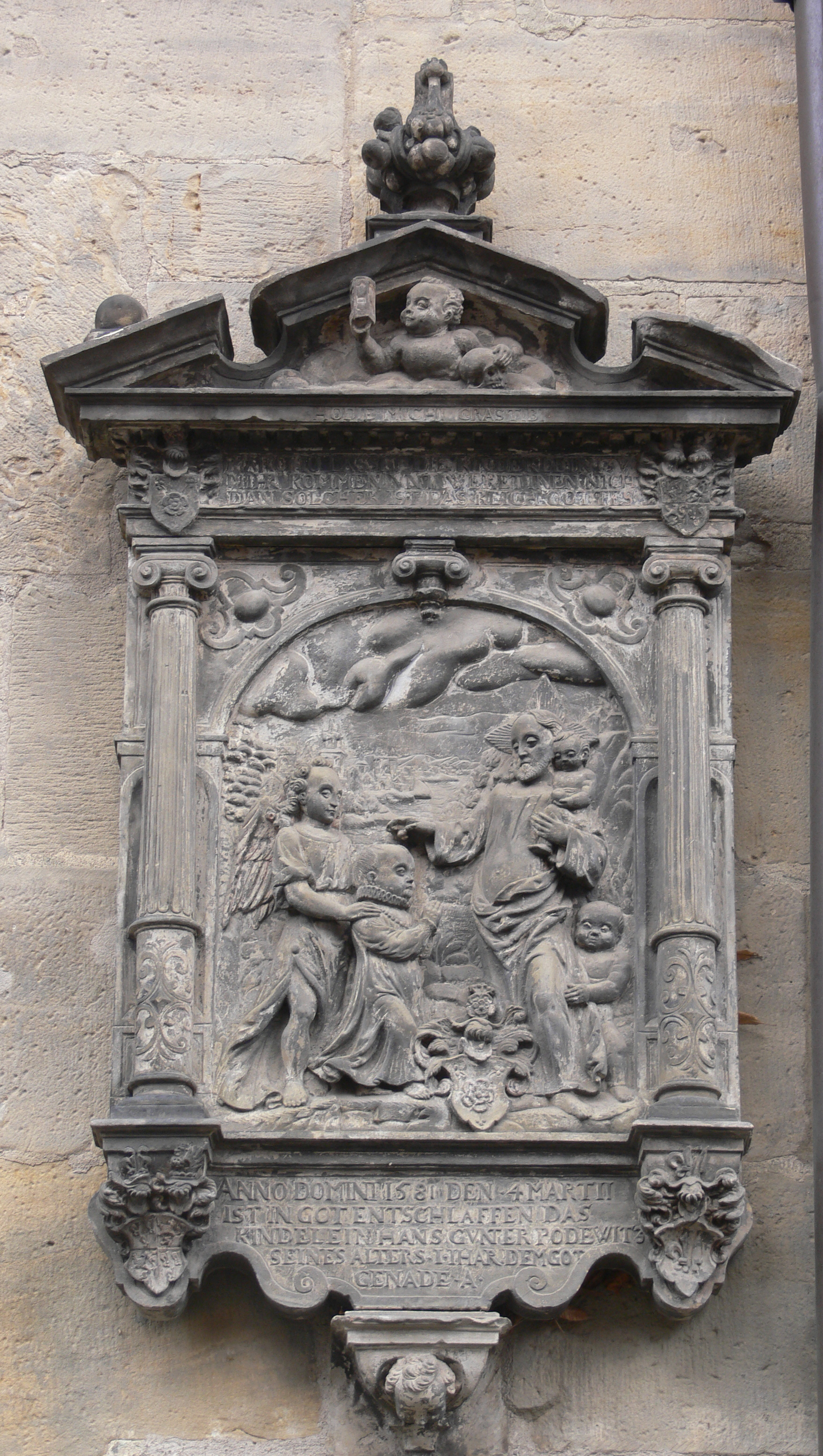
An epitaph

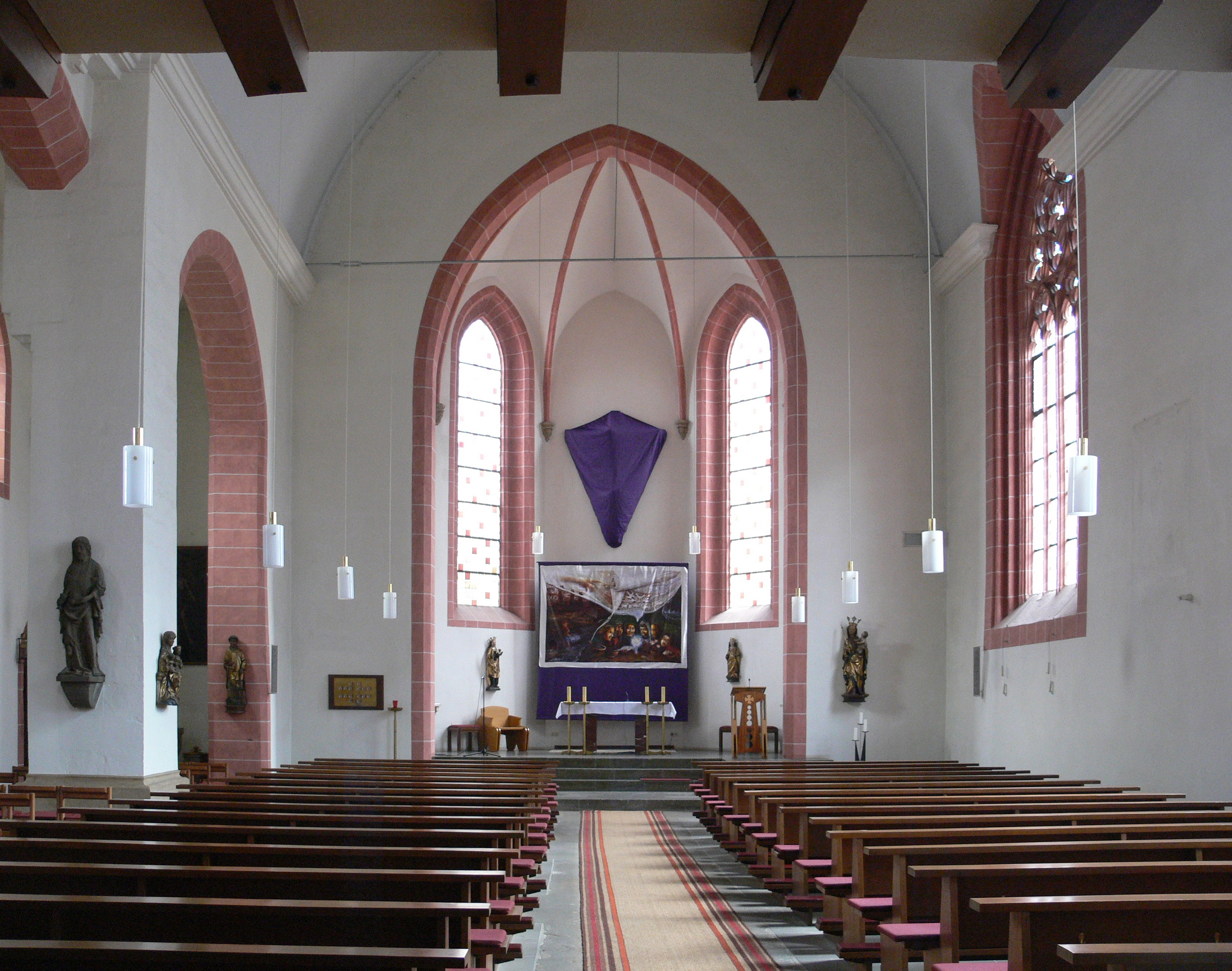
Interior view

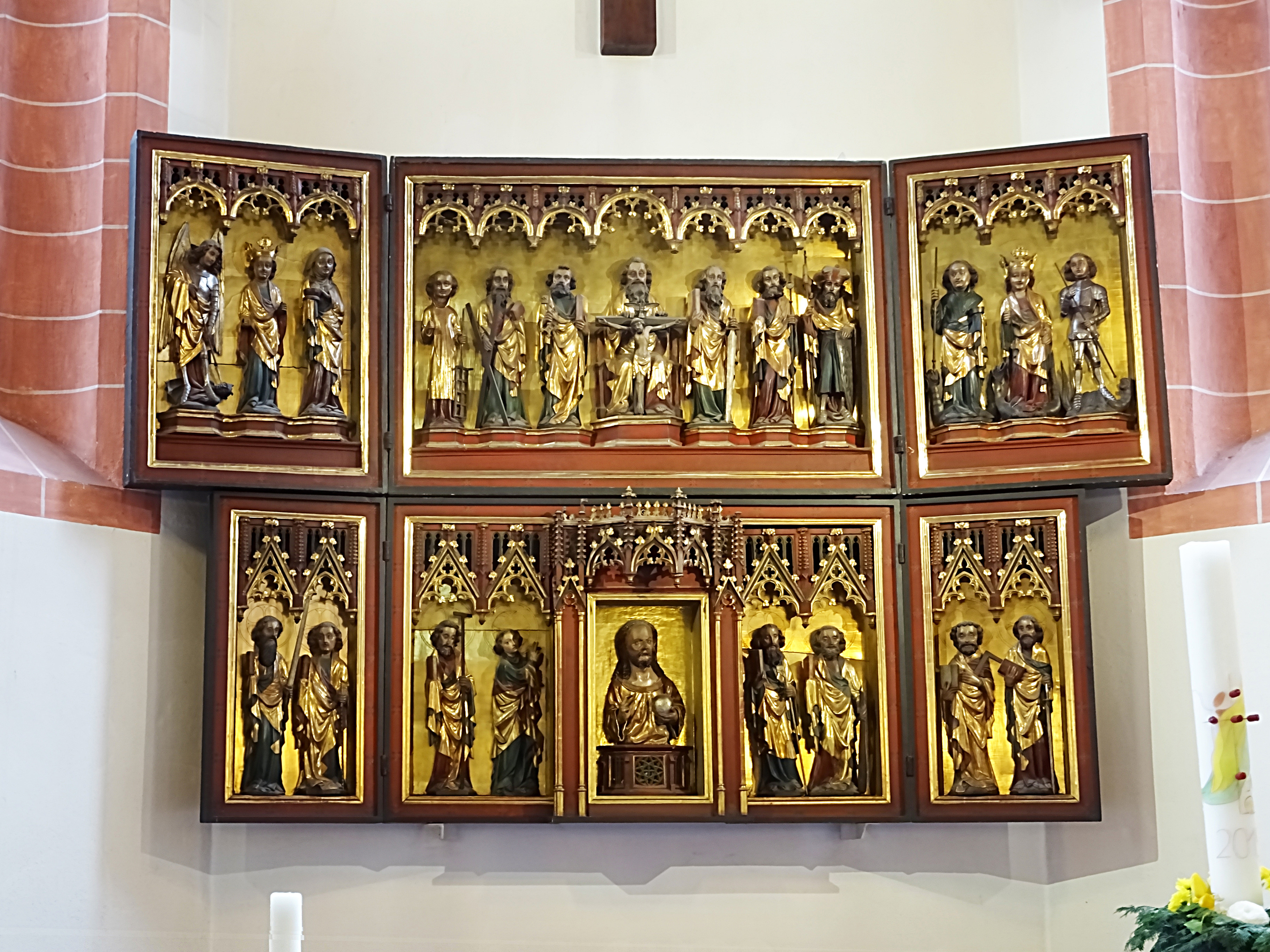
The winged altar

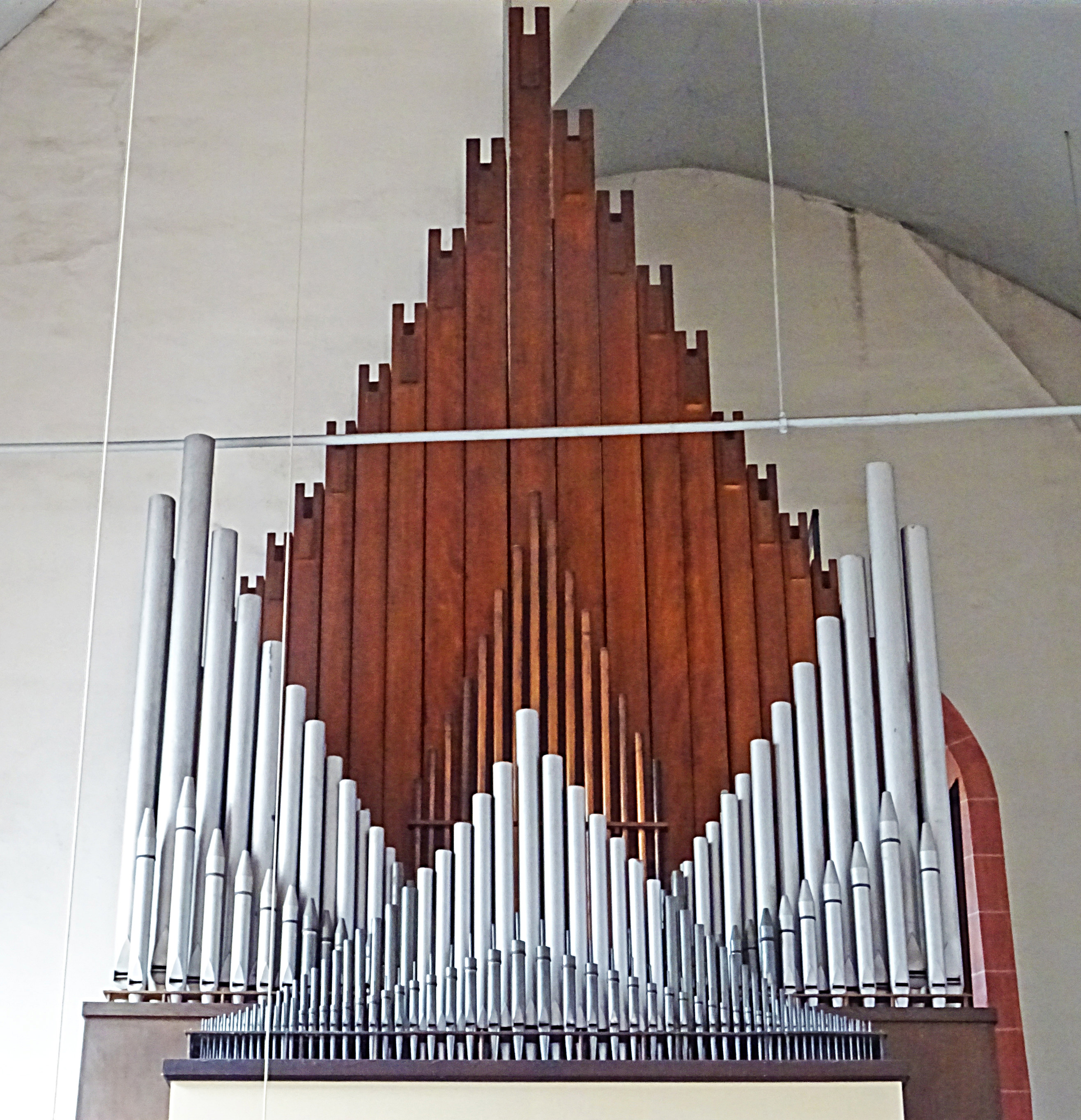
The organ

== Political activity in GDR times ==
As the first church in the former GDR, oecumenical peace prayers had already been held in St Lawrence's Church since 1978. On 9 November 2019, a plaque was placed on the wall facing Schlösserstraße. It reminds that the first prayers were directed "against the introduction of military education in schools by the Socialist Unity Party dictatorship of the time". In October 1989, the church was also the starting point of a first procession of 70 people to St. Andrew's Church, directly opposite the Bezirk (district) administration of the Ministry for State Security ("Stasi"). This quickly developed into the Thursday demonstrations in Erfurt at the time of the Peaceful Revolution with tens of thousands of participants.
