= Filial church =

Church to which is dependent on another church

A filial church, in the Roman Catholic Church, is a church to which is annexed the cure of souls, but which remains dependent on another church. The term comes from the Latin filialis, from filia, “daughter”.

== Description ==
The term filial church may have more than one signification as to minor details. Ordinarily, a filial church is a parish church which has been constituted by the dismemberment of an older parish. Its rector is really a parish priest, having all the essential rights of such a dignity, but still bound to defer in certain matters to the pastor of the mother church. The marks of deference required are not so fixed that local custom may not change them. Such marks are: obtaining the baptismal water from the mother church, making a moderate offering of money (fixed by the bishop) to the parish priest of the mother church annually, and occasionally during the year assisting with his parishioners in a body at services in the older church. In some places this last includes a procession and the presentation of a wax candle. If the filial church has been endowed from the revenues of the mother church, the parish priest of the latter has the right of presentation when a pastor for the dependent church is to be appointed.

This term is also applied to churches established within the limits of an extensive parish, without any dismemberment of the parochial territory. The Pastor of such a filial church is really only a curate or assistant of the parish priest of the mother church, and he is removable at will, except in cases where he has a benefice. The parish priest may retain to himself the right of performing baptism, assisting at marriages and similar offices in the filial church, or he may ordain that such functions be performed only in the parish church, restricting the services in the filial church to Mass and Vespers. In practice, however, the curates of such filial churches act as parish priests for their districts, although by canon law the dependence upon the pastor of the mother church remains of obligation, though all outward manifestation of subjection has ceased.

In the union of two parishes in the manner called "union by subjection", the less important of the parish churches may sink into a condition scarcely distinguishable from that of a filial church and be comprehended under this term. In other words, the parish priest may govern such a church by giving it over to one of his assistants. The subjected church does not lose its parochial rights, yet its dependence on the parish priest of another church and its administration by a vicar has led to its being included loosely under the designation filial church.

Historically, this term has also been applied to those churches, often in different countries, founded by other and greater churches. In this sense the major patriarchical Sees of Rome, Antioch, Jerusalem, Alexandria, Constantinople established many filial churches which retained a special dependence upon the church founding them.

== See also ==
- Chapel of ease
