= Kulturdenkmal =

German term for a site of cultural heritage

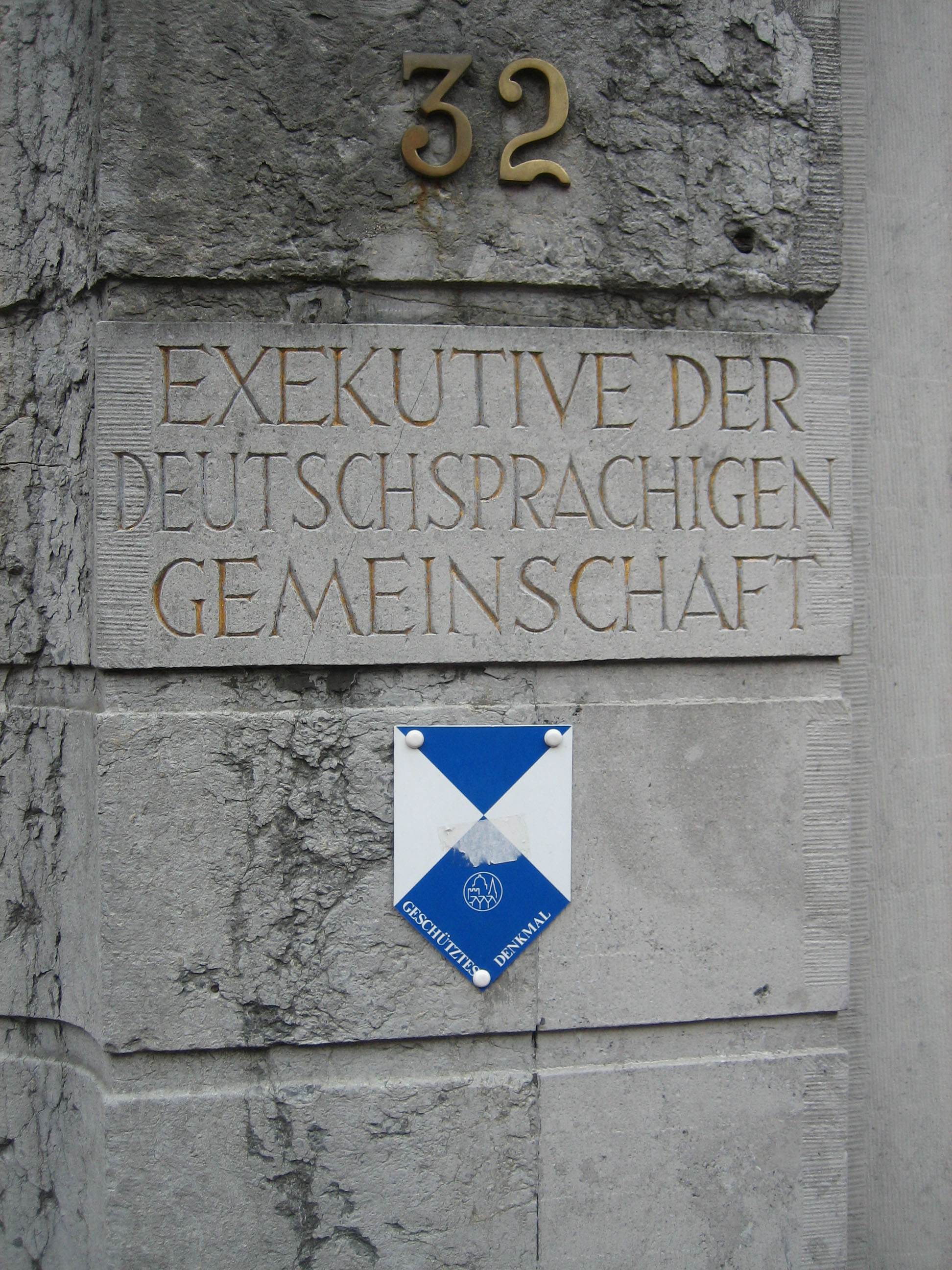
Pillar outside the Council of the German Speaking Community of Belgium, which is housed in a Kulturdenkmal, marked with the emblem of the Hague Convention of 1954 with text "Geschütztes Denkmal", used to mark protected buildings and other structures in the German Speaking Community of Belgium.

Kulturdenkmal (German: [kʊlˈtuːɐ̯dɛŋkˌmaːl]) is the official term to describe National Heritage Sites listed by law in German-speaking areas of Europe, to protect and spread awareness of cultural heritage.

== Austria ==
In Austria, the Bundesdenkmalamt (BDA), the institution in charge of the National Heritage Sites, administers the list of Kulturdenkmal objects, which it formally refers to as Denkmalgeschützte Objekte.

== Belgium ==
The Institut du Patrimoine is the institution in charge of the National Heritage Sites of Wallonia, which includes the National Heritage Sites of the German-speaking Community of Belgium. Various local websites with public information are maintained, and various initiatives are undertaken to assist owners of protected properties and to increase public awareness, most notably the European Heritage Days, which are called "Tage des offenen Denkmals".

== Germany ==
As cultural matters lie largely within the responsibility not of the national government, but of the 16 states (Bundesländer), the 16 respective heritage protection authorities (Landesdenkmalämter) survey and list official monuments.

== Switzerland ==
The Kulturgüterschutz is the institution in charge of the National Heritage Sites of the German-speaking areas of Switzerland. They maintain the inventory of protected objects and also organize the European Heritage Days, which are called Europäischer Tag des Denkmals.

== Emblems ==
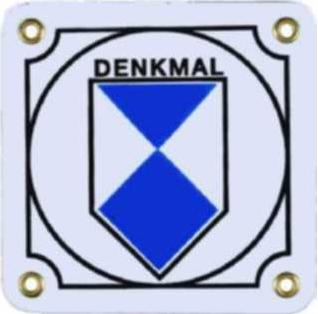
Emblem used to mark protected buildings and other structures in Germany.

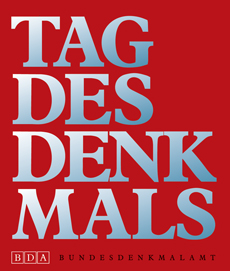
Logo for the European Heritage Days, which are organized by the DSD and are called Tag des Denkmals in Austria.

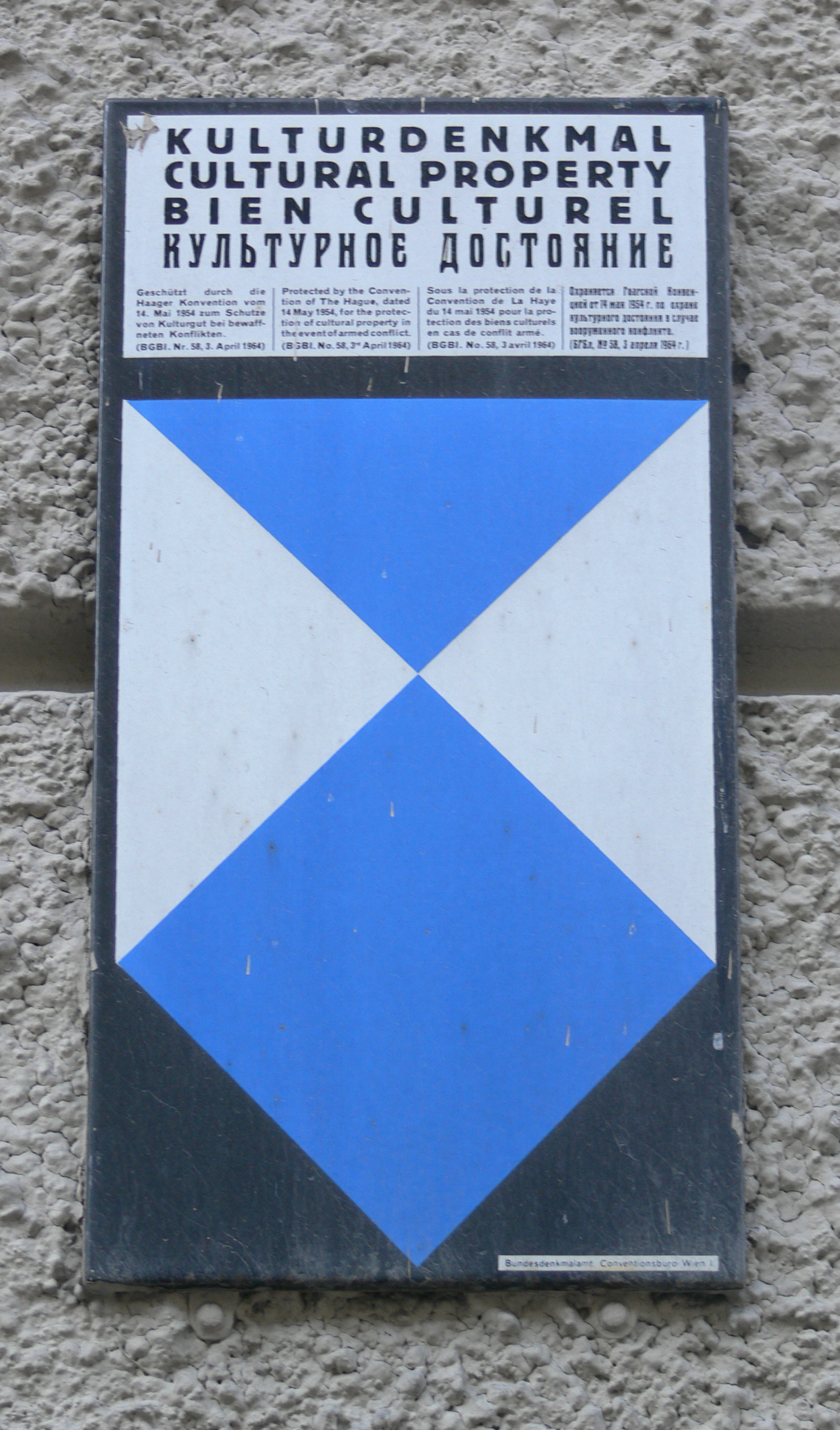
"Cultural property" in four languages, including "Kulturdenkmal".
