= Oliver Drechsel =

German classical pianist

Oliver Drechsel (born 10 May 1973) is a German concert pianist and composer.

== Life ==
Drechsel was born in Langenfeld (Rheinland). After initial lessons with his mother, the concert pianist Ruth Drechsel-Püster, he studied at the Hochschule für Musik Köln with Roswitha Gediga-Glombitza and Pavel Gililov. Master classes with, among others, Peter Feuchtwanger, Karl-Heinz Kämmerling and the Alban Berg Quartet complemented this education, which he completed in 1998 with the Konzertexamen. In the same year he released his debut CD "Jürg Baur - Das Klavierwerk" and received the Culture Prize of the Sparkassen-Kulturstiftung Rheinland (support prize). For his compositions he received, among others, the 1st prize of the 2007 Siegburg Composition Competition.

Drechsel is dedicated to the performance of 18th and 19th century piano music on original historical instruments from the Dohr Collection (Cologne). This includes piano works by the composers Ferdinand Hiller, Friedrich Kiel, Christian Gottlob Neefe, Christian Heinrich Rinck and Johann Wilhelm Wilms, most of which are world premiere recordings.

In addition to solo performances at home and abroad (including in the "Best of NRW" series) as well as radio recordings and CD productions, a further focus of his pianistic work lies in the field of chamber music, in which he performs with Christoph Lahme (harmonium) as a "liaison extraordinaire" as well as with Gernot Süßmuth (violin) and Dagmar Spengler (cello) as the "Piano Trio Cologne-Weimar". In 2003, Drechsel was artist in residence at the Rinck Festival Cologne.

Drechsel teaches music and mathematics at the Otto-Hahn-Gymnasium in his home town Monheim am Rhein as well as piano at the Hochschule für Musik Köln.

Most of his work (CDs, books, sheet music) is published by Verlag Dohr.

== Recordings ==
- on concert grand Ibach:
  - Jürg Baur: Das Klavierwerk, Telos Records 024, 1998.
- on concert grand Steinway & Sons:
  - Jürg Baur: mit wechselndem schlüssel. Klavierlieder (zus. m. Matthias Güdelhöfer, bass-baritone), Verlag Dohr, DCD018, 2001.
  - dialogo. 20th century works for violoncello and piano by Sergei Prokofiev, Buxton Orr and Benjamin Britten (together with Dagmar Spengler, cello), Verlag Dohr DCD017, 2001.
  - fantasia. Piano fantasies by Carl Philipp Emanuel Bach, Wolfgang Amadeus Mozart, Frédéric Chopin, Sergei Rachmaninoff and Franz Schubert, Verlag Dohr DCD007, 2001.
  - Christian Gottlob Neefe: XII Piano Sonatas, Ludwig van Beethoven: Electoral Sonatas, Verlag Dohr DCD027, 2006/07.
  - Stockholm@Köln: Neue Kammermusik für Fagott und Klavier, together with Berthold Große (bassoon), works by Oliver Drechsel, Andreas Herkenrath and Johan Ullén, arcantus, arc19018, 2019.
  - Liaison extraordinaire: Beethoven, together with Christoph Lahme (harmonium), works by Ludwig van Beethoven, Oliver Drechsel and Sigfrid Karg-Elert, VDE Gallo CD1621, 2020.
- on concert grand Theodor Stöcker, Berlin 1868 (Haus Eller):
  - Friedrich Kiel, Das Klavierwerk Vol. 1, Verlag Dohr DCD009, 2002.
  - Friedrich Kiel, Das Klavierwerk Vol. 2 (together with Wilhelm Kemper), Verlag Dohr DCD011, 2003.
  - Friedrich Kiel, Das Klavierwerk Vol. 3 (together with Wilhelm Kemper), Verlag Dohr, DCD013, 2004.
  - Friedrich Kiel, Das Klavierwerk Vol. 4 (together with Wilhelm Kemper), Verlag Dohr, DCD023, 2007.
- On fortepiano Christian Erdmann Rancke, Riga 1825 (Haus Eller):
  - Johann Christian Heinrich Rinck, Das Klavierwerk Vol. 1 (publisher Dohr, DCD018, 2002).
  - Johann Christian Heinrich Rinck, The Piano Works Vol. 2 (together with Egino Klepper; publisher Dohr, DCD019, 2003)
  - Johann Wilhelm Wilms, Works for Piano Solo Vol. 1 (publisher Dohr, DCD024, 2004)
  - Johann Wilhelm Wilms, Works for Piano Solo Vol. 2 with narrator Claus Biederstaedt (publisher Dohr, DCD029, 2007)
- on clavichord Wilhelm Heinrich Bethmann 1799 (copy J. C. Neupert, Bamberg 1999 (Haus Eller)):
  - Christian Gottlob Neefe: XII Piano Sonatas, Ludwig van Beethoven: Electoral Sonatas, Verlag Dohr DCD026, 2006/07.
- on grand piano Broadwood 1865 (Haus Eller):
  - Ferdinand Hiller: Piano sonatas 1-3 and youth sonatas, Verlag Dohr DCD039, 2021

== Publications ==
- as author:
  - Jürg Baur: Das Klavierwerk. Verlag Dohr 1998 (ISBN 3-925366-60-1)
- as editor:
  - Jürg Baur: Drei frühe Klavierstücke (1943/60). Verlag Dohr 1998 (ISMN 979-0-2020-0507-1)
  - Jürg Baur: Werkverzeichnis. Verlag Dohr 2000 (ISBN 3-925366-59-8)
  - Jürg Baur: Annotationen zur Musik. Ausgewählte Schriften, Aufsätze und Vorträge. Verlag Dohr 2003 (ISBN 3-936655-01-4)
  - Johann Wilhelm Wilms: Klavierwerke Vol. 1 (with CD). Denkmäler Rheinischer Musik Vol. 25, Verlag Dohr 2005 (ISMN 979-0-2020-1120-1)
  - Daniel Friedrich Eduard Wilsing: Sonate für Pianoforte und Violine (1832). First edition. Verlag Dohr 2005 (ISMN 979-0-2020-1160-7)
