= Dagmar Spengler =

German classical cellist

Dagmar Spengler (born 4 April 1974) is a German cellist. She is currently the solo cellist of the Staatskapelle Weimar.

== Life ==
Born in Herten, Spengler received her first cello lessons at the Marl music school with Zoltan Thirring and Klaus Baumeister and subsequently studied with Claus Kanngiesser at the Hochschule für Musik Köln. After her artistic maturity examination in 1998, which she passed "with distinction", she accepted an invitation from Bernard Greenhouse to spend a year studying in the US. As a scholarship holder of the Deutscher Musikwettbewerb in Bonn with the Rebecca Clarke Trio (piano trio), she performed numerous concerts from 1998 onwards as part of the Concerts of Young Artists of the Deutscher Musikrat. In 2001 she completed her studies at the Cologne University of Music with the Konzertexamen.

Spengler was solo cellist in several youth orchestras (including the Youth Symphony Orchestra of North Rhine-Westphalia), played as solo cellist in the "Folkwang Chamber Orchestra Essen" and, immediately after her studies, was cellist in the Staatskapelle Dresden between 2001 and 2003 (Semper Opera).

In addition to regularly attending international master classes with, among others, David Geringas, Bernard Greenhouse, Lluís Claret and the Alban Berg Quartet, she devotes herself intensively to chamber music in a wide variety of formations, for example with the sextet Vivace! and in duo with the pianist Oliver Drechsel.

Under the title dialogo with works of the 20th century for violoncello and piano, her debut CD was released in 2001 by Verlag Dohr, which contains the well-known sonatas by Sergei Prokofiev and Benjamin Britten as well as two world premiere recordings by the British composer Buxton Orr, including his Carmen Fantasy.

== Recording ==
- Dialogo. 20th century works for violoncello and piano by Sergei Prokofiev, Buxton Orr and Benjamin Britten (with Oliver Drechsel, piano), Verlag Dohr DCD017, 2001.
