= Johann Christian Kittel =

German pipe organist and composer (1732–1809)

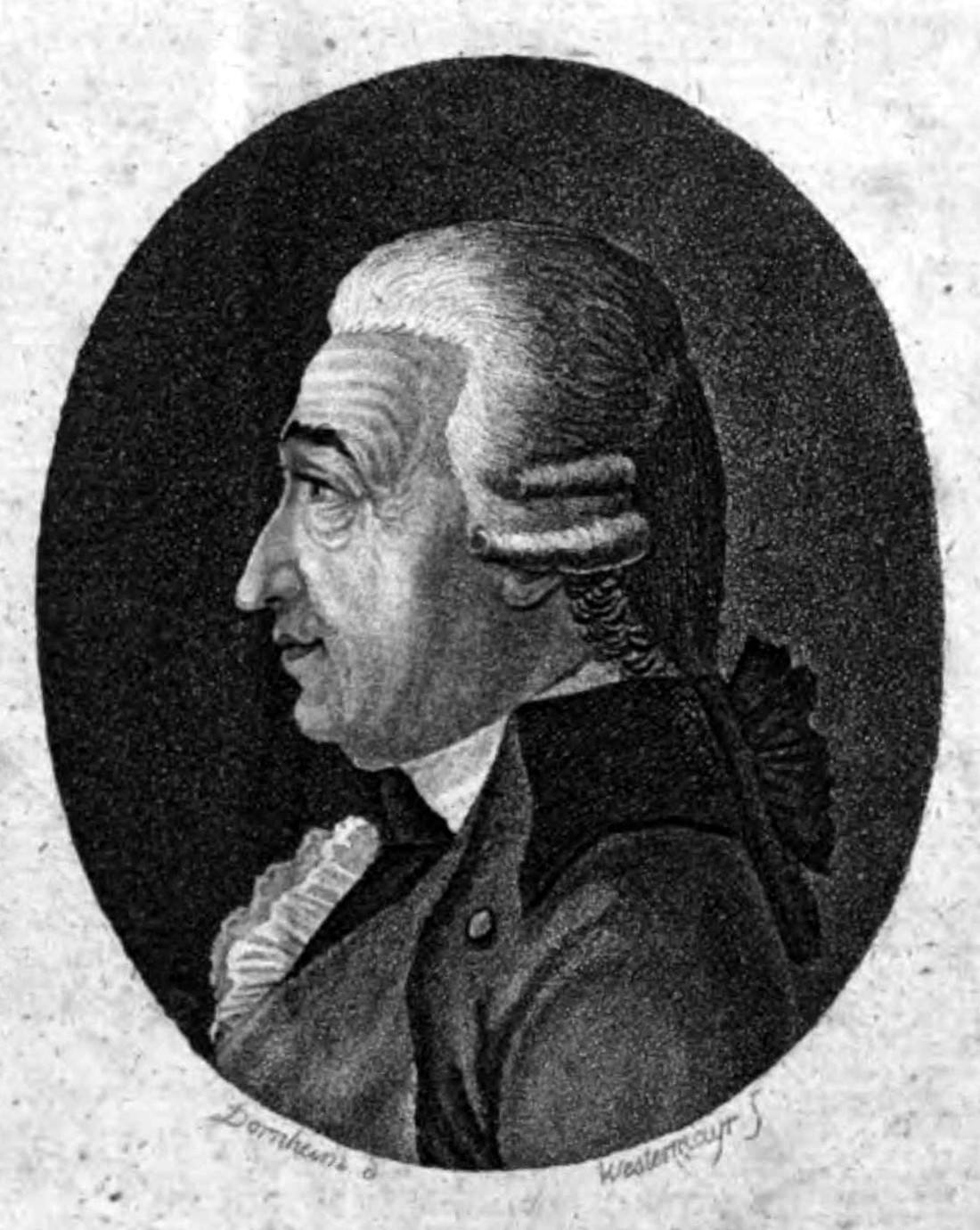
Johann Christian Kittel

Johann Christian Kittel (18 February 1732 – 17 April 1809) was a German organist, composer, and teacher. He was one of the last students of Johann Sebastian Bach. His students included Michael Gotthard Fischer, Karl Gottlieb Umbreit, Johann Wilhelm Hässler and Christian Heinrich Rinck. See: List of music students by teacher: K to M#Johann Christian Kittel.

== Biography ==
Kittel was born and died in Erfurt. He first studied with Jakob Adlung. He moved to Leipzig in 1748 and was a favourite – and the last – pupil of Johann Sebastian Bach until Bach's death two years later. He was appointed organist and teacher in Langensalza in 1751, following which he returned to Erfurt as organist of the Barfüßerkirche, in 1756, moving to the Predigerkirche in 1762.

He refused many generous and more munificent offers, including one in 1790 from Duchess Anna Amalia of Brunswick-Wolfenbüttel to travel to Italy, remaining in Erfurt for the rest of his life. He played many evening recitals there and was famous as a virtuoso organist. Goethe, Herder, and Wieland all went to hear him play, and he made a concert tour to Hamburg in 1800, remaining there for a year while preparing a book of chorales for Schleswig-Holstein.

== Compositions ==
He considered himself to be "grounded in the principles of Bach" and aimed "to awaken, maintain and heighten feelings of devotion in the hearts of his hearers by means of music". His teaching and composition fulfilled this aim by a restriction to simple forms which were best suited to liturgical use. He wrote some large-scale organ works such as double chorale variations based on Bach's examples, though he was influenced by the contemporary galant style, with a strong emphasis on melody. His piano sonatas of 1789 have features in common with the Viennese classical school.

=== Piano ===
- 6 Sonaten ... nebst einer Fantasie (Gera, 1789)
- 6 Veränderungen, über ... Nicht so traurig (Saint Petersburg, 1797)

=== Organ ===
- Der angehende praktische Organist, oder Anweisung zum zweckmässigen Gebrauch der Orgel bei Gottesverehrungen in Beispielen, textbook, 3 volumes (Erfurt, 1801–1808)
- Vierstimmige Choräle mit Vorspielen ... für die Schleswig-Hollsteinischen Kirchen, 2 volumes (Altona, 1803)
- 24 Choräle mit 8 verschiedenen Bässen über eine Melodie, ed. J. C. H. Rinck (Offenbach, 1811)
- Grosse Präludien, 2 volumes (Leipzig)
- 24 kurze Choralvorspiele (Offenbach)
- Variationen über 2 Choräle (Leipzig)
- 24 leichte Choral-Vorspiele (Bonn and Cologne)

== Sources ==
- Karl Gustav Fellerer (2001). "Kittel, Johann Christian". Grove Music Online (8th ed.). Oxford University Press. doi:10.1093/gmo/9781561592630.article.15081. ISBN 978-1-56159-263-0. (subscription required)
