= Christian Heinrich Rinck =

German composer and organist (1770–1846)

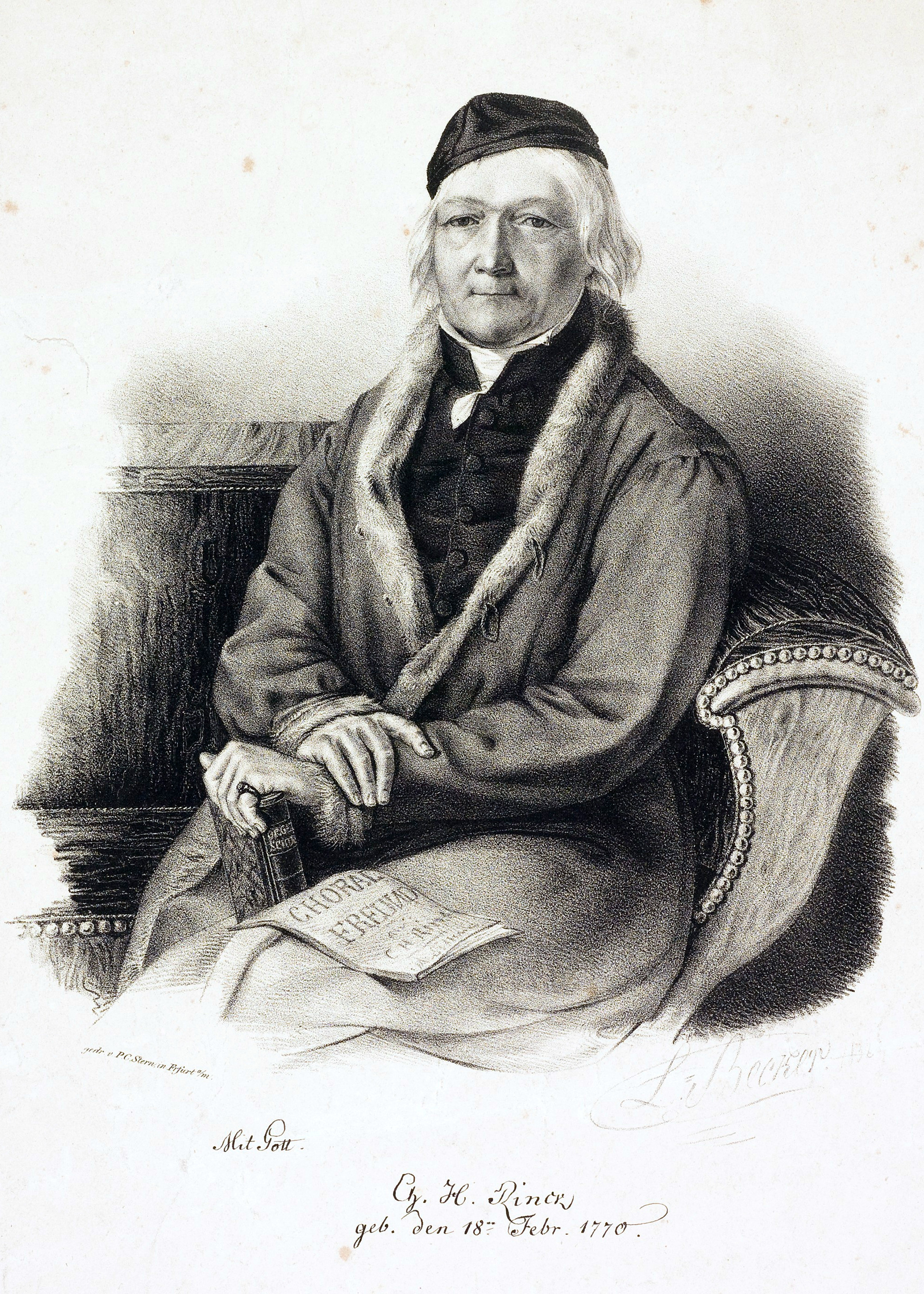
Christian Heinrich Rinck

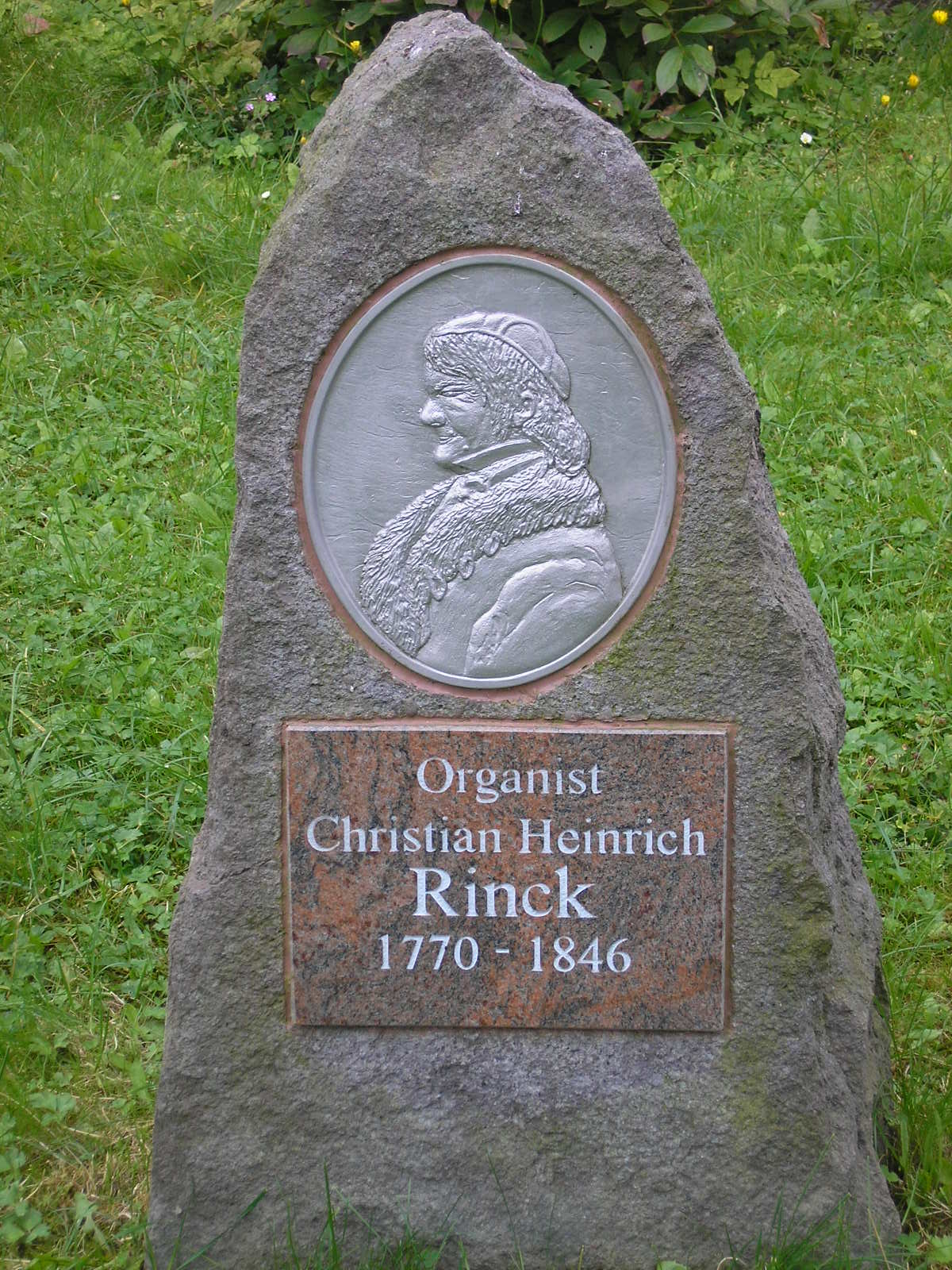
Tombstone of Rinck in Elgersburg

Johann Christian Heinrich Rinck (18 February 1770 – 7 August 1846) was a German composer and organist of the late classical and early romantic eras.

== Life and career ==
Rinck was born in Elgersburg (in present-day Thuringia), and died in Darmstadt, aged 76.

He studied with Johann Christian Kittel (1732–1809), (a pupil of Johann Sebastian Bach), and eventually became Kantor at the music school in Darmstadt, where he was also a court organist from 1813. He composed prolifically, and an organ primer of his enjoyed wide popularity.

Among his works is a set of Variations on ‘Ah! vous dirai-je, Maman’, Opus 90, published by Simrock in 1828. It is based on a tune made familiar by Mozart (K. 265) (and generally associated with the words Twinkle Twinkle Little Star).

Notable students include composer Georg Vierling and Benedict Jucker (1811–1876). See: List of music students by teacher: R to S#Christian Heinrich Rinck.

== Works ==
=== Piano works ===
- XXX zweistimmige Übungen durch alle Tonarten (30 Exercices à deux parties dans tous les tons) op. 67. Verlag Dohr
- Neuausgabe der Klaviervariationen, krit. rev. Neuausgabe.

Heft 1: Freut euch des Lebens op. 39; Das Vögelchen op. 61; Brüder lagert euch im Kreise op. 44; Heft 2: Zieht ihr Krieger, zieht von dannen op. 51; Zu Steffen sprach im Traume op. 62; Heft 3: Andante con Variatione o.op. (1798) für Pianoforte oder Clavichord. Verlag Dohr

- Deux Sonates pour Piano=Forte à quatre mains op. 50 F-Dur und op. 86 B-Dur („d’une difficulté progressive“). Verlag Dohr
- Six Menuets et Trios pour Pianoforte à quatre mains op. 13. Verlag Dohr
- Douze Menuets et Trios op. 79 (Klav. 4hd.) Verlag Dohr
- Trois Sonates à quatre mains op. 26. Verlag Dohr
- Trois Divertissements (d’une difficulté progressive) op. 36. (Klav. 4hd.) Verlag Dohr
- Trois Divertissements à quatre mains d’une difficulté progressive op. 41. Verlag Dohr
- Variationen op. 102: Fünf Variationen über die Cavatine „Nach soviel Leiden“ von Rossini op. 102,1; Fünf Variationen über das Volkslied „Es kann ja nicht immer so bleiben“ op. 102,2 (Klav. 4hd.). Verlag Dohr

=== Chamber music ===
- Klaviertrio Es-Dur o.op. (1803) für Violine, Violoncello und Klavier. Verlag Dohr
- Drei Klaviertrios op. 32 (1812) für Violine, Violoncello („ad libitum“) und Klavier. Verlag Dohr
- Drei Klaviertrios op. 34 (1834) für Violine, Violoncello („obligés“) und Klavier. Verlag Dohr
- Sonate G-Dur für Flöte und Klavier (nach dem „Flötenkonzert“ für Orgel aus op. 55, 5. Band Nr. 8), arrangiert von Oliver Drechsel. Verlag Dohr
- Sonate très facile für Violine und Klavier (Cembalo) Nr. 1 B-Dur. Verlag Dohr
- Sonate très facile für Violine und Klavier (Cembalo) Nr. 2 G-Dur. Verlag Dohr
- Drei Sestetti. (Erstdruck). Verlag Dohr

=== Organ works ===
- Kleine und leichte Orgelstücke, op. 1
- Zwölf kurze und leichte Orgelstücke, op. 2
- 24 Trios op 20
- Douze Preludes pour l’orgue, op. 25
- Zwölf Orgelstücke, op. 29
- Concertstuck, op. 33
- 40 Kleine, leichte und vermischte Orgelpräludien, op. 37
- 12 fugirte Nachspiele für Orgel, op. 48
- Praktische Orgelschule, op. 55
- Variations on a Theme by Corelli, op. 56
- 12 Adagios for Organ, op.57
- Andante with Eight Variations, op.70
- Drei Nachspiele für die Orgel, op. 78
- Neun Variationen und Finale, op. 90
- Der Choralfreund, op.110
- 15 leichte fugierte Nachspiele, op. 114
- Exercise and 6 Grand Pieces, op.120
- Sammlung von Vor- und Nachspielen zum Gebrauche beim öffentlichen Gottesdienste, op. 129

=== Vocal works ===
- Sechs geistliche Lieder für Gesang und Orgel (oder Klavier) op. 81. Verlag Dohr
- Messe/Missa op. 91 (lateinischer und deutscher Text) für Chor, Soli (ad libitum) und Orgel. Edition Musica Rinata und Verlag Dohr
- Herr, ich bleibe stets an Dir. Psalm 73. Motette zu vier Singstimmen (Chor u. Soli) mit obligater Orgelbegleitung op. 127. Edition Musica Rinata und Verlag Dohr
- Gebet für Verstorbene op. 71. Motette zu vier Singstimmen (Chor u. Soli) und obligater Orgelbegleitung. Verlag Dohr
- Charfreytags-Kantate für Soli, Chor und Orgel op. 76. Verlag Dohr
- Befiehl dem Herrn deine Wege op. 85. Motette für Soli, Chor und Orgel. Edition Musica Rinata und Verlag Dohr
- Lobe den Herrn meine Seele. Motette zu vier Singstimmen (Chor u. Soli) und obligater Orgelbegleitung op. 88. Edition Musica Rinata und Verlag Dohr
- Gott sey uns gnädig und segne uns! Motette für Soli, Chor und Orgel op. 109. Verlag Dohr
- Halleluja von Pfeffel op. 63. Motette für Sopran, Alt, Tenor und Bass mit Begleitung des Pianoforte. Verlag Dohr
- Das Vater unser für Sopran, Alt, Tenor, Bass und obligate Orgel. Edition Musica Rinata und Verlag Dohr
- Weihnachtskantate op. 73. Edition Musica Rinata
- Gott sorgt für uns op. 98 Kantate für Chor und Orgel. Edition Musica Rinata
- Preis und Anbetung sei unserm Gott!
