= Wolfgang Hildemann =

German composer and music teacher (1925–1995)

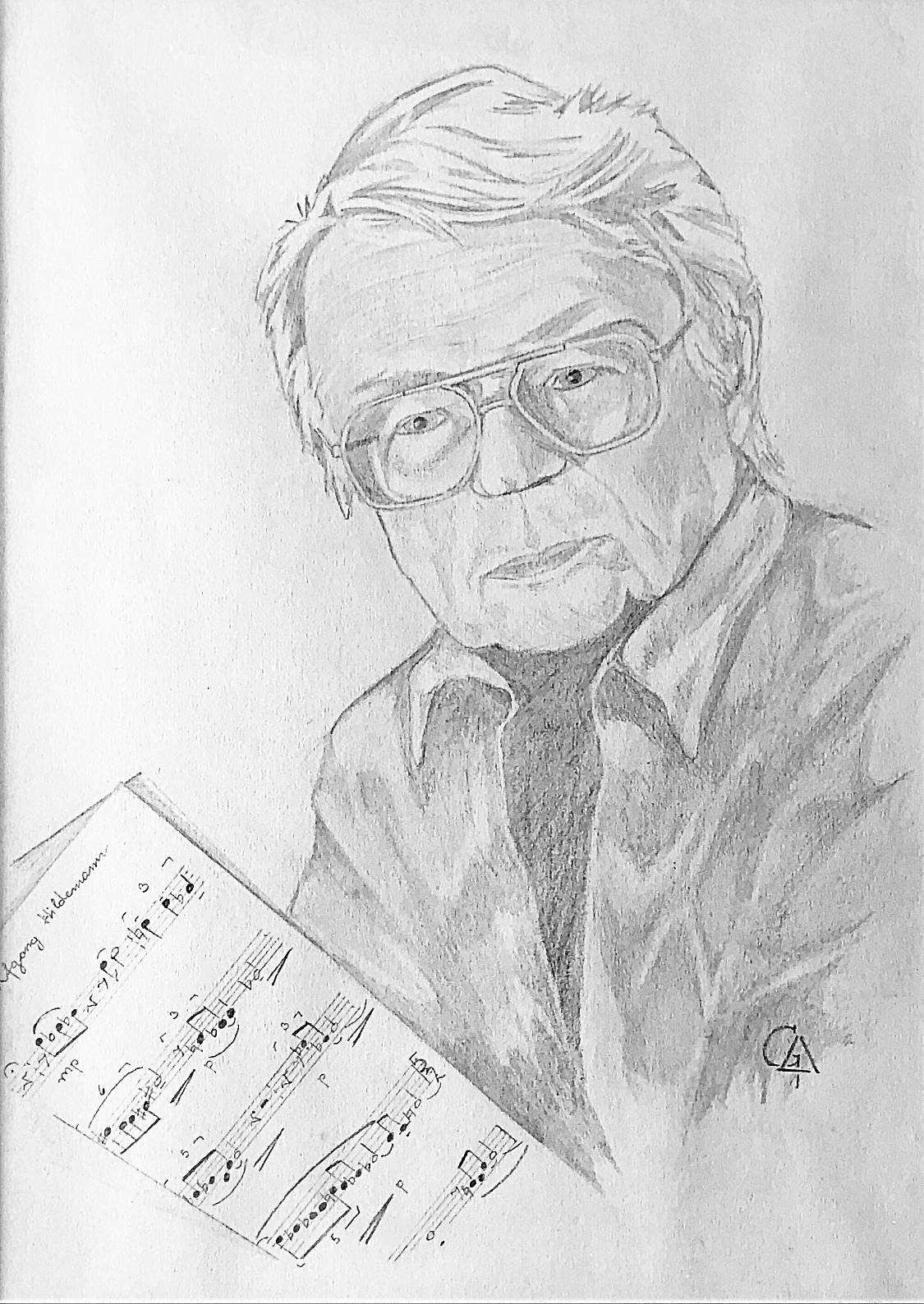
German composer Wolfgang Hildemann

Wolfgang Hildemann (June 17, 1925 — August 25, 1995 in Düsseldorf) was a German composer and music teacher who is known for the use of the twelve-tone technique.

== Life and education ==
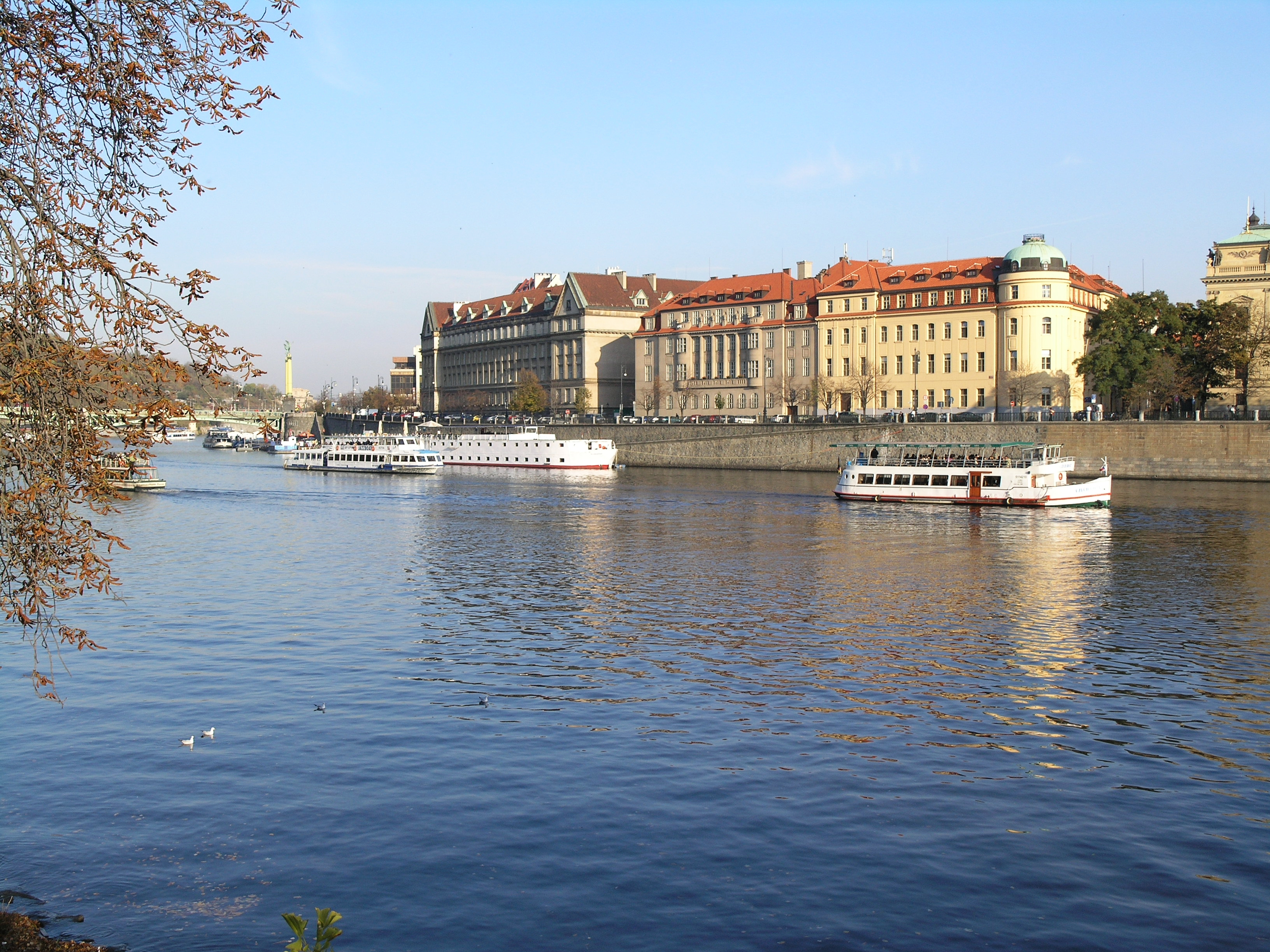
Musical Conservatory in Prague

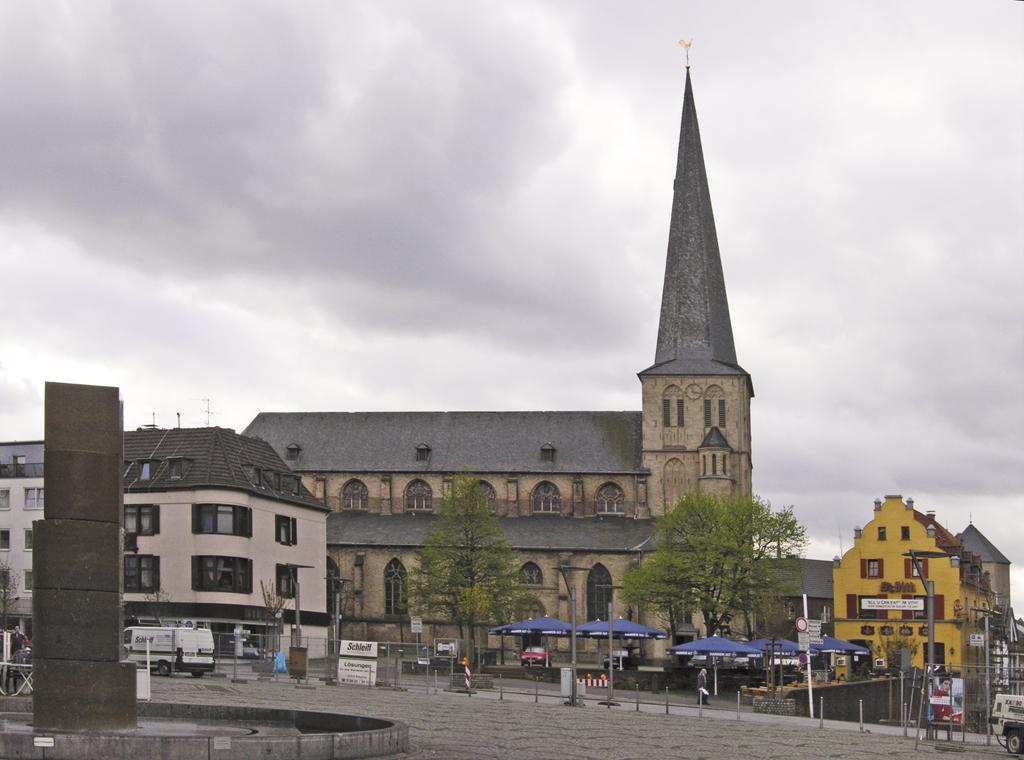
Sankt Maria Himmelfahrt Church in Mönchengladbach

Hildemann was born on June 17, 1925, in the city of Cheb (formerly known as Eger or Egerland) which was part of the contentious German Sudetenland. Following World War Two, Hildemann studied at the music conservatories in Prague and Nürnberg. Among his professors were Fidelio Finke, Anton Nowakowski and Joseph Keilberth.

Succeeding his studies in Nürnberg, Hildemann passed the examination to become a chapel master in 1952. Between 1949 and 1967, he worked as the musical instructor of the Windsbacher Knabenchor (Windsbach Boys’ Choir). From 1962 on, he taught at the Odenwaldschule in Oberhambach, a private boarding school following a concept of progressive education after World War Two.

After moving to Mönchengladbach, he continued teaching music in school at the Hugo Junkers-Gymnasium. Once settled down in Mönchengladbach, Hildemann became a professor and frequent lecture in church music and composition at the University of Applied Sciences Niederrhein (Rhineland). He further lead the musical branch at the Esslingen Künstlergilde, a group of artists. The majority of the music that ended up being published was composed during his time in Mönchengladbach.

== Selected compositions ==
=== From 1975 to 1995 ===
- 1975 Kleine Orgelmesse, OCLC 724463476
- 1976 Ritmi Dispari, Schott Musik
- 1980 Diletto musicale, Breitkopf & Härtel
- 1984 Et facta ora sexta, Musikverlag Christoph Dohr
- 1990 Liber organi bavarese, Musikverlag Christoph Dohr
- 1990 Propriums Messe, Musikverlag Christoph Dohr
- 1990 Recitativo, Aria e Toccata
- 1991 Cinque Pastorelli
- 1991 Concerti bavarese, Musikverlag Christoph Dohr

=== Posthumous ===
- 2003 Klassische Ohrwürmer (Classical Catchy Tunes), Edition Tonger

== Style ==
Hildemann worked with the Twelve-tone technique.

== Awards and recognition ==
- 1974: Johann-Wenzel-Stamitz-Preis
- 1979: Composition Prize of the City of Düsseldorf
- Also: Goldene Plakette der Stadt Mönchengladbach (Golden Badge of the City of Mönchengladbach)
