= St Bartholomew's Church, Erfurt =

St Bartholomew's Church
- German: Bartholomäuskirche
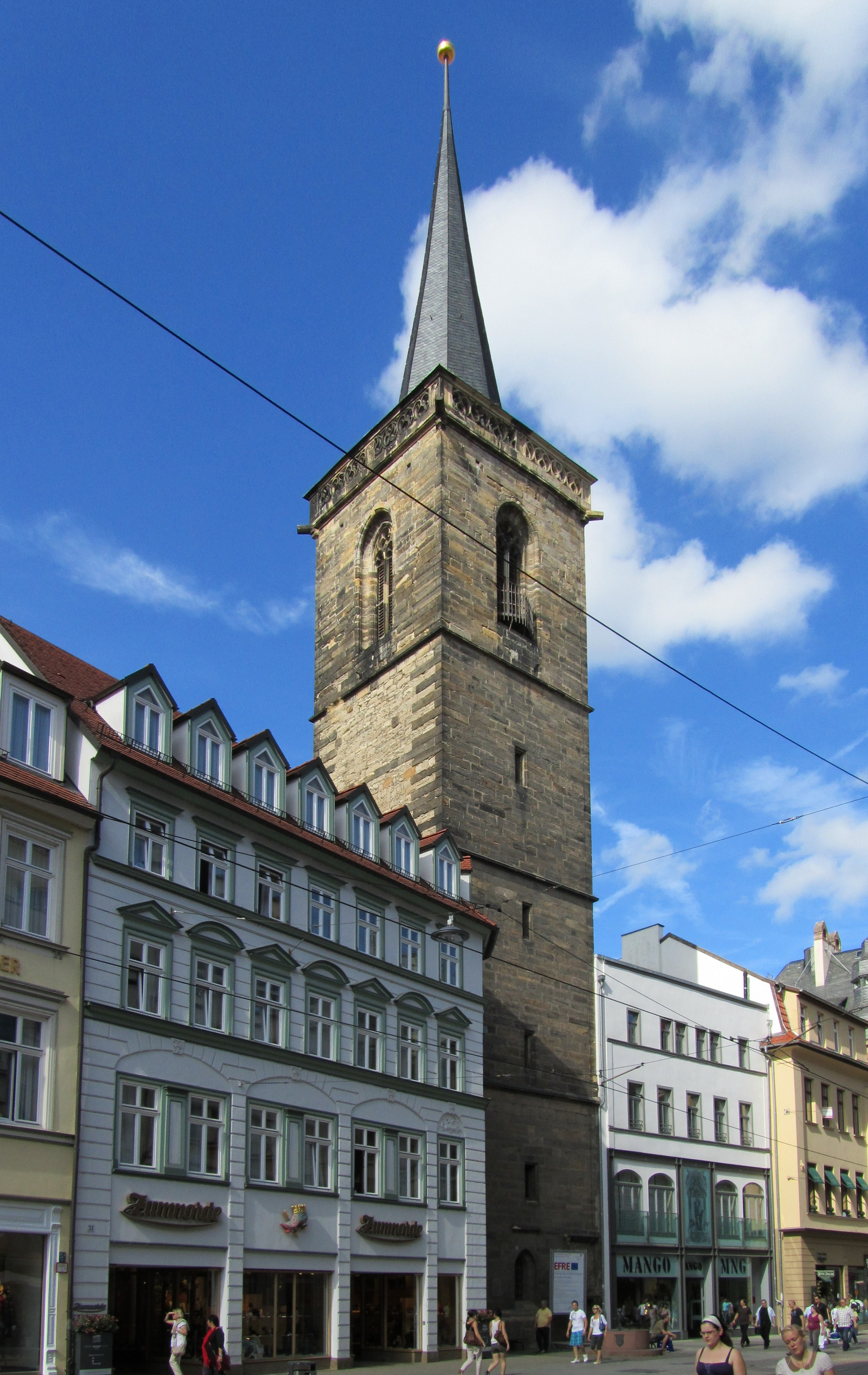
- View from west

- 50°58′30″N 11°01′57″E
- Location: Erfurt, Thuringia
- Address: Anger 52; 99084
- Country: Germany
- Denomination: Lutheran (last)
- Previous denomination: Catholic

History
- Status: Tower: museum, carillon
- Dedication: Saint Bartholomew

Architecture
- Style: Gothic
- Years built: after 1291 (nave); 1411–48 (tower)
- Demolished: 1715 (except for the tower)

St Bartholomew's Church (German: Bartholomäuskirche) in the historical city centre of Erfurt in Thuringia, Germany, was a Gothic church building at the western Anger square. Today, only its tower, the Bartholomäusturm (Bartholomew Tower), remains; since 1979, it has been housing a carillon.

== History ==
St Bartholomew's Church was first mentioned in a document in 1282. In 1291, a fire destroyed the church, but it was rebuilt in the following years. The tower was erected between 1411 and 1448. After a restoration, the church received a new organ by the organ builder Andreas Eggemann in 1511. After the Reformation in 1525, St Bartholomew's Church was assigned to the Protestant congregation of the Barfüßerkirche and was still used until 1571. In 1545, the Erfurt city council had the copper roof of the tower replaced with a slate roof. In 1660, a fire destroyed the already unused church, but not the tower. The walls, which were in danger of collapsing, were demolished between 1667 and 1668. In 1715, the nave was completely demolished and the parsonage and deacon's house of the Barfüßer parish were built in its place from 1715 to 1717. In 1876, the buildings were purchased by private individuals. The tower was used as the bell tower of the Barfüßerkirche until 1942.

During the invasion of Erfurt by American troops, the Bartholomew Tower came under artillery fire on 11 April 1945, destroying the wooden spire and the tracery balustrade. By 1950, the war damage had largely been repaired; the spire was, however, replaced by a flat roof with a circumferential parapet. As part of the celebrations for the 1250th anniversary of the city in 1992, the eight-sided spire was reconstructed.

== Carillon ==
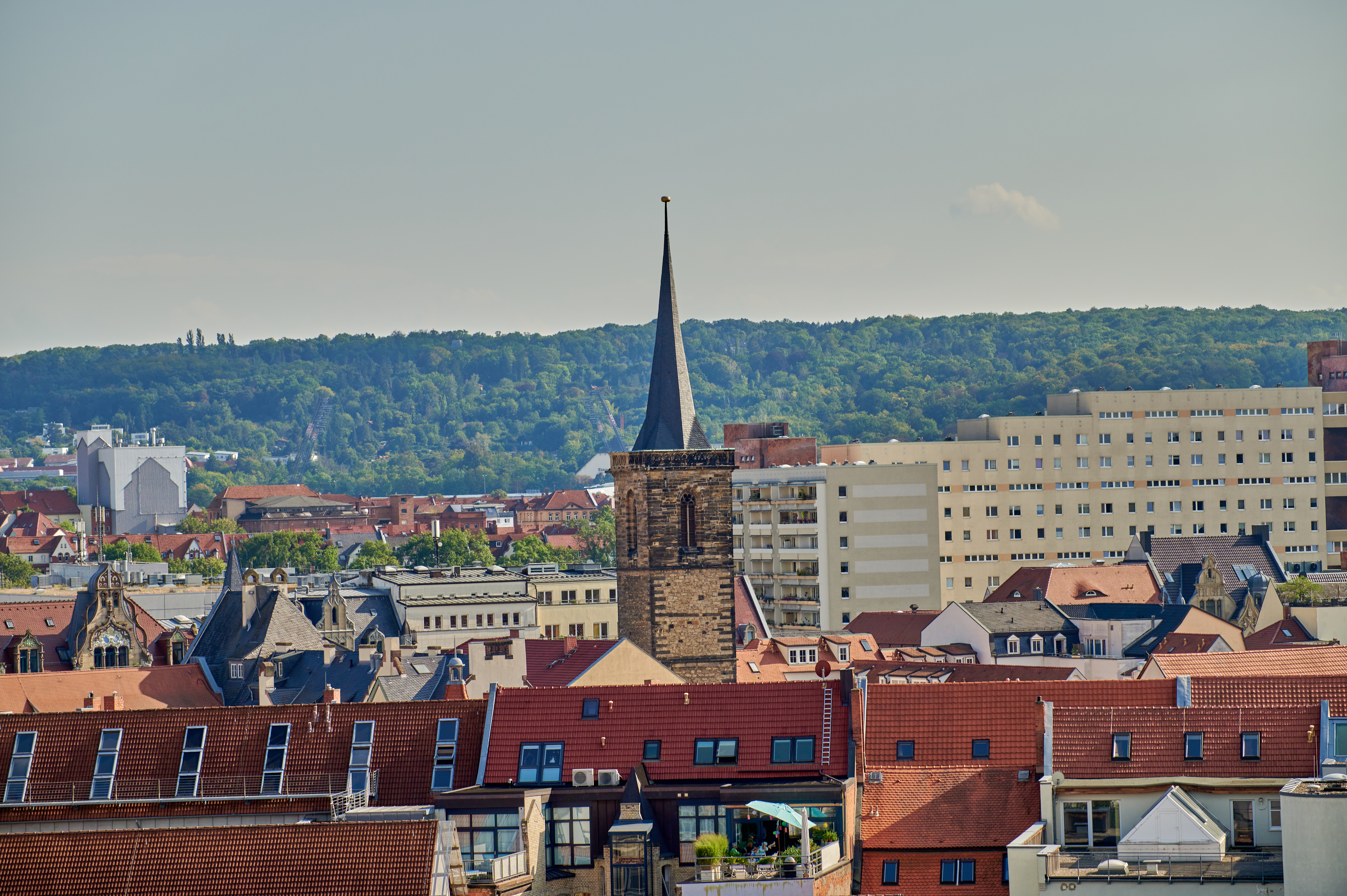
View from St Giles' Church

Today, the 35-metre-high (114 ft 10 in) Bartholomew Tower houses a carillon.

The decision to install the carillon was made in April 1977, probably also in the context of the simultaneous transformation of the Anger square into a pedestrian zone. The ensemble, consisting of 60 bronze bells made by the Schilling company in Apolda, was lifted into the tower's structure and installed on 18 August 1979. The total weight of the bells is 13,626 kg (13.411 LT; 30,040 lb), the largest weighs 2,393 kg (2.355 LT; 5,276 lb), the smallest 20 kg (0.020 LT; 44 lb).

On the occasion of the 30th anniversary of the founding of the GDR, the inauguration took place on 7 October 1979 with a concert and great participation of the population. At the time, it was the largest carillon in the GDR; today, it is the fifth-largest of the 42 carillons in Germany.

In 1992, the bells were reworked by the Karlsruher Glocken- und Kunstgießerei ("Karlsruhe bell and art foundry") and a computer-controlled automatic mechanism was installed. Since then, the five-octave carillon with 74 pieces has been sounding automatically three times a day (10, 12 and 18 o'clock) and is played by a carillonneur on special occasions.

== Bibliography ==
- Raßloff, Steffen (7 October 2009). "Glockenspiel wird 30 Jahre". Thüringer Allgemeine (in German).
- Raßloff, Steffen (2010). "30 Jahre Carillon im Bartholomäusturm. Ein Kapitel Erfurter Kulturgeschichte" (PDF). Mitteilungen des Vereins für die Geschichte und Altertumskunde von Erfurt (in German) (71): 149–162. Archived from the original (PDF) on 30 March 2016.
- Schilling, Margarete (1979). Das Erfurter Glockenspiel (in German). Erfurt.
