= Buxton Orr =

British composer (1924–1997)

Buxton Daeblitz Orr (18 April 1924 – 27 December 1997) was a Glasgow-born Anglo-Scottish composer and teacher.

== Life ==
Originally trained as a doctor, Orr gave up medicine and switched to music in 1952, studying composition at the Guildhall School of Music with Benjamin Frankel and conducting with Aylmer Buesst. Through Frankel's help and influence, Orr became active for a time composing film scores, and his first general recognition as a composer came from the high-profile production of Tennessee Williams' Suddenly Last Summer in 1959, starring Elizabeth Taylor and Katharine Hepburn and directed by Joseph L. Mankiewicz. His one-act opera The Wager was successfully staged at Sadler's Wells in 1961.

With his return to the Guildhall School of Music as a professor in 1965, Orr soon gained a reputation as an energetic and influential teacher. He founded the Guildhall New Music Ensemble and also conducted the London Jazz Composers’ Orchestra between 1970 and 1980, the latter stimulating his particular interest in improvisation. His pupils included Deirdre Gribbin, Barry Guy, Gary Higginson, Philip Sawyers and Debbie Wiseman.

Orr married Isabelle Roberts in 1955; that marriage was dissolved and in 1968 he married Jean Latimer, who died in 2023.

In 1990 Orr gave up regular teaching to devote more time to composition, and lived with his second wife Jean Latimer in the Wye Valley until his death. A new opera, The Alchemist, was in the process of being orchestrated at his death.

Buxton Orr was not related to the composer Robin Orr (1909–2006).

== Music ==
Orr's music includes works in all genres, including songs, chamber music, works for brass and wind band, orchestral music, opera and music theatre as well as film scores. His style is notable for its interest in structures that evolve through continuous variation, often with his personal take on 12-tone serialism, using tonal intervals and octave doubling. The three Piano Trios (1982, 1986 and 1990), the orchestral Triptych (1977) and the substantial 40 minute orchestral Sinfonia ricercante (1987) are representative examples of this style. Several virtuoso instrumental fantasies on famous themes, such as the Carmen Fantasy for cello (1987 – also re-scored for orchestra), deconstruct familiar material to create new compositions. The others in this series are Portrait of the Don (theme from Don Giovanni, 1987), Catfish Row (theme from Porgy and Bess, 1997) and Tales from Windsor Forest (theme from Falstaff, 1997).

Elements of jazz are present in some works, particularly those scored for brass band, such as the Caledonian Suite (often used as a band test piece), Tournament (1985) for brass tentet and Narration (1993) for symphonic wind ensemble. Refrains III, written for the London Jazz Composers' Orchestra, develops Orr's interest in improvisation, even including the conductor as one of the different improvising groups within the total ensemble. It was first broadcast on 6 May 1975 on BBC Radio 3. (There are six Refrains, all written for different forces. Each of them uses a recurrent idea to bind together a structure).

His early film music included horror film scores such as Grip of the Strangler (1958), Corridors of Blood (1958) and Doctor Blood's Coffin (1961). Some of his stock music was used in several Doctor Who serials in the 1960s. During the 1980s Orr composed three music theatre pieces: Unicorn (1981), The Last Circus (1984) and Ring in the New (1986), and a number of song cycles, including the "caustic" Ten Types of Hospital Visitor (1986), setting Charles Causley.

Recordings

- Caledonian Suite (1980), Tournament (1985) and Narration (1993). Royal Scottish Academy Of Music And Drama Wind Orchestra & Brass, Doyen DOY CD 118 (2001)
- Celtic Suite for strings (1968) and Fanfare and Processional for strings (1968) on The Land of the Mountain and the Flood: Scottish Orchestral Music, ASV CDWHL21C (1999)
- Chamber Music for Strings, includes String Quartet No 1 (1977) and No 2 (1985), String Trio (1996), Duo for Baroque Violin and String Bass (1994). Beethoven String Trio, Toccata TOCC0103 (2012)
- Piano Trios No 1-3. York Piano Trio. Marco Polo MP 3842 (1996)
- Songs: (includes the song cycles Canzona (1963), Ten Types of Hospital Visitor (1986), and Songs of a Childhood (1967). Delphian DCD 34175 (2017)
- (with Barry Guy). The London Jazz Composers' Orchestra Ode (Incus, 1972)
- Elegy (1994) and A Carmen Fantasy (1985) for cello and piano on dialogo. Dagmar Spengler and Oliver Drechsel, Verlag Dohr DCD 017 (2002)

Film music

- Grip of the Strangler (1958)
- Fiend Without a Face (1958)
- Corridors of Blood (1958)
- First Man Into Space (1959)
- Suddenly, Last Summer (1959)
- Doctor Blood's Coffin (1961)
- The Snake Woman (1961)
- The Eyes of Annie Jones (1964)
- Walk a Tightrope (1965)
