= Suddenly, Last Summer (film) =

1959 film by Joseph L. Mankiewicz

- Theatrical release poster
- Directed by: Joseph L. Mankiewicz
- Screenplay by: Gore Vidal; Tennessee Williams
- Based on: Suddenly, Last Summer by Tennessee Williams
- Produced by: Sam Spiegel
- Starring: Elizabeth Taylor; Katharine Hepburn; Montgomery Clift
- Cinematography: Jack Hildyard
- Edited by: Thomas G. Stanford
- Music by: Buxton Orr; Malcolm Arnold
- Production companies: Horizon Pictures; Academy Pictures Corporation; Camp Films
- Distributed by: Columbia Pictures
- Release dates: December 20, 1959 (Los Angeles); January 1960 (United States)
- Running time: 114 minutes
- Countries: United Kingdom; United States
- Language: English
- Budget: $2.5 million
- Box office: $9 million (rentals)

Suddenly, Last Summer is a 1959 Southern Gothic psychological drama mystery film based on the 1958 play by Tennessee Williams. The film stars Elizabeth Taylor, Katharine Hepburn, and Montgomery Clift, with Albert Dekker, Mercedes McCambridge, and Gary Raymond. It was directed by Joseph L. Mankiewicz and produced by Sam Spiegel from a screenplay by Gore Vidal and Williams with cinematography by Jack Hildyard and production design by Oliver Messel. The musical score was composed by Buxton Orr, using themes by Malcolm Arnold.

The plot centers on Catherine Holly, a young woman who, at the insistence of her wealthy aunt, is being evaluated by a psychiatric doctor to receive a lobotomy after witnessing the death of her cousin Sebastian Venable while traveling with him in the fictional island of Cabeza de Lobo the previous summer.

== Plot ==
In 1937 New Orleans, Catherine Holly is a young woman who has been institutionalized for an emotional disturbance related to the death of her cousin, Sebastian Venable, under strange circumstances while they were on summer holiday in Europe. Sebastian's wealthy mother, Violet Venable, makes every effort to suppress the sordid truth surrounding her son's demise. As a bribe to the state hospital's administrator, Lawrence J. Hockstader, Violet offers to finance a new wing for the decrepit and underfunded facility if he promises that brilliant young surgeon, John Cukrowicz, will perform a lobotomy on her niece.

Meeting with Dr. Cukrowicz, Violet describes Sebastian as a sensitive poet, recounting their close relationship and her travels with him. When Cukrowicz says he must evaluate Catherine to determine whether a lobotomy would be appropriate, Violet insists that Catherine is telling incredible lies about Sebastian's death and spouting obscenities. She relates that an elderly gardener at the institution has accused Catherine of attempting to seduce him; when the gardener resisted her advances, Catherine accused him of sexual assault. After meeting the beautiful Catherine, Cukrowicz is skeptical of the gardener's story.

Beginning to doubt that Catherine is as deranged as Violet claims, Cukrowicz moves Catherine to less threatening conditions in the nurses' quarters of the state hospital. He decides to try talk therapy to evaluate her. Meanwhile, Catherine's mother and brother visit Catherine, revealing that Violet will pay them a large sum of money if they sign papers to commit Catherine to the institution and allow the lobotomy to be performed. Horrified, Catherine flees aimlessly into the men's wing, where she is nearly attacked, causing more disruption and "confirmation" of the salacious accusations against her.

Cukrowicz convinces Violet to visit Catherine at the hospital, where Violet reveals her resentment at Catherine's having supplanted her on Sebastian's last trip. Violet blames Catherine for not properly nurturing Sebastian, for his inability to create the single poem he wrote every summer, and for contributing to the "heart attack" that was the "official" cause of death. Catherine asserts that Sebastian asked her to replace his mother when Violet had grown too old to be "bait" to attract young men, hinting that Sebastian was homosexual. Responding that she will not listen to such "obscenity", Violet insists that Cukrowicz "cut this hideous story out of her brain". Violet informs Hockstader that she will not move forward with the new hospital wing until the operation has been performed. Panicked and desperate, Catherine now attempts to throw herself off a high balcony, but is prevented by a male orderly.

In a last-ditch effort, Cukrowicz takes Catherine to the Venable estate, where he administers a drug to overcome her resistance to remembering the traumatic events. Catherine recalls how she and Sebastian spent their days on the beach on the island of Cabeza de Lobo; to attract young men, Sebastian insisted she wear a revealing white bathing suit that became nearly transparent when wet. Because the boys were desperate for money, Sebastian was successful in his efforts with them. "Sated" with "the dark haired ones" and "famished for blonds", however, Sebastian began to make plans to depart for Northern Europe. On the final day, Sebastian and Catherine were beset by a horde of boys begging for money. When Sebastian rejected them, they stalked him through the streets of the town. Sebastian attempted to flee, but the boys swarmed around him at every turn, finally cornering him among the ruins of a temple on a hilltop. During the chase, Catherine frantically tried to catch up with Sebastian, arriving in time to see him overwhelmed by the boys. According to Catherine, the boys tore Sebastian apart and ate pieces of his flesh like vultures.

As she recalls the horror, Catherine breaks down screaming and crying. Unbalanced when faced with the truth, Violet walks away, rambling while mistaking Cukrowicz for Sebastian. As Cukrowicz turns away, the hospital administrator states that Catherine may be telling the truth. Leaving the house for the garden, Cukrowicz calls out to Catherine, who takes his hand as they walk away together.

== Cast ==
- Elizabeth Taylor as Catherine "Cathy" Holly
- Katharine Hepburn as Violet "Vi" Venable
- Montgomery Clift as Dr. John Cukrowicz
- Albert Dekker as Dr. Lawrence J. Hockstader
- Mercedes McCambridge as Mrs. Grace Holly
- Gary Raymond as George Holly
- Mavis Villiers as Miss Foxhill
- Patricia Marmont as Nurse Benson
- Joan Young as Sister Felicity
- Maria Britneva as Lucy

== Production ==
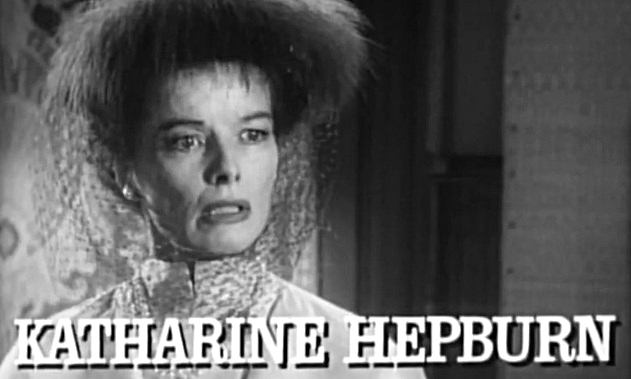
From the film's trailer

Suddenly, Last Summer is based on a one-act play by Tennessee Williams that originally was paired with Something Unspoken as part of the 1958 off-Broadway double-bill titled Garden District. The work was adapted for the screen by Gore Vidal; though Williams also received credit, he later said that he had nothing to do with the film. Vidal attempted to construct the narrative as a small number of very long scenes, echoing the structure of the play.

Following A Streetcar Named Desire (1951) and Cat on a Hot Tin Roof (1958), Suddenly, Last Summer was the third of Williams' plays to be adapted for the screen that dealt with the subject of homosexuality, although it was far more explicit in its treatment than either of the previous films were allowed to be under the Motion Picture Production Code. Working in conjunction with the National Legion of Decency, the Production Code Administration gave the filmmakers special dispensation to depict Sebastian Venable, declaring "Since the film illustrates the horrors of such a lifestyle, it can be considered moral in theme even though it deals with sexual perversion." Publicity stills of Sebastian were shot—showing him as a handsome, if drawn, man in a white suit—but his face never is seen in the released film. Williams asserted that no actor could portray Sebastian convincingly and that his onscreen absence only made his presence more strongly felt.

Elizabeth Taylor selected Suddenly, Last Summer as her first film project after she had recently ended her contract with Metro-Goldwyn-Mayer (MGM). At the time, she was the biggest box office draw in Hollywood, and she used her leverage to have Montgomery Clift hired for the film. After a near-fatal car crash while filming Raintree County (1957), Clift had become heavily dependent on drugs and alcohol. Although no film production company would insure Clift, producer Sam Spiegel approved his casting. Principal photography took place between May and September 1959, with the interior scenes shot at Shepperton Studios in Surrey, England. The "Cabeza de Lobo" sequence was filmed in Spain at Mallorca in the Balearic Islands and at Begur and Castell d'Aro, Platja d'Aro i S'Agaró in Gerona.

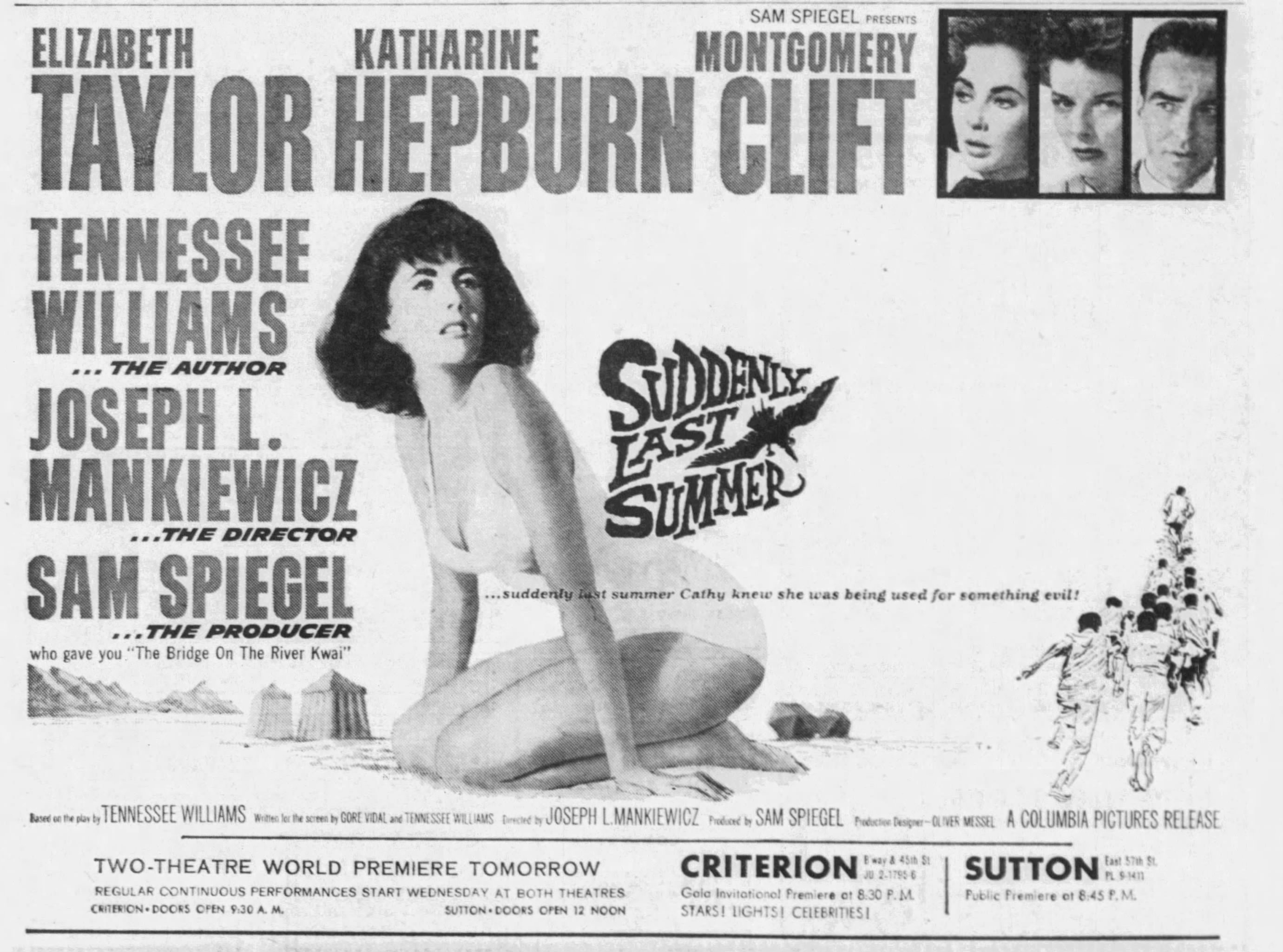
Theatrical advertisement from 1959

Clift found filming the long scenes exhausting and had to have his longest scene shot in multiple takes, one or two lines at a time. Clift's shaky performance reportedly led director Joseph Mankiewicz to ask Spiegel several times to have the actor dropped. It also has been stated that Mankiewicz had mistreated Clift on set, drawing the ire of Katharine Hepburn who had grown sympathetic toward him. However, editor William Hornbeck and cinematographer Jack Hildyard disputed that Mankiewicz supported Clift while filming his scenes. Hepburn was also upset when Mankiewicz decided to film a closeup shot of her hands, having them appear old and withered, by removing the diffusion lenses. Mankiewicz explained, "I wanted her suddenly to look old. In other words, the destruction of the legend about Sebastian, her son, destroyed the illusion of youth. I think Kate sensed what Jack [Hildyard] and I were up (to), and she didn't like what I was doing."

On the last day of filming her scenes, Hepburn asked Mankiewicz to confirm that her services were no longer required. When Mankiewicz did, Hepburn approached him and spat in his face. Sources differ as to whether she also spat in Sam Spiegel's face. According to one biography, Hepburn marched into Spiegel's office and harshly said, "You're just a pig in a silk suit who send flowers!" She spat on the office floor and left.

Problems beset the film's musical score as well. Malcolm Arnold originally was retained to work on it, but he apparently found certain aspects of the story so disturbing that he withdrew from the project after composing only the main themes. Buxton Orr completed the score.

== Reception ==
=== Box office ===
Suddenly, Last Summer was a hit at the box office, earning $6.4 million in theatrical rentals in the United States and Canada and $9 million worldwide. FilmInk attributed this to the film's sexual content.

=== Critical response ===
Contemporary reviews were mixed. Although Hepburn and Taylor received some positive notices for their performances, the film was judged as having suffered for being stretched to feature length and having its content toned down from that of the play.

Bosley Crowther of The New York Times outright panned the film, writing that

"the main trouble with this picture is that an idea that is good for not much more than a blackout is stretched to exhausting length and, for all its fine cast and big direction, it is badly, pretentiously played ... Elizabeth Taylor is rightly roiled as the niece, but her wallow in agony at the climax is sheer histrionic showing off. . . Joseph L. Mankiewicz's direction is strained and sluggish, as is, indeed, the whole conceit of the drama. It should have been left to the off-Broadway stage."

Variety called it "possibly the most bizarre film ever made by any major American company," adding,

"The film has some very effective moments, but on the whole it fails to move the spectator. Perhaps the reason is that what was a long one-act play has been expanded in the screenplay, by Williams and Gore Vidal, to a longish motion picture. Nothing that's been added is an improvement on the original; the added scenes are merely diversionary."

Harrison's Reports wrote "Aside from the fact that the film will draw curiosity-seekers in droves, the film is a mystery—and the mystery is why Sam Spiegel, a brilliant producer, Joseph L. Mankiewicz, an excellent director, and Columbia, a responsible distributor, even bothered with it in the first place." John McCarten of The New Yorker called the film "a preposterous and monotonous potpourri of incest, homosexuality, psychiatry, and, so help me, cannibalism."

Richard L. Coe of The Washington Post delivered a mixed review, calling the film "undeniably powerful" and Hepburn "utterly brilliant," but found that

"in even trying to fit this analogy of depravity into something approximating our film standards, the whole point is submerged in mists of allusion which only knowledge of the original play can penetrate ... It can be said that the moral is utterly valid, that those we buy and use utterly destroy us, for Mrs. Venable and her wealth are as destroyed as her son and his selfishness. But by framing the statement in so purposely shocking a story and then by not being truly honest about even that, the film too often becomes purposeless, evasive."

The Monthly Film Bulletin wrote that by extending the stage version to feature film length, "the story now sags sufficiently for one to question its credentials, and to realise that its attempt to illuminate the darker corners of the mind is actually nothing more than a slightly infantile fantasy of guilt and masochism." The review also criticized "the spineless box-office ending, which balances Catherine's recovery against a contrived, conventional retreat into madness on the part of Mrs. Venable."

John L. Scott of the Los Angeles Times was more positive, calling the film "an absorbing, in part, shocking motion picture," in which Hepburn and Taylor "pull out all the histrionic stops, resulting in performances that will undoubtedly bring plenty of votes come Oscar-nominating time."

Several people involved with Suddenly, Last Summer later went on to denounce the film. Despite being credited for the screenplay, Tennessee Williams denied having any part in writing it. He thought Elizabeth Taylor was miscast as Catherine, telling Life in 1961: "It stretched my credulity to believe such a 'hip' doll as our Liz wouldn't know at once in the film that she was 'being used for something evil.'" Williams also told The Village Voice in 1973 that Suddenly, Last Summer went too far afield from his original play and "made [him] throw up."

Gore Vidal criticized elements of the ending, adding: "We were also not helped by ... those overweight ushers from the Roxy Theatre on Fire Island pretending to be small ravenous boys." Mankiewicz himself criticized the source material, describing the play as "badly constructed ... based on the most elementary Freudian psychology."

=== Accolades ===
Award	Category	Recipient(s)	Result	Ref.
Academy Awards	Best Actress	Katharine Hepburn	Nominated	
Academy Awards	Best Actress	Elizabeth Taylor	Nominated	
Academy Awards	Best Art Direction – Black-and-White	Oliver Messel, William Kellner and Scott Slimon	Nominated	
Bambi Awards	Best Actress – International	Elizabeth Taylor	Nominated	
David di Donatello Awards	Golden Plate Award	Elizabeth Taylor	Won	
Golden Globe Awards	Best Actress in a Motion Picture – Drama	Katharine Hepburn	Nominated	
Golden Globe Awards	Best Actress in a Motion Picture – Drama	Elizabeth Taylor	Won	
Laurel Awards	Top Female Dramatic Performance	Katharine Hepburn	Nominated	
Laurel Awards	Top Female Dramatic Performance	Elizabeth Taylor	Won	
Laurel Awards	Top Score	Buxton Orr and Malcolm Arnold	4th Place	
National Board of Review Awards	Top Ten Films		8th Place	
