= Scott Slimon =

English set decorator (1915–1980)

- Born: 8 August 1915; London, England
- Died: January 1980 (aged 64); London, England
- Occupation: Set decorator
- Years active: 1947–1970

Scott Slimon (8 August 1915 – January 1980) was an English set decorator. He was nominated for an Academy Award in the category Best Art Direction for the film Suddenly, Last Summer.

== Selected filmography ==
- Suddenly, Last Summer (1959)
- Bunny Lake Is Missing (1965)
- Dr. Who and the Daleks (1965)
