= Barfüßerkirche, Erfurt =

Barfüßerkirche Discalced's Church
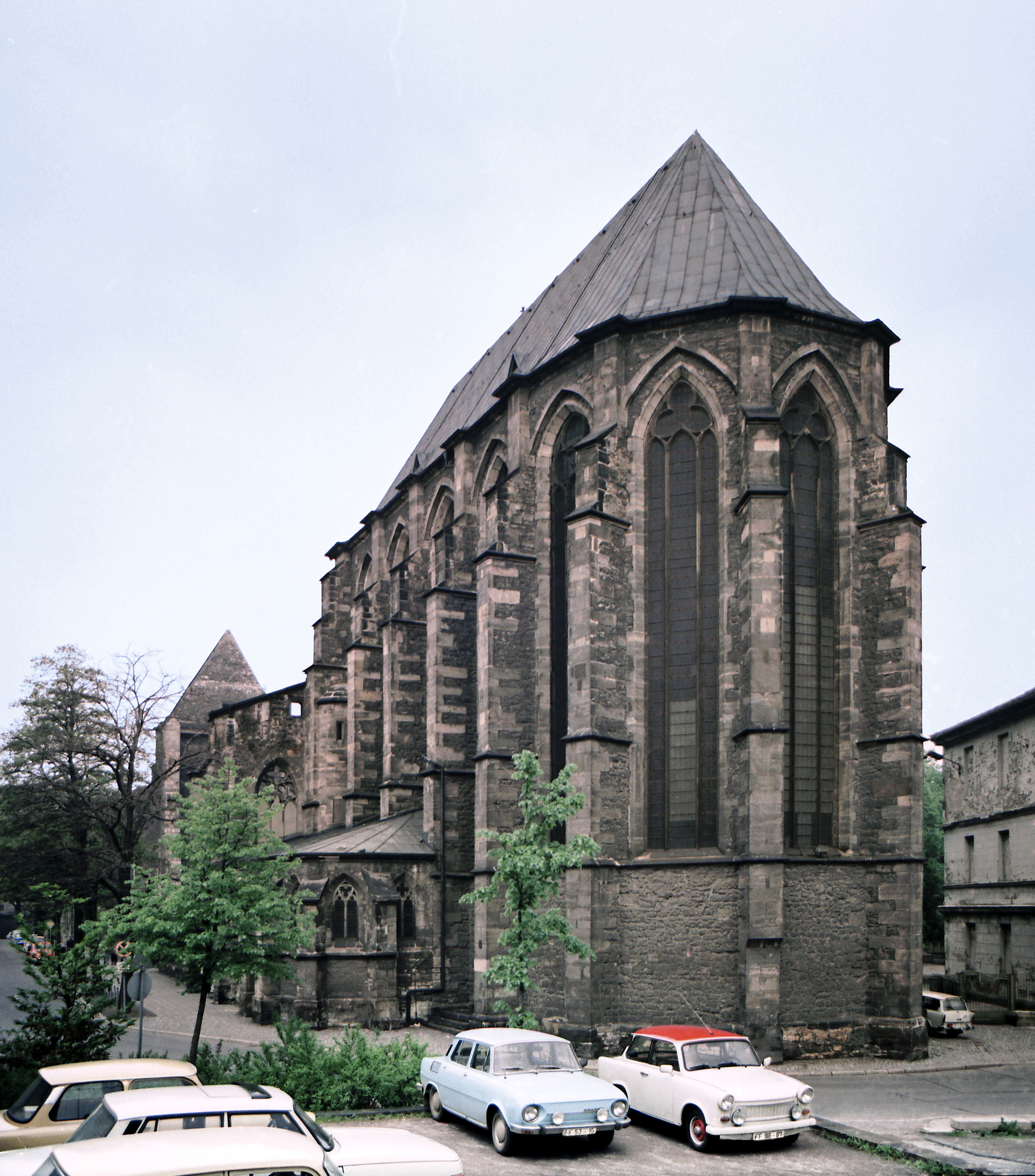
- View from east (1987)

- Location within Thuringia Location within Germany
- 50°58′32″N 11°1′48″E
- Location: Erfurt, Thuringia
- Address: Barfüßerstraße 20; 99084 Erfurt
- Country: Germany
- Denomination: Lutheran (last)
- Previous denomination: Catholic

History
- Status: Ruin, theatre venue
- Dedication: John the Baptist
- Consecrated: 1316 (choir)

Architecture
- Heritage designation: Kulturdenkmal in Thuringia
- Style: High Gothic
- Years built: late 13th to early 15th century

The Barfüßerkirche (pronounced [ˈbaːʁfyːsɐˌkɪʁçə], "Discalced's Church") in the historical city centre of Erfurt in Thuringia, Germany, belonged to the most important church buildings of the city and was one of the most elaborate mendicant churches in Germany until its extensive destruction by bombing in 1944. It was mainly built in the 14th century as a monastery church of the Franciscans, who were also called Barfüßer (the Discalced, meaning "the Barefoot"). The choir was restored in the 1950s; beside the nave's ruin, it is situated west of the Schlösserbrücke bridge on the right bank of the Breitstrom, a branch of the Gera river.

== History ==
=== Franciscans' monastery ===
On 11 November 1224, the friars of the Franciscan Order, founded in 1210, settled outside the gates of Erfurt as the first mendicant order of the city. From 1221, the order spread throughout the empire as far as the Baltic Sea within a decade and favoured the cities for its monasteries. In Erfurt, they first took over the abandoned Church of the Holy Spirit, which had previously belonged to an Augustinian nunnery. At the instigation of the Archbishop of Mainz, they began building a church and monastery in 1229–30 and probably devoted themselves to nursing the sick. Seven years after their arrival, in 1231, they moved into convent buildings on the Gera river on a plot of land given to them by the archbishop's vicedominus of Apolda, Gunther. On 25 September 1259, Archbishop Gerhard I of Mainz was buried in this church. The monastery was ravaged by fires several times; in 1463, numerous Franciscans died of the plague. In the course of the 13th century, the Erfurt convent became one of the central places of the order's province, where most of the provincial chapters of Saxonia were held in the Middle Ages. Therefore, it can be concluded that the buildings must have been of a certain size.

The Franciscans probably soon founded a school and, from the beginning of the 1230s, a house of studies (studium custodiale, studium particulare) existed in Erfurt for the education first of the young friars in the Custody of Thuringia, a subdivision of the Saxon Franciscan Province (Saxonia) founded in 1230, but the studies soon developed both in terms of their level of content and their extent. The lector had a socius at his side, and from 1371, a second lector is recorded. The Order's studies were integrated with those of the Augustinian Hermits and the Dominicans into the theological faculty of the newly founded University of Erfurt in 1392; within the Order, Erfurt acquired the status of a general study of the Order, to which gifted friars were also sent from numerous other provinces of the Order to study – in 1467, from a total of fourteen provinces, including the provinces of Argentina (Strasbourg), Sicilia and Burgundia. For Saxonia, Erfurt was the educational centre for leaders; six of the twelve provincial ministers until 1517 had earned doctoral degrees in Erfurt. The first Franciscans to matriculate were the provincial minister Johannes von Chemnitz in 1395 and his successor (from 1396) Johannes von Minden who, from 1400 onwards, also acted as magister regens, head of Franciscan studies, and held a chair at the university. The university's teaching staff subsequently included Franciscans almost throughout, who formed a teaching branch at the theological faculty aligned with the theology of the Franciscans Bonaventure and Johannes Duns Scotus.

The Franciscans in Erfurt were very reserved towards the Franciscan Observance movement and therefore belonged to the Saxon Province of the Order of St John the Baptist from 1518. They opposed the Reformation; the Guardian of the convent, Conrad Clinge, had been a cathedral preacher in Erfurt since 1530 and vehemently defended the Catholic faith. As no new friars were allowed to be admitted, the monastery died out; it was dissolved in 1594, after the death of the last Franciscan, and the convent buildings were used as a school. For a short time, Minorites from Cologne once again came to the monastery buildings from 1628, but they had to leave as early as 1637 when the Swedes returned to Erfurt.

=== Church building ===
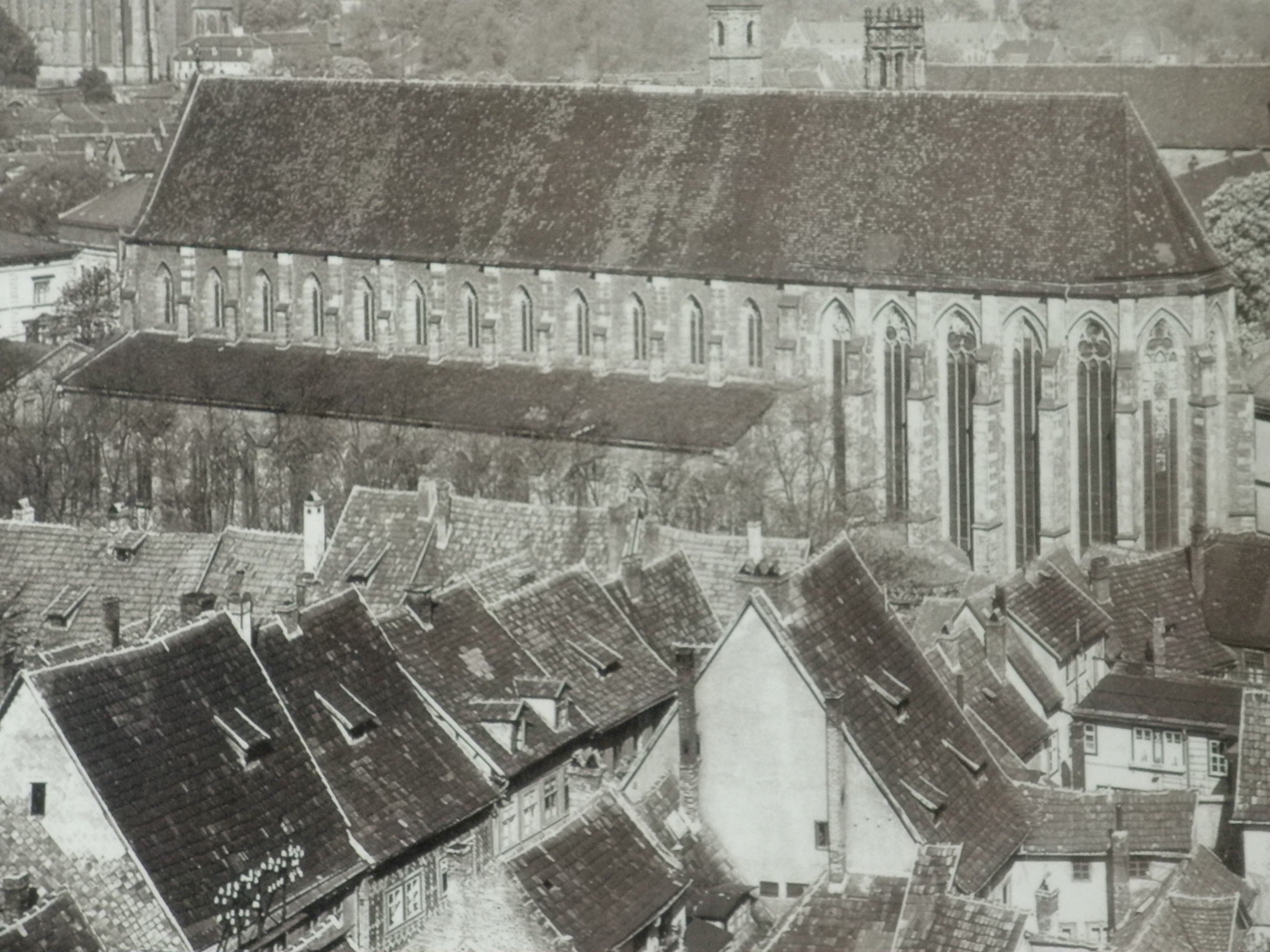
The Barfüßerkirche and neighbouring residential buildings before the destruction in 1944

After the city fire of 1291, construction of a new monastery church began, the choir of which was consecrated in 1316. Construction work on the nave of the three-aisled pillar basilica lasted until the beginning of the 15th century, and the tower was completed around 1400. The High-Gothic church with a long continuous gable roof was one of the largest churches in the city and was a prominent feature in the cityscape during the following centuries.

The elongated nave differs from that of the neighbouring Predigerkirche in that here two transverse-rectangular vaulted bays were set above each arcade arch. The choir of the Barfüßerkirche from around 1300 is longer than that of the Predigerkirche and shows simple tracery in steeply proportioned lancet windows. In the 15th century, a slender, delicately structured tower was added to the north side of the choir; a low chapel was built on the south side. In its vaulting, some shield-like vaulting endstones were incorporated from the nave, which still date from around 1400. The eastern vaulted beam rests on a figural wall console showing a hand and above it a demon's head depicted upside down.

In the course of the Reformation, the church became the parish church of the Protestant Barfüßer congregation in 1525. Martin Luther preached here on 11 October 1529. The monastery buildings to the north of the church were demolished during the Swedish period from 1641 to 1648 and used to build a bastion of the city fortifications. A lightning strike in 1838 damaged the nave and necessitated extensive restoration work from 1842 to 1852. After that, the Barfüßerkirche served as Erfurt's Protestant garrison church. From 24 August 1874, name plaques commemorated all the soldiers who had fallen as members of Erfurt's regiments in the German Unification Wars.

Around 1925, Lyonel Feininger painted several pictures of the Barfüßerkirche, one of which is kept in the Angermuseum in Erfurt, another in the Staatsgalerie Stuttgart. In the course of renovation work by Feininger's student Theo Kellner, ceiling paintings by Charles Crodel were created in 1938, destroyed in 1944.

During the Second World War, the movable and transportable art objects of the church and the valuable stained glass from 1230 to 1240 were secured by relocation to storage facilities from 1943 onwards. The stained-glass windows were placed in the cellar vaults under the cathedral crypt. The winged altar, however, was given makeshift protection on site by enclosure.

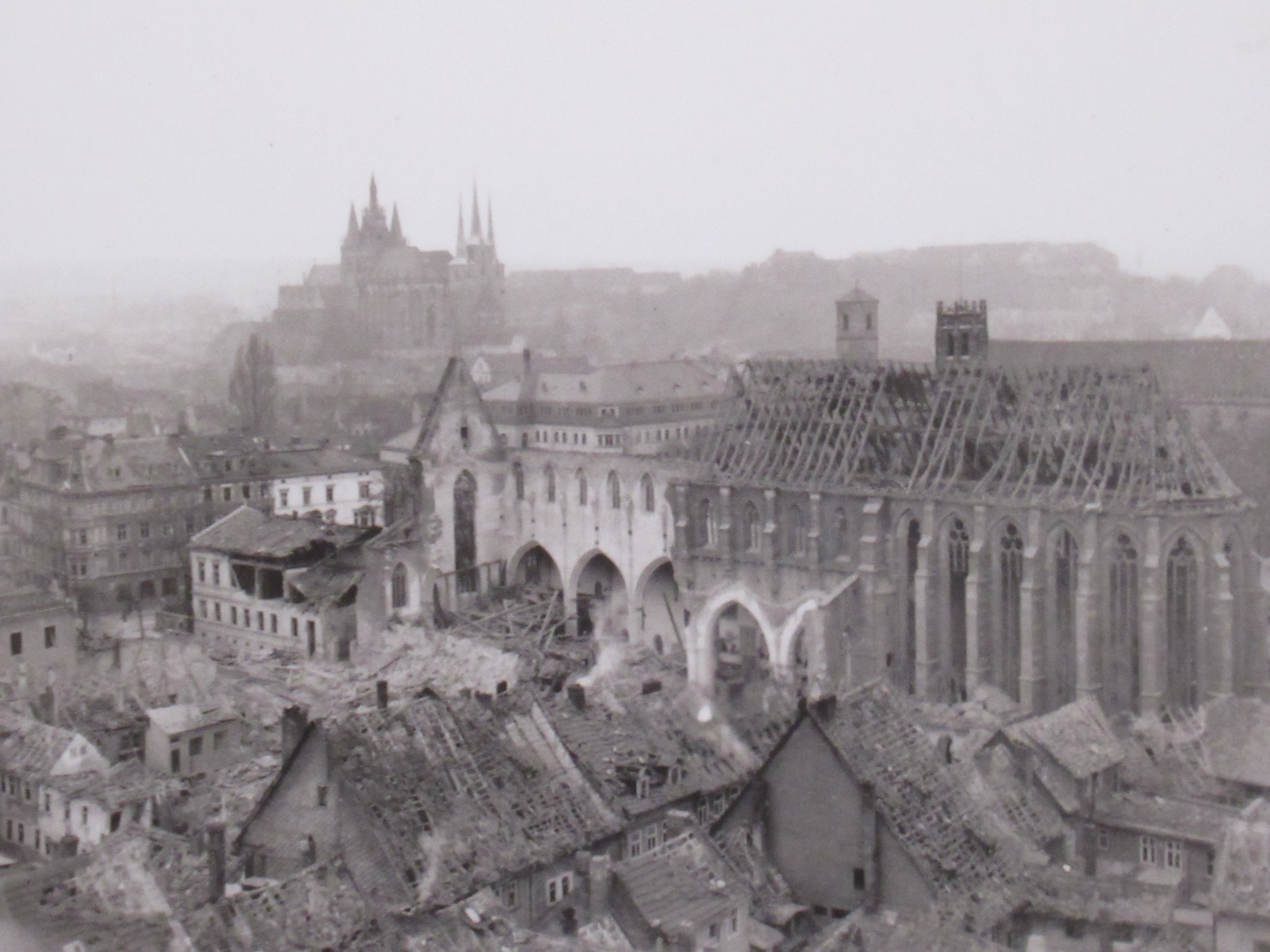
After the destruction (1945)

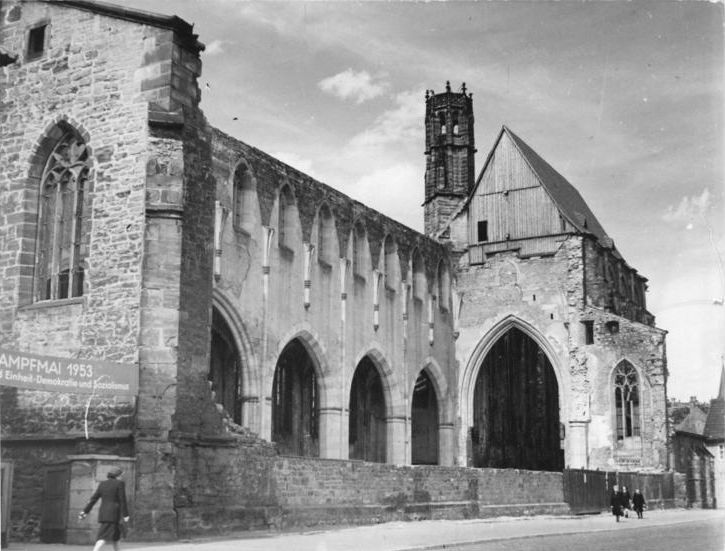
Ruins of the nave (1955)

On 27 November 1944, on the night of the Sunday before Advent on which the dead are commemorated by Protestants in Germany, the church, as well as the neighbouring residential area and the vicarage, were hit by an aerial mine during the attack on Erfurt by several British Mosquito bombers. The nave was destroyed, the high choir severely damaged. The clean-up work and the salvage of valuable architectural parts took place under the difficult wartime and post-war conditions. The partially destroyed pews of the church were burnt by the freezing population in the harsh winter of 1945.

On Ascension Day in 1957, a service was held again for the first time in the high choir, which had been repaired since 1950 and separated from the destroyed nave by a wall. The remains of the coloured glazing of six windows (from 1230 to 1240) had been inserted into the tracery of three windows across a smaller surface area. The high altar from 1445, which had been freed from its walled enclosure and restored, was put back into use. The remains of the nave could only be statically stabilised.

Due to declining membership, the congregations of the Barfüßerkirche and the Predigerkirche in Erfurt's city centre merged in 1977, and the Barfüßerkirche was handed over to the city. After further renovations of the choir, the church building became the branch of the Angermuseum for Medieval Art in 1983. Since 1989, further urgently needed conservation measures have been carried out. In November 2011, the city of Erfurt received the sum of €100,000 from federal funds for restoration work as part of the "Nationally Valuable Cultural Monuments" monument preservation programme. A total of €1.3 million was spent on static stabilisation and stone restoration as well as monument preservation work until 2015.

After 1990, a commemorative plaque on the street-facing outer wall in front of the ruin from the GDR era was removed, which had contained the following sentence in capital letters: "Destroyed by Anglo-American bombers on 26/11/1944." Since about the year 2000, theatre performances have been held inside the war ruins, preferably comedy plays such as Shakespeare's A Midsummer Night's Dream.

In 2007, a "Barfüßerkirche" working group was formed with the aim of raising the awareness of the people of Erfurt for this monument of national importance and thus to ensure the preservation of the ruin in the long term, or to have the church rebuilt one day. In 2009, the "Initiativkreis Barfüßerkirche" was formed as an independent association from the "Barfüßerkirche" working group. It consists of twelve voluntary members.

At the end of November 2012, the "Initiativkreis Barfüßerkirche" placed a newly cast bronze relief "Totentanz" ("Dance of the Dead") by Hans Walther (1947), based on a recovered plaster cast, on the outer wall in front of the ruins of the Barfüßerkirche, with an explanatory adjacent plaque: "Donated by friends of culture from Germany."

It is planned to intensify the use of the church as a museum, taking advantage of the Luther Year 2017, and to present the history of the mendicant orders in Erfurt.

== Interior ==
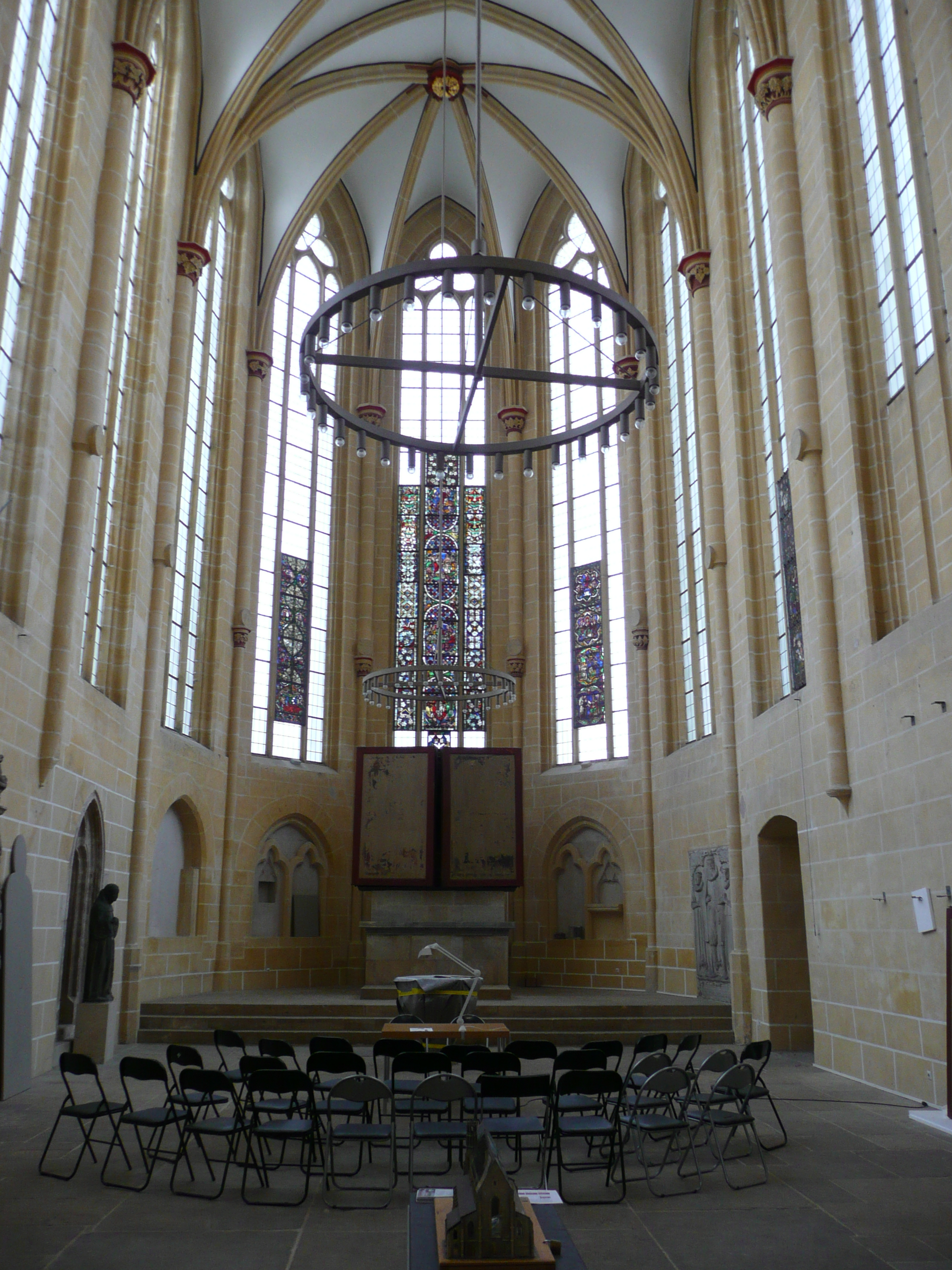
View to the apse

The polygonal choir has thirteen high windows, some of which are fitted with stained-glass panes that date from 1230 to 1240 and were already present in the Franciscan monastery. These precious panes show scenes from the Passion of Jesus and the life of Francis of Assisi. They are the oldest surviving depictions of Francis of Assisi in the territory of the former Holy Roman Empire and indicate a close relationship of the Barfüßerkirche with the mother monastery in Assisi.

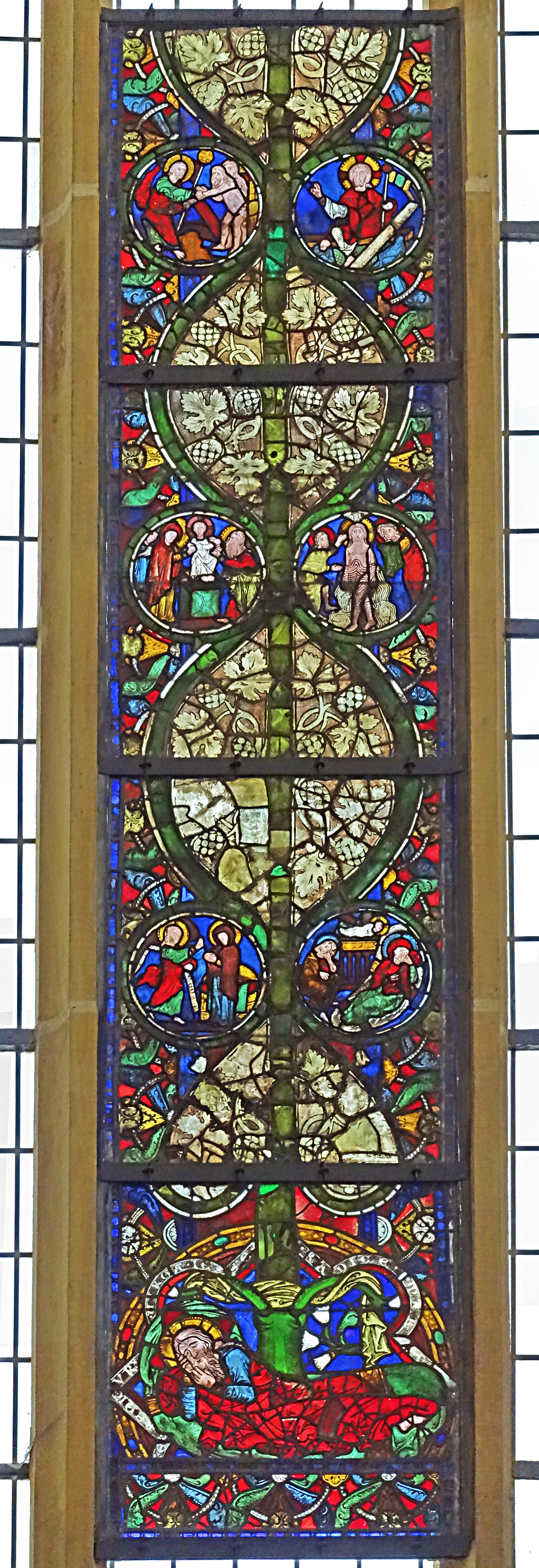
Jesus window

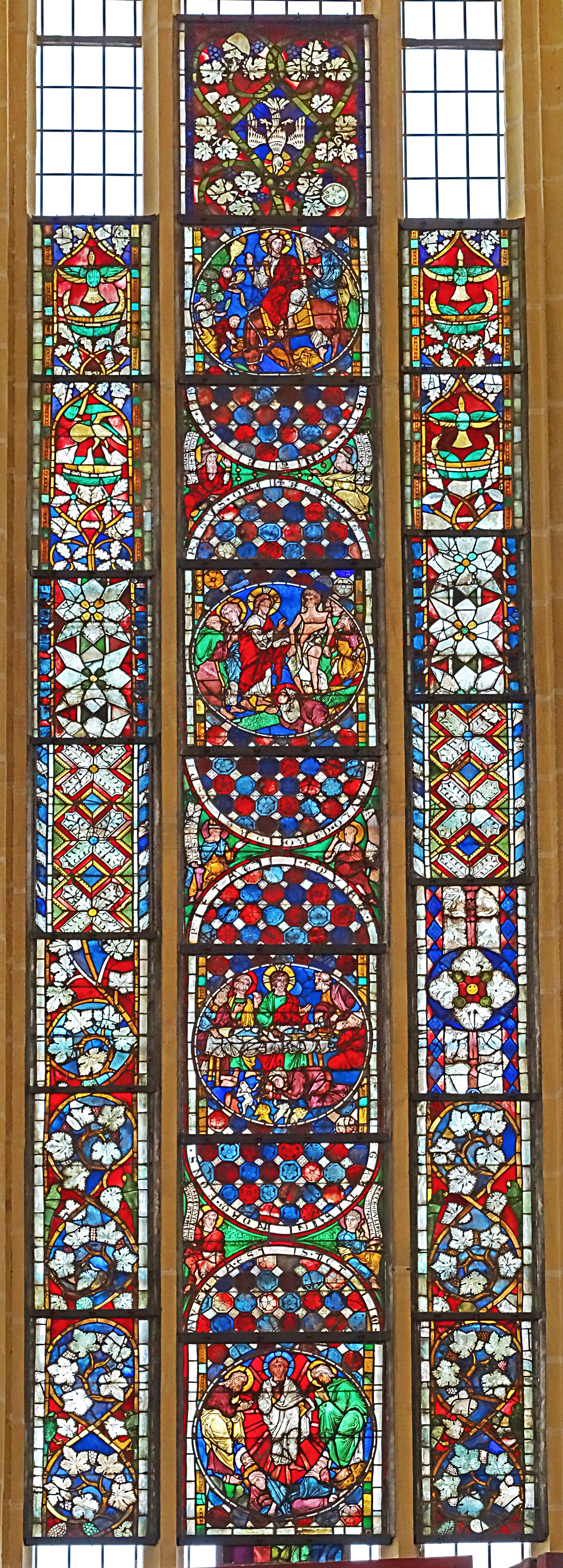
Christ and ornamental window

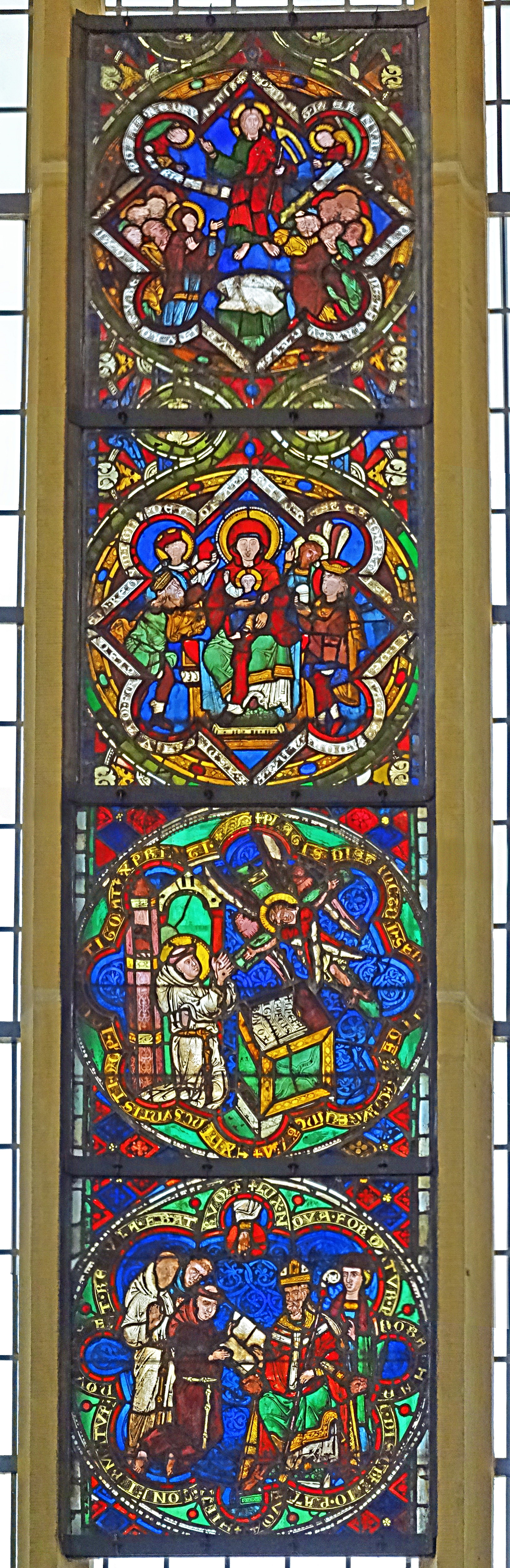
Francis window

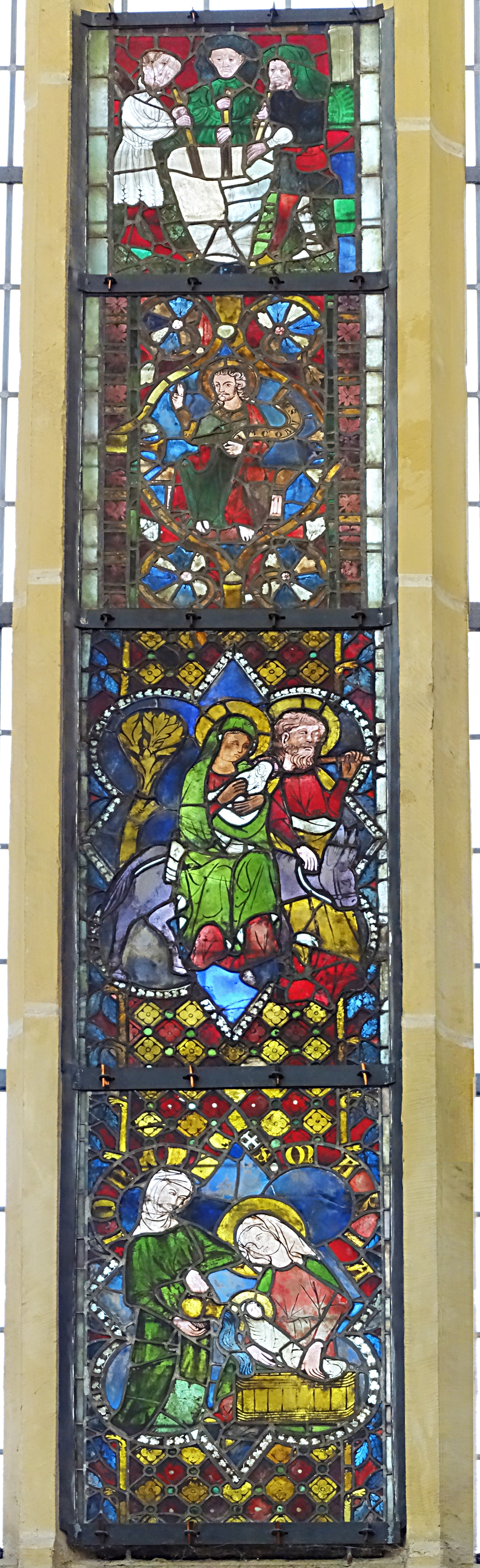
South window

The five-part winged retable from 1446 is one of the most significant carved altars in Erfurt. It was relocated from the abandoned Bartholomäuskirche (St Bartholomew's Church) to the Barfüßerkirche after 1594. After serious alterations in 1829, it was restored to its original state after 1945, as far as was still possible. The central shrine of the Gothic carved altar shows in its second transformation (fully opened state) the Coronation of Mary by Christ in the centre, surrounded by scenes from the life of Jesus: Birth, Presentation at the Temple, Resurrection and Outpouring of the Holy Spirit. On the inside of each wing, eight standing saints (by the master carver Jakob from Leipzig) were placed in two rows one above the other. The original invoices also list: Master carver Hans von Schmalkalden, paintings by Michael Wiespach, gilding by Master Jakob, hallmarking by Master Matthias and a painter from Göttingen. In the first transformation (half-opened), the Sunday side shows each six male and six female saints under canopies. The outer sides of the outer wings showed four painted scenes as the weekday side, which are, however, only very fragmentarily preserved.

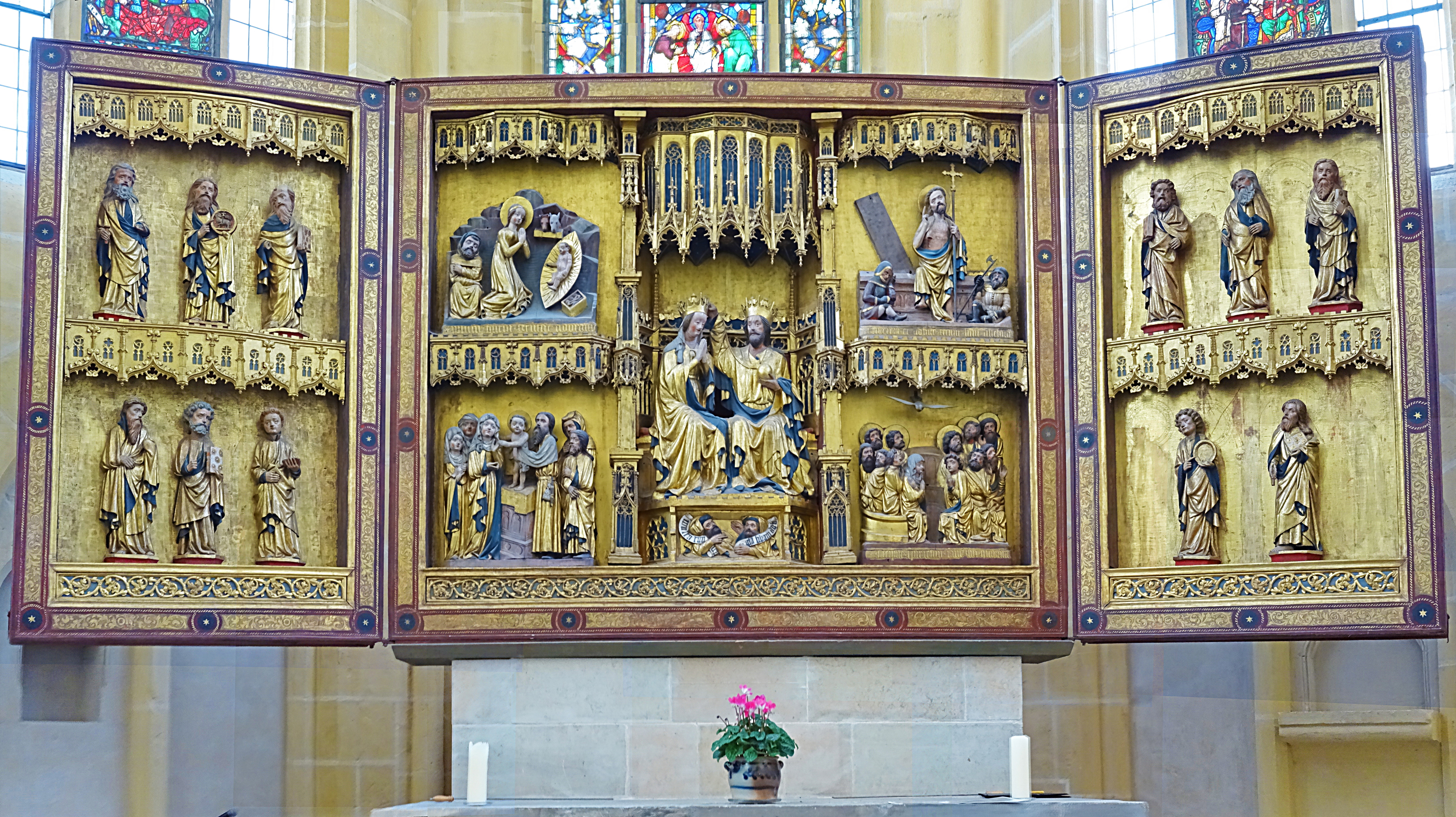
Feast day side

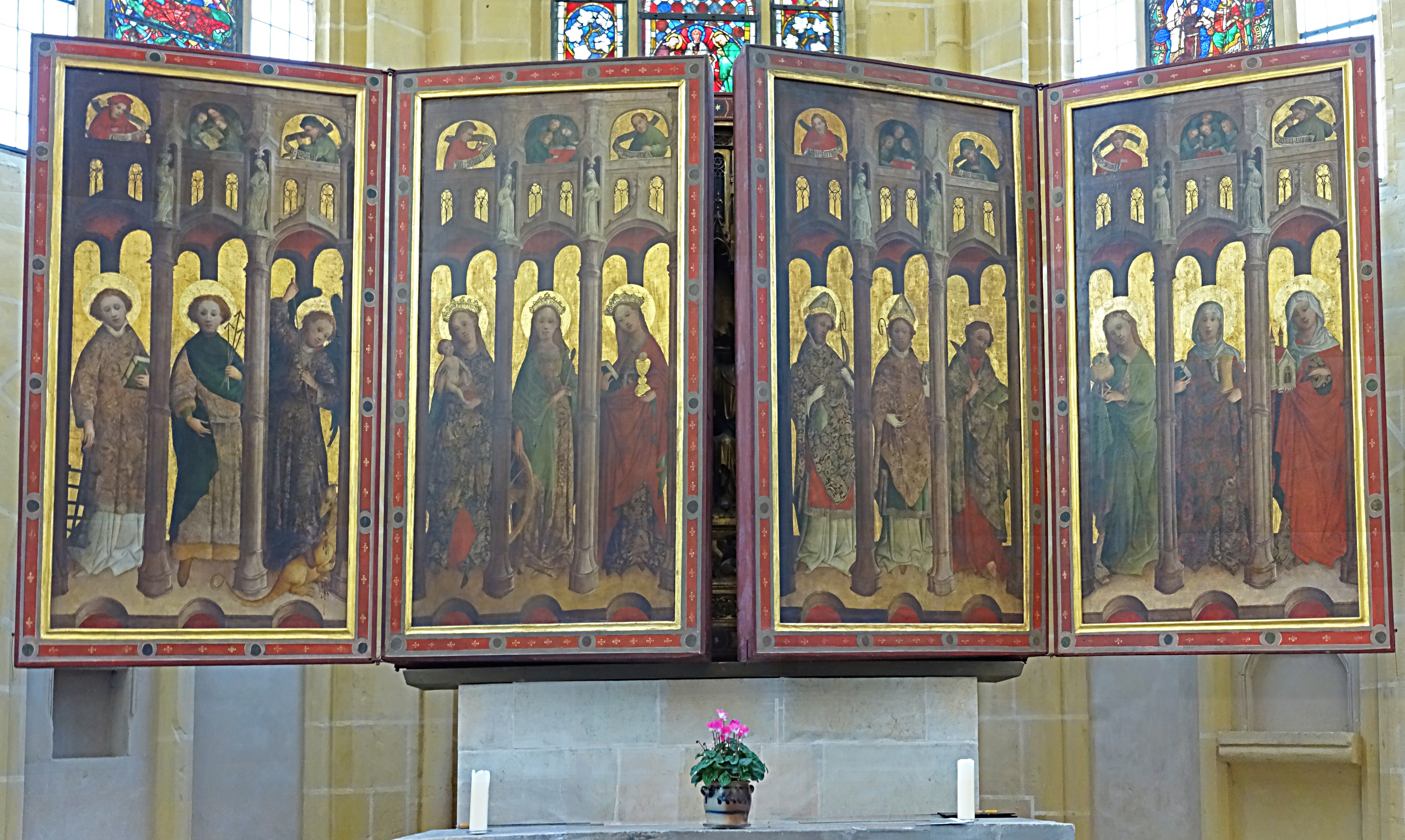
Sunday side

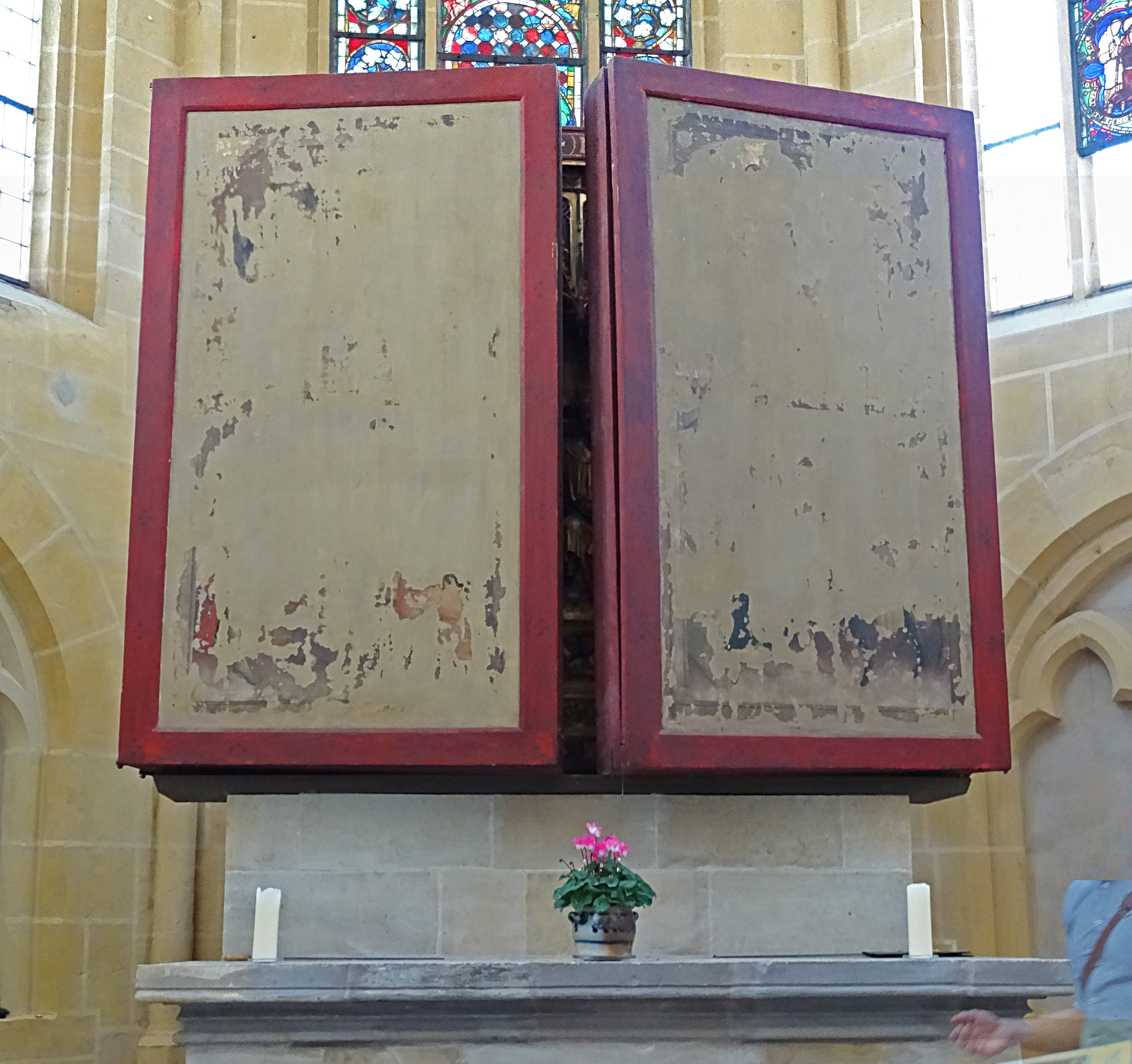
Weekday side

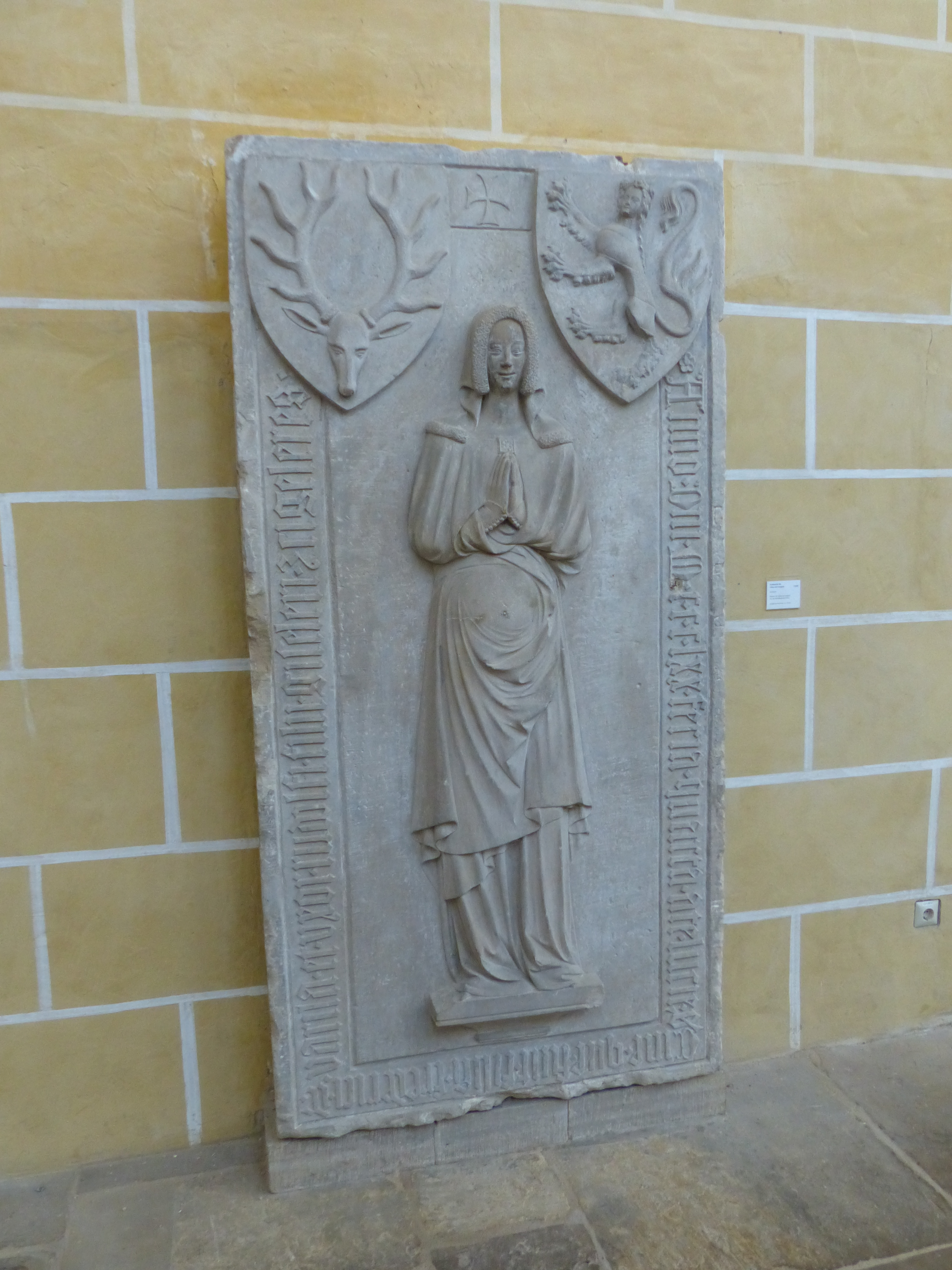
Gravestone of Cinna von Vargula

Also noteworthy are the gravestones of Cinna von Vargula from 1370 with an expressive stylised portrait of the deceased and of the auxiliary bishop Albert von Beichlingen from 1371.

== Bibliography ==
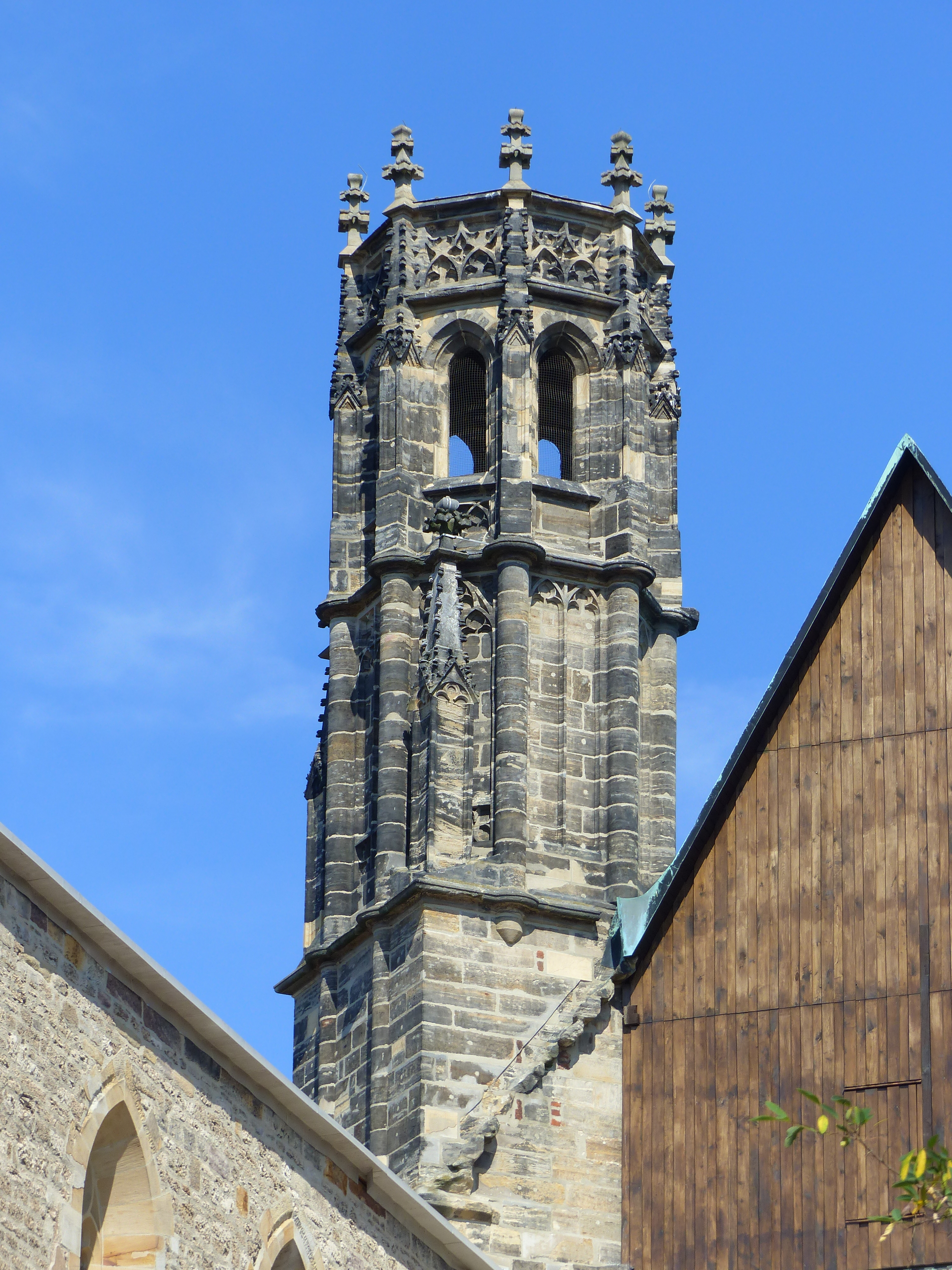
The tower

- Arend-Mai, Otto (1989). Die evangelischen Kirchen in Erfurt (in German). Jena: Wartburg. ISBN 3-374-00936-0.
- Berg, Dieter, ed. (1999). Spuren franziskanischer Geschichte. Chronologischer Abriß der Geschichte der Sächsischen Franziskanerprovinzen von ihren Anfängen bis zur Gegenwart (in German). Werl.
- Bretschneider, Jana (2015). Honemann, Volker (ed.). Predigt, Professur und Provinzleitung. Funktion und Struktur des franziskanischen Bildungswesens im mittelalterlichen Thüringen (in German). Vol. 1: Von den Anfängen bis zur Reformation. Paderborn: Ferdinand Schöningh. ISBN 978-3-506-76989-3.
- Initiativkreis Barfüßerkirche Erfurt, ed. (2014). Ein Bauwerk – zwei Schicksale. Zwischen Verzweiflung und Hoffnung: Die Barfüßerkirche zu Erfurt im 19. und 20. Jahrhundert. Anläßlich des 70. Jahrestages der Zerstörung am 27. November 1944 (in German). Erfurt: Self-published.
- Meier, Ludger (1958). Die Barfüsserschule zu Erfurt (in German). Münster (Westfalen): Aschendorff.
- Schmies, Bernd; Honemann, Volker (2015). Honemann, Volker (ed.). Die Franziskanerprovinz Saxonia von den Anfängen bis 1517: Grundzüge und Entwicklungslinien (in German). Vol. 1: Von den Anfängen bis zur Reformation. Paderborn: Ferdinand Schöningh. ISBN 978-3-506-76989-3.
- Vetter, Uwe (2004). Gemeindekirchenrat der Evangelischen Predigergemeinde (ed.). Die Barfüßerkirche. Denkschrift zur 60. Wiederkehr ihrer Zerstörung am 26./27.11.1944 (in German). Erfurt.
