= Konzertexamen =

German grade

The Konzertexamen is a degree at conservatoires in postgraduate courses of study.

As a postgraduate education degree, it is the highest degree to be awarded by the university. The postgraduate course leading to the concert examination serves to train highly talented students in instrumental or singers skills to become concert-ready soloists. The entrance requirement for the course is usually the Künstlerische Reifeprüfung or the artistic diploma with particularly outstanding performance and an entrance or aptitude test. The concert exam usually consists of two parts: The first part is an internal university event, the second part a public concert. The Hochschule für Musik Freiburg evaluates the examination performances with the grades "passed with distinction", "passed very well", "passed" and "failed". The Hochschule für Musik Detmold and the Hochschule für Musik Saar award only three grades: "passed with distinction", "passed" and "failed". The Hochschule für Kirchenmusik der Evangelischen Kirche von Westfalen awards a Konzertexamen only a "pass" or "fail".

== Information pages on the Konzertexamen degree at various conservatoires (selection) ==
- Hochschule für Musik Freiburg. "Konzertexamen (Informationen zu den Studiengängen)".
- Staatliche Hochschule für Musik und Darstellende Kunst Stuttgart. "Konzert-/Bühnenexamen (Informationen zu den Studiengängen)".
- Hochschule für Musik Franz Liszt Weimar. "Konzertexamen (Informationen zu den Studiengängen)".
