= Verlag Dohr =

Coordinates: 50.927324°N 6.660119°E

Verlag Dohr is a publishing house for music in Bergheim, North Rhine-Westphalia, Germany.

It was founded in 1990 by Christoph Dohr in Bickendorf, which moved to Rheinkassel in 1992 and to Haus Eller in Bergheim in 2010. It publishes a quarterly magazine of music, fermate, sheet music mostly of composers of the 20th century but also works of the 19th and 18th century in critical editions, books and recordings. The publisher provides around 100 new editions per year. It received prizes such as the Deutscher Musikeditionspreis for the edition of Robert Schumann's letters.

Dohr runs in Haus Eller also a museum of historic keyboard instruments. They are presented to the public in concerts and often used for recordings. The museum also contains a library focused on topics such as pianos, keyboard instruments and pianists.

== Authors and composers (selection) ==
Wolfgang Hildemann
