= 2006–07 1. FC Nürnberg season =

1. FC Nürnberg
2006–07 season
- Manager: Hans Meyer
- Stadium: Frankenstadion
- Bundesliga: 6th
- DFB-Pokal: Winner
- Top goalscorer: League: Ivan Saenko (9); All: Ivan Saenko (10)
- Highest home attendance: 47,000 vs Mönchengladbach, Bayern Munich and Hamburger SV
- Lowest home attendance: 28,683 vs Hannover 96
- Average home league attendance: 41,015
Home colours	Away colours	Third colours

The 2006–07 1. FC Nürnberg season was the 107th season in the club's football history.

== Match results ==
=== Legend ===
Win Draw Loss

=== Bundesliga ===
12 August 2006 1	VfB Stuttgart	0–3	1. FC Nürnberg	Stuttgart
15:30 CEST (UTC+02)		Match Report	37' Vittek; 45+1' Schroth; 78' Saenko	Stadium: Gottlieb-Daimler-Stadion; Attendance: 39,000; Referee: Florian Meyer; Man of the Match: Banović

18 August 2006 2	1. FC Nürnberg	1–0	Borussia Mönchengladbach	Nuremberg
20:30 CEST (UTC+02)	Schroth 5'	Match Report		Stadium: Frankenstadion; Attendance: 47,000 (sell-out); Referee: Lutz Wagner; Man of the Match: Schäfer

26 August 2006 3	Bayern Munich	0–0	1. FC Nürnberg	Munich
15:30 CEST (UTC+02)		Match Report		Stadium: Allianz Arena; Attendance: 69,000 (sell-out); Referee: Thorsten Kinhöfer; Man of the Match: Schäfer

16 September 2006 4	1. FC Nürnberg	1–1	VfL Bochum	Nuremberg
15:30 CEST (UTC+02)	Polák 30'	Match Report	10' Gekas	Stadium: Frankenstadion; Attendance: 40,204; Referee: Manuel Gräfe; Man of the Match: Mnari

24 September 2006 5	Energie Cottbus	1–1	1. FC Nürnberg	Cottbus
17:00 CEST	Baumgart 83'	Match Report	10' Mnari	Stadium: Stadion der Freundschaft; Attendance: 16,900; Referee: Michael Weiner; Man of the Match: Mnari

30 September 2006 6	1. FC Nürnberg	1–1	Mainz 05	Nuremberg
15:30 CEST	Polák 24'	Match Report	85' Babatz	Stadium: Frankenstadion; Attendance: 38,004; Referee: Marc Seemann; Man of the Match: Wache

15 October 2006 7	1. FC Nürnberg	1–1	Arminia Bielefeld	Nuremberg
17:00 CEST (UTC+02)	Polák 39'	Match Report	26' (pen.) Böhme	Stadium: Frankenstadion; Attendance: 39,788; Referee: Markus Merk; Man of the Match: Ziegler

22 October 2006 8	Eintracht Frankfurt	2–2	1. FC Nürnberg	Frankfurt
17:00 CEST (UTC+02)	Amanatidis 4' (pen.); Streit 57'	Match Report	5' Saenko; 51' Pinola	Stadium: Commerzbank-Arena; Attendance: 50,300; Referee: Knut Kircher; Man of the Match: Pinola

28 October 2006 9	1. FC Nürnberg	1–1	Borussia Dortmund	Nuremberg
15:30 CEST (UTC+02)	Mnari 59' (pen.)	Match Report	86' Tinga	Stadium: Frankenstadion; Attendance: 46,229; Referee: Peter Gagelmann; Man of the Match: Mnari

4 November 2006 10	Hertha BSC	2–1	1. FC Nürnberg	Berlin
15:30 CEST (UTC+02)	Pantelić 29', 65'	Match Report	47' Banović	Stadium: Olympic Stadium; Attendance: 41,162; Referee: Florian Meyer; Man of the Match: Pantelić

7 November 2006 11	1. FC Nürnberg	1–2	Werder Bremen	Nuremberg
20:00 CEST (UTC+02)	Banović 90+3' (pen.)	Match Report	32' Frings; 79' Diego	Stadium: Frankenstadion; Attendance: 37,174; Referee: Manuel Gräfe; Man of the Match: Naldo

12 November 2006 12	Alemannia Aachen	1–1	1. FC Nürnberg	Aachen
17:00 CET (UTC+01)	Plaßhenrich 90'	Match Report	29' Galásek	Stadium: Old Tivoli; Attendance: 20,800 (sell-out); Referee: Babak Rafati; Man of the Match: Galásek

18 November 2006 13	1. FC Nürnberg	3–2	Bayer Leverkusen	Nuremberg
15:30 CET (UTC+01)	Vittek 12'; Schroth 48'; Saenko 85'	Match Report	8' Madouni; 69' (o.g.) Paulus	Stadium: Frankenstadion; Attendance: 37,143; Referee: Markus Schmidt; Man of the Match: Saenko

25 November 2006 14	VfL Wolfsburg	1–1	1. FC Nürnberg	Wolfsburg
15:30 CET (UTC+01)	Menseguez 74'	Match Report	7' Saenko	Stadium: Volkswagen Arena; Attendance: 16,397; Referee: Lutz Wagner; Man of the Match: van der Leegte

3 December 2006 15	1. FC Nürnberg	0–0	Schalke 04	Nuremberg
17:00 CET (UTC+01)		Match Report		Stadium: Frankenstadion; Attendance: 43,242; Referee: Michael Weiner; Man of the Match: Neuer

9 December 2006 16	Hamburger SV	0–0	1. FC Nürnberg	Hamburg
15:30 CET (UTC+01)		Match Report		Stadium: Volksparkstadion; Attendance: 54,628; Referee: Herbert Fandel; Man of the Match: Schäfer

16 December 2006 17	1. FC Nürnberg	3–1	Hannover 96	Nuremberg
15:30 CET (UTC+01)	Banović 32'; Schroth 56'; Mnari 90+3' (pen.)	Match Report	5' Brdarić	Stadium: Frankenstadion; Attendance: 28,683; Referee: Peter Gagelmann; Man of the Match: Klewer

27 January 2007 18	1. FC Nürnberg	4–1	VfB Stuttgart	Nuremberg
15:30 CET (UTC+01)	Saenko 26'; Greško 51'; Schroth 70'; Magnin 77' (ogg.)	Match Report	33' Cacau	Stadium: Frankenstadion; Attendance: 35,082; Referee: Herbert Fandel; Man of the Match: Saenko

30 January 2007 19	Borussia Mönchengladbach	0–0	1. FC Nürnberg	Mönchengladbach
20:00 CET (UTC+01)		Match Report		Stadium: Borussia Park; Attendance: 33,116; Referee: Babak Rafati; Man of the Match: Nikl

2 February 2007 20	1. FC Nürnberg	3–0	Bayern Munich	Nuremberg
20:30 CET (UTC+01)	Saenko 13'; Schroth 71'; Vittek 86'	Match Report		Stadium: Frankenstadion; Attendance: 47,000 (sell-out); Referee: Michael Weiner; Man of the Match: Wolf

11 February 2007 21	VfL Bochum	0–2	1. FC Nürnberg	Bochum
17:00 CET (UTC+01)		Match Report	88', 90+1' Saenko	Stadium: Ruhrstadion; Attendance: 18,110; Referee: Knut Kircher; Man of the Match: Schäfer

18 February 2007 22	1. FC Nürnberg	1–0	Energie Cottbus	Nuremberg
17:00 CET (UTC+01)	Beauchamp 73'	Match Report		Stadium: Frankenstadion; Attendance: 40,580; Referee: Thorsten Kinhöfer; Man of the Match: Pinola

24 February 2007 23	Mainz 05	2–1	1. FC Nürnberg	Mainz
15:30 CET (UTC+01)	Zidan 20', 27'	Match Report	64' Saenko	Stadium: Stadion am Bruchweg; Attendance: 20,300 (sell-out); Referee: Peter Gagelmann; Man of the Match: Zidan

3 March 2007 24	Arminia Bielefeld	3–2	1. FC Nürnberg	Bielefeld
15:30 CET (UTC+01)	Kucera 45'; Wichniarek 50' (pen.); Böhme 86'	Match Report	16' Banović; 83' Engelhardt	Stadium: Bielefelder Alm; Attendance: 18,444; Referee: Marc Seemann; Man of the Match: Böhme

9 March 2007 25	1. FC Nürnberg	2–2	Eintracht Frankfurt	Nuremberg
20:30 CET (UTC+01)	Spycher 81' (ogg.); Vittek 87'	Match Report	26' Kyrgiakos; 69' Takahara	Stadium: Frankenstadion; Attendance: 44,055; Referee: Florian Meyer; Man of the Match: Kyrgiakos

17 March 2007 26	Borussia Dortmund	0–0	1. FC Nürnberg	Dortmund
15:30 CET (UTC+01)		Match Report		Stadium: Westfalenstadion; Attendance: 80,100; Referee: Knut Kircher; Man of the Match: Galásek

31 March 2007 27	1. FC Nürnberg	2–1	Hertha BSC	Nuremberg
15:30 CET (UTC+01)	Galásek 4'; Engelhardt 60'	Match Report	69' Giménez	Stadium: Frankenstadion; Attendance: 45,649; Referee: Babak Rafati; Man of the Match: Pinola

8 April 2007 28	Werder Bremen	1–0	1. FC Nürnberg	Bremen
17:00 CET (UTC+01)	Rosenberg 75'	Match Report		Stadium: Weserstadion; Attendance: 42,100 (sell-out); Referee: Michael Weiner; Man of the Match: Rosenberg

14 April 2007 29	1. FC Nürnberg	1–0	Alemannia Aachen	Nuremberg
15:30 CET (UTC+01)	Pagenburg 12'	Match Report		Stadium: Frankenstadion; Attendance: 44,298; Referee: Thorsten Kinhöfer; Man of the Match: Rösler

21 April 2007 30	Bayer Leverkusen	2–0	1. FC Nürnberg	Leverkusen
15:30 CET (UTC+01)	Schneider 20', 59'	Match Report		Stadium: BayArena; Attendance: 22,500 (sell-out); Referee: Jochen Drees; Man of the Match: Schneider

28 April 2007 31	1. FC Nürnberg	1–1	VfL Wolfsburg	Nuremberg
15:30 CET (UTC+01)	Wolf 23'	Match Report	17' Krzynówek	Stadium: Frankenstadion; Attendance: 46,200; Referee: Lutz Wagner; Man of the Match: Krzynówek

5 May 2007 32	Schalke 04	1–0	1. FC Nürnberg	Gelsenkirchen
15:30 CET (UTC+01)	Kurányi 64'	Match Report		Stadium: Arena AufSchalke; Attendance: 61,482 (sell-out); Referee: Florian Meyer; Man of the Match: Kurányi

12 May 2007 33	1. FC Nürnberg	0–2	Hamburger SV	Nuremberg
15:30 CEST (UTC+02)		Match Report	39' Van der Vaart; 41' Jarolím	Stadium: Frankenstadion; Attendance: 47,000 (sell-out); Referee: Knut Kircher; Man of the Match: van der Vaart

19 May 2007 34	Hannover 96	0–3	1. FC Nürnberg	Hannover
15:30 CEST (UTC+02)		Match Report	54' Mintál; 62' Engelhardt; 90+2' Banović	Stadium: AWD Arena; Attendance: 49,000 (sell-out); Referee: Jochen Drees; Man of the Match: Schäfer

=== DFB-Pokal ===
9 September 2006 First round	BV Cloppenburg	0–1	1. FC Nürnberg	Cloppenburg
15:30 CEST (UTC+02)		Match Report	58' Banović	Stadium: Arena Oldenburger Münsterland; Attendance: 6,000; Referee: Christian Fischer

25 October 2006 Second round	SC Paderborn	1–2 (a.e.t.)	1. FC Nürnberg	Paderborn
19:30 CEST (UTC+02)	Bröker 60'	Match Report	82' Mintál; 93' Vittek	Stadium: Hermann Löns Stadium; Attendance: 7,028; Referee: Jochen Drees; Man of the Match: Gouiffe à Goufan

19 December 2006 Round of 16	1. FC Nürnberg	0–0 (2–1 p)	SpVgg Unterhaching	Nuremberg
19:30 CEST (UTC+02)		Match Report		Stadium: Frankenstadion; Attendance: 16,676; Referee: Knut Kircher; Man of the Match: Klewer
	Penalties
	Mnari (penalty missed); Pinola (penalty scored); Greško (penalty missed); Sibon (penalty scored)		(penalty missed) Buck; (penalty missed) N'Diaye; (penalty scored) Omodiagbe; (penalty missed) Sträßer; (penalty missed) Page

27 February 2007 Quarter-final	1. FC Nürnberg	0–0 (4–2 p)	Hannover 96	Nuremberg
19:30 CEST (UTC+02)		Match Report		Stadium: Frankenstadion; Attendance: 31,500; Referee: Jochen Drees; Man of the Match: Klewer
	Penalties
	Mnari (penalty scored); Pinola (penalty scored); Polák (penalty scored); Reinhardt (penalty scored)		(penalty missed) Schröter; (penalty scored) Vinicius; (penalty scored) Cherundolo; (penalty missed) Štajner

17 April 2007 Semi-final	1. FC Nürnberg	4–0	Eintracht Frankfurt	Nuremberg
20:30 CEST (UTC+02)	Engelhardt 3'; Saenko 25'; Galásek 54'; Pagenburg 89'	Match Report		Stadium: Frankenstadion; Attendance: 47,000 (sell-out); Referee: Herbert Fandel; Man of the Match: Galásek

26 May 2007 Final	VfB Stuttgart	2–3 (a.e.t.)	1. FC Nürnberg	Berlin
20:00 CEST (UTC+02)	Cacau 20'; Pardo 80' (pen.)	Match Report	27' Mintál; 47' Engelhardt; 109' Kristiansen	Stadium: Olympic Stadium; Attendance: 74,220 (sell-out); Referee: Michael Weiner; Man of the Match: Wolf

== Player information ==
=== Roster and statistics ===
Squad Season 2006–07 Sources:
Player					Bundesliga		DFB-Pokal		Totals	
Player	Nat.	Birthday	at FCN since	Previous club	Matches	Goals	Matches	Goal	Matches	Goals
Goalkeepers
Raphael Schäfer	German	30 January 1979	2001	VfB Lübeck	34	0	4	0	38	0
Daniel Klewer	German	4 March 1977	2004	Hansa Rostock	1	0	3	0	4	0
Defenders
Michael Beauchamp	Australian	8 March 1981	2006	Central Coast Mariners	18	1	3	0	21	1
Gláuber	Brazilian	5 August 1983	2006	Palmeiras	20	0	3	0	23	0
Andreas Wolf	German	12 June 1982	2002	1. FC Nürnberg II	32	1	5	0	37	1
Marek Nikl	Czech	20 February 1976	1998	Bohemians 1905	7	0	2	0	9	0
Matthew Spiranovic	Australian	27 June 1988	2007	Australian Institute of Sport	8	0	2	0	10	0
Javier Pinola	Argentine	24 February 1983	2005	Racing Club	32	1	6	0	38	1
Dominik Reinhardt	German	19 December 1984	2002	1. FC Nürnberg II	30	0	5	0	35	0
Thomas Paulus	German	14 March 1982	2003	1. FC Nürnberg II	5	0	0	0	5	0
Midfielders
Tomáš Galásek	Czech	15 January 1973	2006	Ajax	32	2	6	1	38	3
Jan Polák	Czech	14 March 1981	2005	Slovan Liberec	30	3	5	0	35	3
Ivica Banović	Croatian	2 August 1980	2004	Werder Bremen	25	5	4	1	29	6
Marek Mintál	Slovakian	2 September 1977	2003	MŠK Žilina	13	1	4	2	17	3
Vratislav Greško	Slovakian	24 July 1977	2006	Blackburn Rovers	15	1	2	0	17	1
Jan Kristiansen	Danish	4 August 1981	2006	Esbjerg	20	0	3	1	23	1
Marco Engelhardt	German	2 December 1980	2006	1. FC Kaiserslautern	11	3	2	2	13	5
Jawhar Mnari	Tunisian	8 November 1976	2004	Espérance	23	3	4	0	27	3
Forwards
Gerald Sibon	Dutch	19 April 1974	2006	PSV	10	0	3	0	13	0
Ivan Saenko	Russian	17 October 1983	2005	Karlsruher SC	32	9	6	1	38	10
Markus Schroth	German	25 January 1975	2004	1860 Munich	31	6	4	0	35	6
Leon Benko	Croatian	11 November 1983	2006	Varteks	7	0	2	0	9	0
Róbert Vittek	Slovakian	1 April 1982	2003	Slovan Bratislava	24	4	3	1	27	5
Chhunly Pagenburg	German	10 November 1986	2006	1. FC Nürnberg II	10	1	2	1	12	2

== Kits ==
Home	Away	Away Alternate	Third

Type	Shirt	Shorts	Socks	First appearance / Info
Home	Red / Black	Black	Black	
Away	White	White	White	
Away Alt.	White	White	Red	Bundesliga, Match 24, March 3 against Bielefeld
Third	Navy	Navy	Navy	
