= 2007 DFB-Pokal final =

- Match programme cover
- Event: 2006–07 DFB-Pokal
VfB Stuttgart	1. FC Nürnberg
2	3
- After extra time
- Date: 26 May 2007
- Venue: Olympiastadion, Berlin
- Referee: Michael Weiner (Giesen)
- Attendance: 74,220
- Weather: Mostly cloudy 18 °C (64 °F); 83% humidity

The 2007 DFB-Pokal final decided the winner of the 2006–07 DFB-Pokal, the 64th running of Germany's premier football cup competition. In the final, 1. FC Nürnberg defeated VfB Stuttgart 3–2 after extra time, thereby claiming their fourth title and denying Bundesliga champions Stuttgart a double. A 109th-minute strike from Danish midfielder Jan Kristiansen won the game for Nürnberg.

== Route to the final ==
The DFB-Pokal began with 64 teams in a single-elimination knockout cup competition. There were a total of five rounds leading up to the final. Teams were drawn against each other, and the winner after 90 minutes advanced. If still tied, 30 minutes of extra time were played. If the score was still level, a penalty shoot-out was used to determine the winner.

Note: In all results below, the score of the finalist is given first (H: home; A: away).

VfB Stuttgart		Round	1. FC Nürnberg	
Opponent	Result	2006–07 DFB-Pokal	Opponent	Result
Alemannia Aachen II (A)	4–0	First round	BV Cloppenburg (A)	1–0
Babelsberg 03 (A)	4–2	Second round	SC Paderborn (A)	2–1 (a.e.t.)
VfL Bochum (A)	4–1	Round of 16	SpVgg Unterhaching (H)	0–0 (a.e.t.) (2–1 p)
Hertha BSC (H)	2–0	Quarter-finals	Hannover 96 (H)	0–0 (a.e.t.) (4–2 p)
VfL Wolfsburg (A)	1–0	Semi-finals	Eintracht Frankfurt (H)	4–0

== Match ==
=== Summary ===
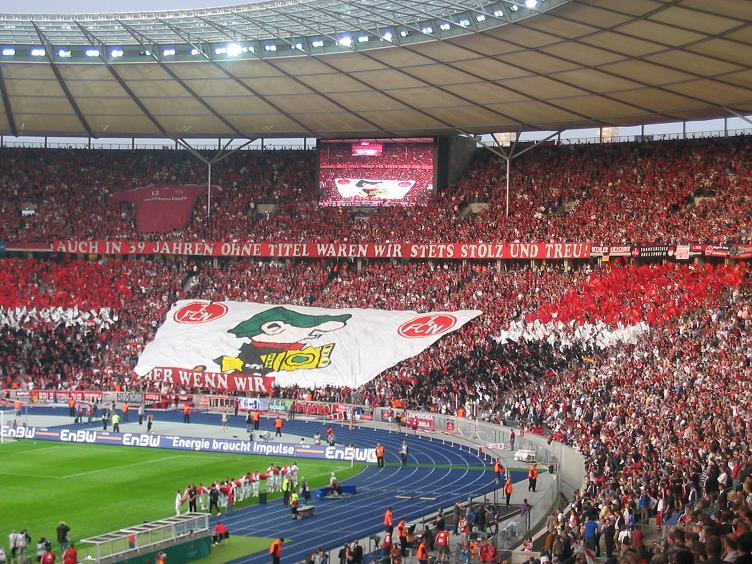
Fans of champions 1. FC Nürnberg in the stadium.

Nürnberg started off strong in the final with a few opportunities, but a mistake by the Nürnberg defence saw Cacau open the scoring for Stuttgart 20 minutes in. Seven minutes later, Nürnberg equalised with a goal from Marek Mintál. The match went to half-time with scores level at 1–1.

Shortly after the restart, Marco Engelhardt headed the ball in to put Nürnberg ahead for the first time in the match. With 10 minutes remaining in regular time, Nürnberg goalkeeper Raphael Schäfer took down Mario Gómez, and referee Michael Weiner awarded a penalty. Pável Pardo converted the penalty to level the match at 2–2. The scores remained level, and the match went into extra time.

In the 109th minute, Jan Kristiansen shot from 28 meters out. The ball sailed over Stuttgart keeper Timo Hildebrand and hit the underside of the crossbar and going into the back of the net to give Nürnberg a 3–2 lead with 11 minutes remaining. The scores remained the same until the end of extra time, giving Nürnberg their fourth DFB-Pokal title.

=== Details ===
26 May 2007
20:00 CEST

VfB Stuttgart	2–3 (a.e.t.)	1. FC Nürnberg
Cacau 20'; Pardo 80' (pen.)	Report	Mintál 27'; Engelhardt 47'; Kristiansen 109'

Olympiastadion, Berlin
Attendance: 74,220
Referee: Michael Weiner (Giesen)

VfB Stuttgart	1. FC Nürnberg

GK	1	(Germany) Timo Hildebrand
RB	3	(Mexico) Ricardo Osorio	(yellow card) 55'	(substituted off) 68'
CB	6	(Portugal) Fernando Meira (c)	(yellow card) 32'
CB	17	(France) Matthieu Delpierre
LB	21	(Switzerland) Ludovic Magnin
RM	19	(Germany) Roberto Hilbert
CM	28	(Germany) Sami Khedira	(yellow card) 67'	(substituted off) 100'
CM	13	(Mexico) Pável Pardo
LM	11	(Germany) Thomas Hitzlsperger
SS	25	(Brazil) Antônio da Silva		(substituted off) 46'
CF	18	(Brazil) Cacau	(red card) 31'
Substitutes:
GK	41	(Austria) Michael Langer
DF	15	(Ivory Coast) Arthur Boka		(substituted on) 68'
DF	35	(Germany) Serdar Tasci		(substituted on) 100'
MF	14	(Sweden) Alexander Farnerud
FW	9	(Switzerland) Marco Streller
FW	16	(Germany) Benjamin Lauth
FW	33	(Germany) Mario Gómez	(yellow card) 118'	(substituted on) 46'
Manager:
(Germany) Armin Veh

GK	1	(Germany) Raphael Schäfer (c)
RB	28	(Germany) Dominik Reinhardt
CB	5	(Germany) Andreas Wolf
CB	7	(Czech Republic) Marek Nikl	(yellow card) 14'	(substituted off) 72'
LB	25	(Argentina) Javier Pinola		(substituted off) 115'
CM	6	(Czech Republic) Tomáš Galásek	(yellow card) 92'
CM	22	(Germany) Marco Engelhardt
RW	13	(Russia) Ivan Saenko
AM	11	(Slovakia) Marek Mintál		(substituted off) 35'
LW	19	(Denmark) Jan Kristiansen
CF	21	(Germany) Markus Schroth	(yellow card) 57'
Substitutes:
GK	18	(Germany) Daniel Klewer
DF	23	(Australia) Matthew Spiranovic	(yellow card) 84'	(substituted on) 72'
MF	8	(Czech Republic) Jan Polák		(substituted on) 35'
MF	10	(Croatia) Ivica Banović		(substituted on) 115'
MF	36	(Tunisia) Jawhar Mnari
FW	35	(Germany) Chhunly Pagenburg
Manager:
(Germany) Hans Meyer

Assistant referees:
Norbert Grudzinski (Hamburg)
Kai Voss (Großhansdorf)
Fourth official:
Babak Rafati (Hanover)

Match rules

- 90 minutes.
- 30 minutes of extra time if necessary.
- Penalty shoot-out if scores still level.
- Seven named substitutes, of which up to three may be used.
