= 2005–06 1. FC Nürnberg season =

1. FC Nürnberg
2005–06 season
- Manager: Wolfgang Wolf / Hans Meyer
- Stadium: Frankenstadion
- Bundesliga: 8th
- DFB-Pokal: 3rd round
- Top goalscorer: League: Róbert Vittek (16); All: Róbert Vittek (16)
- Highest home attendance: 47,250 vs Kaiserslautern
- Lowest home attendance: 16,954 vs Wolfsburg
- Average home league attendance: 30,756
Home colours	Away colours

The 2005–06 1. FC Nürnberg season was the 106th season in the club's football history.

== Match results ==
=== Legend ===
Win Draw Loss

=== Bundesliga ===
6 August 2005 1	Hamburger SV	3–0	1. FC Nürnberg	Hamburg
15:30 CEST (UTC+02)	Mpenza 3'; Barbarez 45' (pen.), 60'	Match Report		Stadium: Volksparkstadion; Attendance: 41,877; Referee: Markus Merk; Man of the Match: Jarolím

13 August 2005 2	1. FC Nürnberg	1–1	Hannover 96	Nuremberg
15:30 CEST (UTC+02)	Mintál 90'	Match Report	8' Brdarić	Stadium: Frankenstadion; Attendance: 28,349; Referee: Peter Gagelmann; Man of the Match: Enke

27 August 2005 3	Eintracht Frankfurt	1–0	1. FC Nürnberg	Frankfurt
15:30 CEST (UTC+02)	Jones 68'	Match Report		Stadium: Commerzbank-Arena; Attendance: 40,000; Referee: Manuel Gräfe; Man of the Match: Jones

10 September 2005 4	1. FC Nürnberg	1–2	Bayern Munich	Nuremberg
15:30 CEST (UTC+02)	Pinola 20'	Match Report	21' Guerrero; 60' Ballack	Stadium: Frankenstadion; Attendance: 46,939 (sell-out); Referee: Michael Weiner; Man of the Match: Lúcio

17 September 2005 5	VfL Wolfsburg	1–1	1. FC Nürnberg	Wolfsburg
15:30 CEST	Klimowicz 15'	Match Report	88' Schroth	Stadium: Volkswagen Arena; Attendance: 15,748; Referee: Knut Kircher; Man of the Match: Jentzsch

21 September 2005 6	1. FC Nürnberg	1–1	FC Schalke 04	Nuremberg
20:00 CEST	Kießling 21'	Match Report	65' Larsen	Stadium: Frankenstadion; Attendance: 25,910; Referee: Lutz Wagner; Man of the Match: Pinola

24 September 2005 7	MSV Duisburg	1–0	1. FC Nürnberg	Duisburg
15:30 CEST (UTC+02)	Kurth 28'	Match Report		Stadium: MSV Arena; Attendance: 19,411; Referee: Peter Gagelmann; Man of the Match: Kurth

1 October 2005 8	1. FC Nürnberg	2–1	1. FC Köln	Nuremberg
15:30 CEST (UTC+02)	Kießling 32', 67'	Match Report	75' Helmes	Stadium: Frankenstadion; Attendance: 27,418; Referee: Thorsten Kinhöfer; Man of the Match: Kießling

15 October 2005 9	Werder Bremen	6–2	1. FC Nürnberg	Bremen
15:30 CEST (UTC+02)	Klose 2', 34', 39'; Klasnić 66', 85'; Borowski 80'	Match Report	16' Kießling; 57' Schroth	Stadium: Weserstadion; Attendance: 39,542; Referee: Florian Meyer; Man of the Match: Klose

22 October 2005 10	1. FC Nürnberg	2–3	Arminia Bielefeld	Nuremberg
15:30 CEST (UTC+02)	Reinhardt 2'; Banović 83'	Match Report	35' Fink; 88' Diego León; 90' Zuma	Stadium: Frankenstadion; Attendance: 20,438; Referee: Lutz Wagner; Man of the Match: Zuma

30 October 2005 11	FSV Mainz 05	4–1	1. FC Nürnberg	Mainz
17:30 CEST (UTC+02)	Paulus 9' (o.g.); Auer 11' da Silva 45'; Thurk 52'	Match Report	13' Kießling	Stadium: Stadion am Bruchweg; Attendance: 20,300 (sell-out); Referee: Manuel Gräfe; Man of the Match: Gerber

6 November 2005 12	1. FC Nürnberg	0–1	VfB Stuttgart	Nuremberg
17:30 CET (UTC+01)		Match Report	10' Tiffert	Stadium: Frankenstadion; Attendance: 25,860; Referee: Florian Meyer; Man of the Match: Tiffert

19 November 2005 13	1. FC Kaiserslautern	1–3	1. FC Nürnberg	Kaiserslautern
15:30 CET (UTC+01)	Blank 18'	Match Report	17' Banović; 78' L. Müller; 81' Saenko	Stadium: Fritz-Walter-Stadion; Attendance: 29,024; Referee: Michael Weiner; Man of the Match: Cantaluppi

26 November 2005 14	1. FC Nürnberg	1–2	Borussia Dortmund	Nuremberg
15:30 CET (UTC+01)	Kießling 88'	Match Report	13' Odonkor; 42' Şahin	Stadium: Frankenstadion; Attendance: 25,928; Referee: Markus Merk; Man of the Match: Odonkor

3 December 2005 15	Borussia Mönchengladbach	0–1	1. FC Nürnberg	Mönchengladbach
15:30 CET (UTC+01)		Match Report	62' Nikl	Stadium: Borussia Park; Attendance: 38,343; Referee: Herbert Fandel; Man of the Match: Cantaluppi

10 December 2005 16	1. FC Nürnberg	1–1	Bayer 04 Leverkusen	Nuremberg
15:30 CET (UTC+01)	Schroth 29'	Match Report	45+1' Schneider	Stadium: Frankenstadion; Attendance: 24,928; Referee: Thorsten Kinhöfer; Man of the Match: Cantaluppi

18 December 2005 17	Hertha BSC	1–1	1. FC Nürnberg	Berlin
17:30 CET (UTC+01)	Madlung 86'	Match Report	55' Saenko	Stadium: Olympic Stadium; Attendance: 30,149; Referee: Babak Rafati; Man of the Match: Schäfer

28 January 2006 18	1. FC Nürnberg	2–1	Hamburger SV	Nuremberg
15:30 CET (UTC+01)	Saenko 67'; Kießling 73'	Match Report	65' (o.g.) Wolf	Stadium: Frankenstadion; Attendance: 23,928; Referee: Manuel Gräfe; Man of the Match: Nikl

5 February 2006 19	Hannover 96	1–1	1. FC Nürnberg	Hannover
17:30 CET (UTC+01)	Štajner 73'	Match Report	56' Vittek	Stadium: AWD-Arena; Attendance: 31,102; Referee: Jochen Drees; Man of the Match: Kießling

8 February 2006 20	1. FC Nürnberg	0–1	Eintracht Frankfurt	Nuremberg
20:00 CET (UTC+01)		Match Report	43' Amanatidis	Stadium: Frankenstadion; Attendance: 22,621; Referee: Markus Merk; Man of the Match: Amanatidis

12 February 2006 21	FC Bayern München	2–1	1. FC Nürnberg	Munich
17:30 CET (UTC+01)	Makaay 28'; Ballack 54'	Match Report	36' Vittek	Stadium: Allianz Arena; Attendance: 69,000 (sell-out); Referee: Knut Kircher; Man of the Match: Ballack

18 February 2006 22	1. FC Nürnberg	1–0	VfL Wolfsburg	Nuremberg
15:30 CET (UTC+01)	Saenko 16'	Match Report		Stadium: Frankenstadion; Attendance: 16,954; Referee: Herbert Fandel; Man of the Match: Saenko

25 February 2006 23	FC Schalke 04	2–0	1. FC Nürnberg	Gelsenkirchen
15:30 CET (UTC+01)	Kurányi 58'; Lincoln 65'	Match Report		Stadium: Veltins-Arena; Attendance: 60,729; Referee: Manuel Gräfe; Man of the Match: Asamoah

4 March 2006 24	1. FC Nürnberg	3–0	MSV Duisburg	Nuremberg
15:30 CET (UTC+01)	Vittek 8', 15', 86'	Match Report		Stadium: Frankenstadion; Attendance: 43,954; Referee: Michael Weiner; Man of the Match: Vittek

11 March 2006 25	1. FC Köln	3–4	1. FC Nürnberg	Cologne
15:30 CET (UTC+01)	Živković 27'; Matip 61'; Podolski 62'	Match Report	6', 16', 22' Vittek; 58' Saenko	Stadium: RheinEnergieStadion; Attendance: 47,500; Referee: Peter Gagelmann; Man of the Match: Vittek

18 March 2006 26	1. FC Nürnberg	3–1	Werder Bremen	Nuremberg
15:30 CET (UTC+01)	Vittek 21', 69'; Schroth 36'	Match Report	57' Klose	Stadium: Frankenstadion; Attendance: 40,924; Referee: Manuel Gräfe; Man of the Match: Vittek

26 March 2006 27	Arminia Bielefeld	0–0	1. FC Nürnberg	Bielefeld
15:30 CET (UTC+01)		Match Report		Stadium: Bielefelder Alm; Attendance: 19,717; Referee: Knut Kircher; Man of the Match: Borges

1 April 2006 28	1. FC Nürnberg	3–0	FSV Mainz 05	Nuremberg
15:30 CET (UTC+01)	Saenko 3'; Kießling 68'; Vittek 79'	Match Report		Stadium: Frankenstadion; Attendance: 44,691; Referee: Thorsten Kinhöfer; Man of the Match: Cantaluppi

8 April 2006 29	VfB Stuttgart	1–0	1. FC Nürnberg	Stuttgart
15:30 CET (UTC+01)	Tomasson 80'	Match Report		Stadium: Gottlieb-Daimler-Stadion; Attendance: 35,000; Referee: Lutz Wagner; Man of the Match: Soldo

16 April 2006 30	1. FC Nürnberg	3–2	1. FC Kaiserslautern	Nuremberg
17:30 CET (UTC+01)	Vittek 12', 87'; Paulus 62'	Match Report	20', 48' Hal. Altıntop	Stadium: Frankenstadion; Attendance: 47,250 (sell-out); Referee: Florian Meyer; Man of the Match: Vittek

22 April 2006 31	Borussia Dortmund	2–1	1. FC Nürnberg	Dortmund
15:30 CET (UTC+01)	Kringe 18', 76'	Match Report	29' Nikl	Stadium: Westfalenstadion; Attendance: 70,700; Referee: Peter Gagelmann; Man of the Match: Dedê

2 May 2006 32	1. FC Nürnberg	5–2	Borussia Mönchengladbach	Nuremberg
20:00 CET (UTC+01)	Vittek 14', 65'; Polák 59'; Saenko 86'; Kießling 88'	Match Report	34' Zé António; 37' Sonck	Stadium: Frankenstadion; Attendance: 42,391; Referee: Michael Weiner; Man of the Match: Saenko

6 May 2006 33	Bayer 04 Leverkusen	2–2	1. FC Nürnberg	Leverkusen
15:30 CEST (UTC+02)	Berbatov 49', 90' (pen.)	Match Report	36' Mnari; 90+2' Kießling	Stadium: BayArena; Attendance: 22,500 (sell-out); Referee: Herbert Fandel; Man of the Match: Nowotny

13 May 2006 34	1. FC Nürnberg	2–1	Hertha BSC	Nuremberg
15:30 CEST (UTC+02)	Vittek 30'; Saenko 86'	Match Report	41' Dárdai	Stadium: Frankenstadion; Attendance: 45,817; Referee: Lutz Wagner; Man of the Match: Vittek

=== DFB-Pokal ===
21 August 2005 First round	1. FC Eschborn	0–4	1. FC Nürnberg	Eschborn
15:30 CEST (UTC+02)		Match Report	11' Mintál; 25' Banović; 27' Mnari; 34' Pinola	Stadium: Sportfeld Berliner Straße; Attendance: 3,500; Referee: Knut Kircher

25 October 2005 Second round	1. FC Nürnberg	3–0	Dynamo Dresden	Nuremberg
19:30 CEST (UTC+02)	Daun 43', 67'; Banović 84' (pen.)	Match Report		Stadium: Frankenstadion; Attendance: 13,762; Referee: Babak Rafati

21 December 2005 Round of 16	Eintracht Frankfurt	1–1 (4–1 p)	1. FC Nürnberg	Frankfurt
19:30 CEST (UTC+02)	Copado 36' (pen.)	Match Report	42' Kießling	Stadium: Commerzbank-Arena; Attendance: 39,000; Referee: Herbert Fandel
	Penalties
	Köhler (penalty scored); Copado (penalty scored); Preuß (penalty scored); Huggel (penalty scored)		(penalty missed) Pinola; (penalty missed) Saenko; (penalty scored) Banović

== Player information ==
=== Roster and statistics ===
Squad Season 2005–06 Sources:
Player					Bundesliga		DFB-Pokal		Totals	
Player	Nat.	Birthday	at FCN since	Previous club	Matches	Goals	Matches	Goal	Matches	Goals
Goalkeepers
Raphael Schäfer	German	30 January 1979	2001	VfB Lübeck	34	0	2	0	36	0
Daniel Klewer	German	4 March 1977	2004	F.C. Hansa Rostock	0	0	2	0	2	0
Philipp Tschauner	German	3 November 1985	2004	1. FC Nürnberg II	1	0	0	0	1	0
Defenders
Benjamin Lense	German	30 November 1978	2005	Arminia Bielefeld	11	0	1	0	12	0
Gláuber	Brazilian	5 August 1983	2006	Palmeiras	12	0	0	0	12	0
Andreas Wolf	German	12 June 1982	2002	1. FC Nürnberg II	20	0	2	0	22	0
Marek Nikl	Czech	20 February 1976	1998	Bohemians 1905	27	2	2	0	29	2
Mario Cantaluppi	Swiss	11 April 1974	2004	FC Basel	32	0	3	0	35	0
Bartosz Bosacki	Polish	20 December 1975	2004	Lech Poznań	4	0	1	0	5	0
Javier Pinola	Argentine	24 February 1983	2005	Racing Club	25	1	2	1	27	2
Dominik Reinhardt	German	19 December 1984	2002	1. FC Nürnberg II	24	1	1	0	25	1
Thomas Paulus	German	14 March 1982	2003	1. FC Nürnberg II	18	1	1	0	19	1
Midfielders
Sven Müller	German	4 April 1980	2004	VfL Wolfsburg	17	0	3	0	20	0
Jan Polák	Czech	14 March 1981	2005	Slovan Liberec	32	1	1	0	33	1
Ivica Banović	Croatian	2 August 1980	2004	Werder Bremen	23	2	3	2	26	4
Marek Mintál	Slovakian	2 September 1977	2003	MŠK Žilina	4	1	1	1	5	2
Adel Chedli	Tunisian	16 September 1976	2004	FC Istres	5	0	1	0	6	0
Lars Müller	German	22 March 1976	2001	Alemannia Aachen	16	1	1	0	17	1
Jan Kristiansen	Danish	4 August 1981	2006	Esbjerg fB	8	0	0	0	8	0
Maik Wagefeld	German	25 February 1981	2004	Dynamo Dresden	3	0	1	0	4	0
Samuel Slovak	Slovakian	17 October 1975	2004	Slovan Liberec	1	0	1	0	2	0
Sezer Öztürk	Turkish	3 November 1985	2006	Bayer 04 Leverkusen	2	0	0	0	2	0
Jawhar Mnari	Tunisian	8 November 1976	2004	Espérance Sportive de Tunis	23	1	3	1	26	2
Sebastian Szikal	German	17 November 1986	2004	1. FC Nürnberg II	1	0	0	0	1	0
Forwards
Markus Daun	German	10 September 1980	2004	Werder Bremen	13	0	1	2	14	2
Ivan Saenko	Russian	17 October 1983	2005	Karlsruher SC	25	8	2	0	27	8
Markus Schroth	German	25 January 1975	2004	TSV 1860 München	29	4	3	0	32	4
Stefan Kießling	German	25 January 1984	2003	1. FC Nürnberg II	31	10	2	1	33	11
Róbert Vittek	Slovakian	1 April 1982	2003	Slovan Bratislava	30	16	1	0	31	16
Chhunly Pagenburg	German	10 November 1986	2006	1. FC Nürnberg II	1	0	0	0	1	0
