= Daniel Klewer =

German former footballer (born 1977)

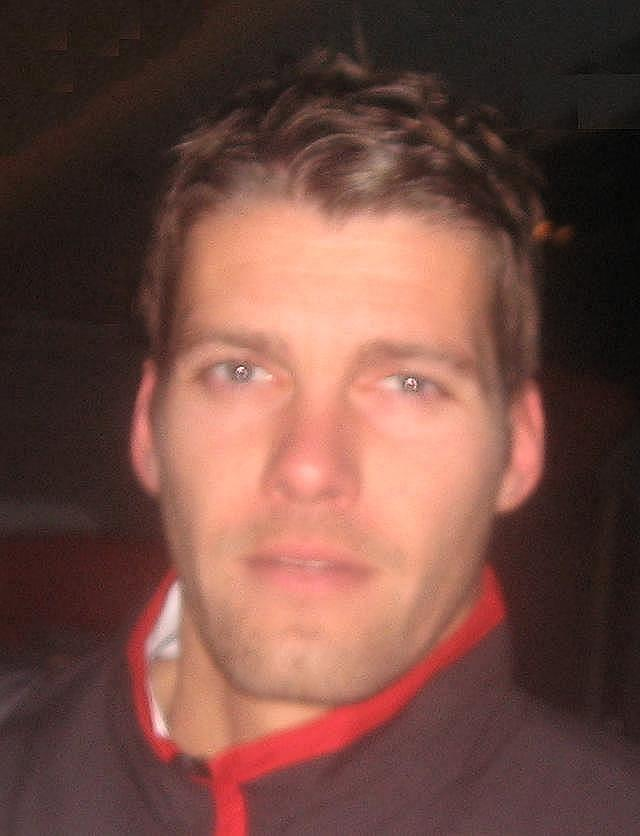
- Daniel Klewer 2006

Personal information
- Date of birth: 4 March 1977 (age 49)
- Place of birth: Rostock, East Germany
- Height: 1.92 m (6 ft 3 1/2 in)
- Position: Goalkeeper

Youth career
- 1983–1997: FC Hansa Rostock

Senior career*
Years	Team	Apps	(Gls)
1997–2004	FC Hansa Rostock	10	(0)
2004–2011	1. FC Nürnberg	16	(0)
Total		26	(0)
- * Club domestic league appearances and goals

Daniel Klewer (born 4 March 1977) is a German former footballer.

== Career ==
Klewer was born in Rostock, East Germany, and joined the youth team of his home team, Hansa Rostock, at the age of six. After going through all of their junior squads, he broke into the first-team squad for the first time in the 1997–98 season sitting on the bench as a substitute goalkeeper for several matches. His first-team debut on the pitch, however, did not come until four seasons later. Before that he had served as a first-choice keeper for Rostock's reserve team and a third-string goalkeeper for the Bundesliga squad.

In March 2002 Klewer played his first Bundesliga game after the first and second-choice keepers were out with injury and suspension respectively. Klewer stayed first-choice for the remaining eight games of the 2001–02 season, which saw Rostock stave off relegation. At the beginning of the following season Klewer stepped back behind regular first-choice keeper Matthias Schober but advanced to a second-string position. He only saw action twice more in 2003–04 season before opting to leave Rostock after twenty-one years of playing for the club.

He joined 1. FC Nürnberg in the summer of 2004 but could not unseat Raphael Schäfer as the starting goalkeeper, playing merely five games in the 2004–05 season when substituting for an injured Schäfer. next season he saw no Bundesliga action at all, playing just twice in DFB-Pokal matches. He reprised his role as replacement goalkeeper once again in the 2006–07 playing in one league game and two cup matches until the end of 2006. In the third round cup match against Unterhaching he saved four penalties in the shoot-out and secured Nürnberg a spot in the quarter-finals. He did a tremendous job in the quarter-final on 27 February 2007 and saved two penalties against Hanover in the shoot-out and brought his team into the semi-finals of the DFB-Pokal.

== Coaching career ==
He work as goalkeeping coach for 1. FC Nürnberg. He started as goalkeeping coach in July 2011 for the reserve team and was there until he was promoted to the first team in July 2014 On 11 November 2014, the day after Valérien Ismaël was sacked, Klewer, along with Markus Zidek, led training for the club.

== Career statistics ==
Appearances and goals by club, season and competition
Club	Season	League			Cup		Europe		Other		Total	
Club	Season	Division	Apps	Goals	Apps	Goals	Apps	Goals	Apps	Goals	Apps	Goals
FC Hansa Rostock	1997–98	Bundesliga	0	0	0	0	—		—		0	0
FC Hansa Rostock	1998–99	Bundesliga	0	0	0	0	0	0	—		0	0
FC Hansa Rostock	1999–2000	Bundesliga	0	0	0	0	—		—		0	0
FC Hansa Rostock	2000–01	Bundesliga	0	0	0	0	—		—		0	0
FC Hansa Rostock	2001–02	Bundesliga	8	0	0	0	—		—		8	0
FC Hansa Rostock	2002–03	Bundesliga	0	0	0	0	—		—		0	0
FC Hansa Rostock	2003–04	Bundesliga	2	0	0	0	—		—		2	0
FC Hansa Rostock	Total		10	0	0	0	0	0	—		10	0
1. FC Nürnberg	2004–05	Bundesliga	5	0	1	0	—		—		6	0
1. FC Nürnberg	2005–06	Bundesliga	0	0	2	0	—		—		2	0
1. FC Nürnberg	2006–07	Bundesliga	1	0	0	0	—		—		1	0
1. FC Nürnberg	2007–08	Bundesliga	10	0	2	0	0	0	1	0	13	0
1. FC Nürnberg	2008–09	2. Bundesliga	0	0	0	0	—		1	0	1	0
1. FC Nürnberg	2009–10	Bundesliga	0	0	0	0	—		0	0	0	0
1. FC Nürnberg	2010–11	Bundesliga	0	0	0	0	—		—		0	0
1. FC Nürnberg	Total		16	0	5	0	0	0	2	0	23	0
Career total			26	0	5	0	0	0	2	0	33	0

== Honours ==
=== Club ===
1. FC Nürnberg

- DFB-Pokal: 2006–07
