= Javier Pinola =

Argentine footballer (born 1983)

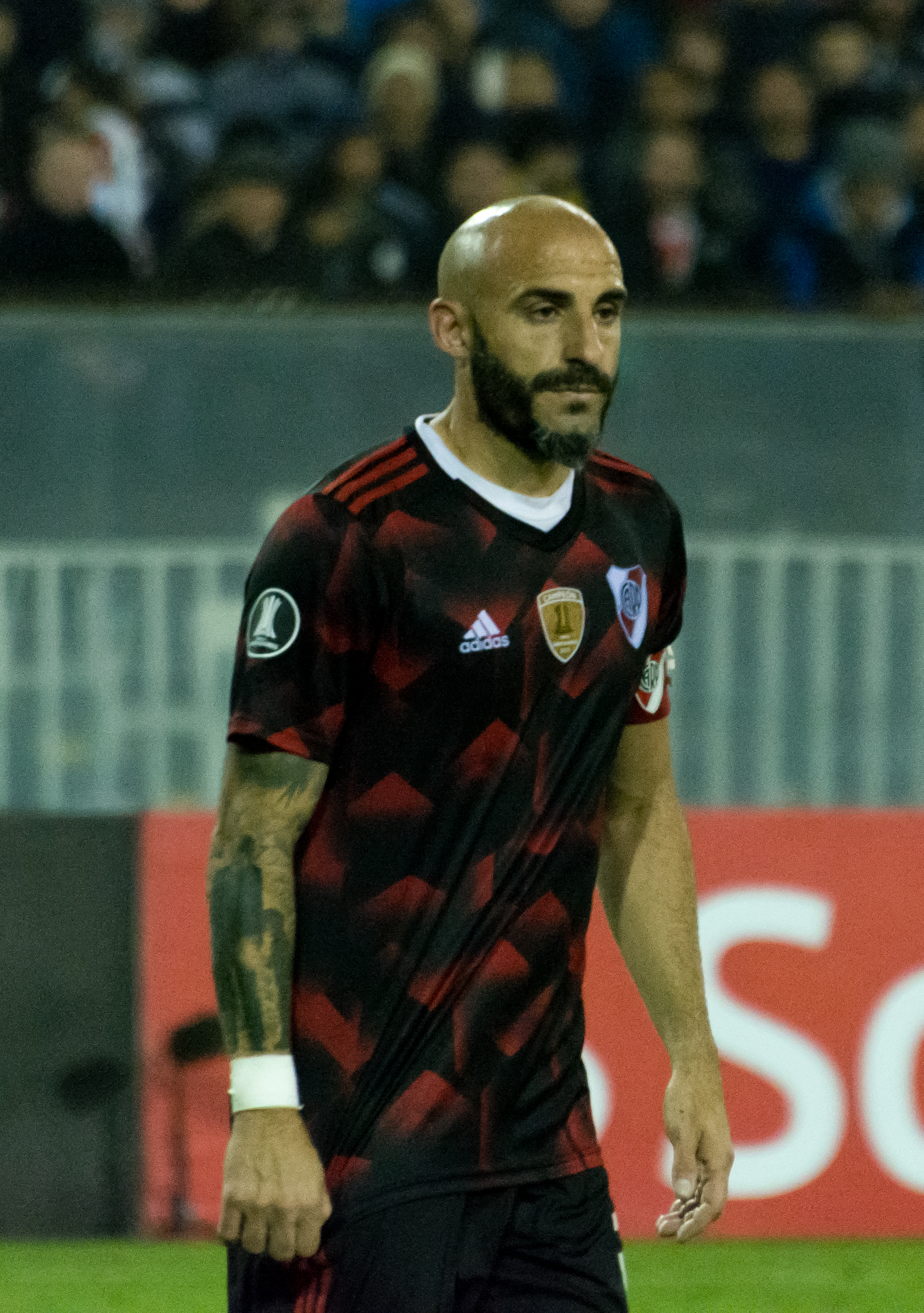
- Pinola with River Plate in 2019

Personal information
- Full name: Javier Horacio Pinola
- Date of birth: 24 February 1983 (age 43)
- Place of birth: Olivos, Argentina
- Height: 1.80 m (5 ft 11 in)
- Position: Left-back

Team information
- Current team: 1. FC Nürnberg (assistant manager)

Youth career
- Huracán Tres Arroyos

Senior career*
Years	Team	Apps	(Gls)
2000–2002	Chacarita Juniors	55	(1)
2002–2003	Atlético Madrid B	13	(0)
2003–2007	Atlético Madrid	2	(0)
2004–2005	→ Racing Club (loan)	54	(1)
2005–2007	→ 1. FC Nürnberg (loan)	57	(2)
2007–2015	1. FC Nürnberg	203	(5)
2015–2017	Rosario Central	40	(0)
2017–2022	River Plate	71	(3)

International career
2007–2017	Argentina	2	(0)

Managerial career
- 2023–2024: River Plate (assistant)
- 2024–: 1. FC Nürnberg (assistant)
- * Club domestic league appearances and goals

Javier Horacio Pinola (born 24 February 1983) is an Argentine professional football coach and a former player who played as a left-back. He is an assistant coach with German club 1. FC Nürnberg. He started his career with Chacarita Juniors in 2000, but spent most of his professional career with Nürnberg, appearing in 286 competitive games and winning the 2007 German Cup.

== Club career ==
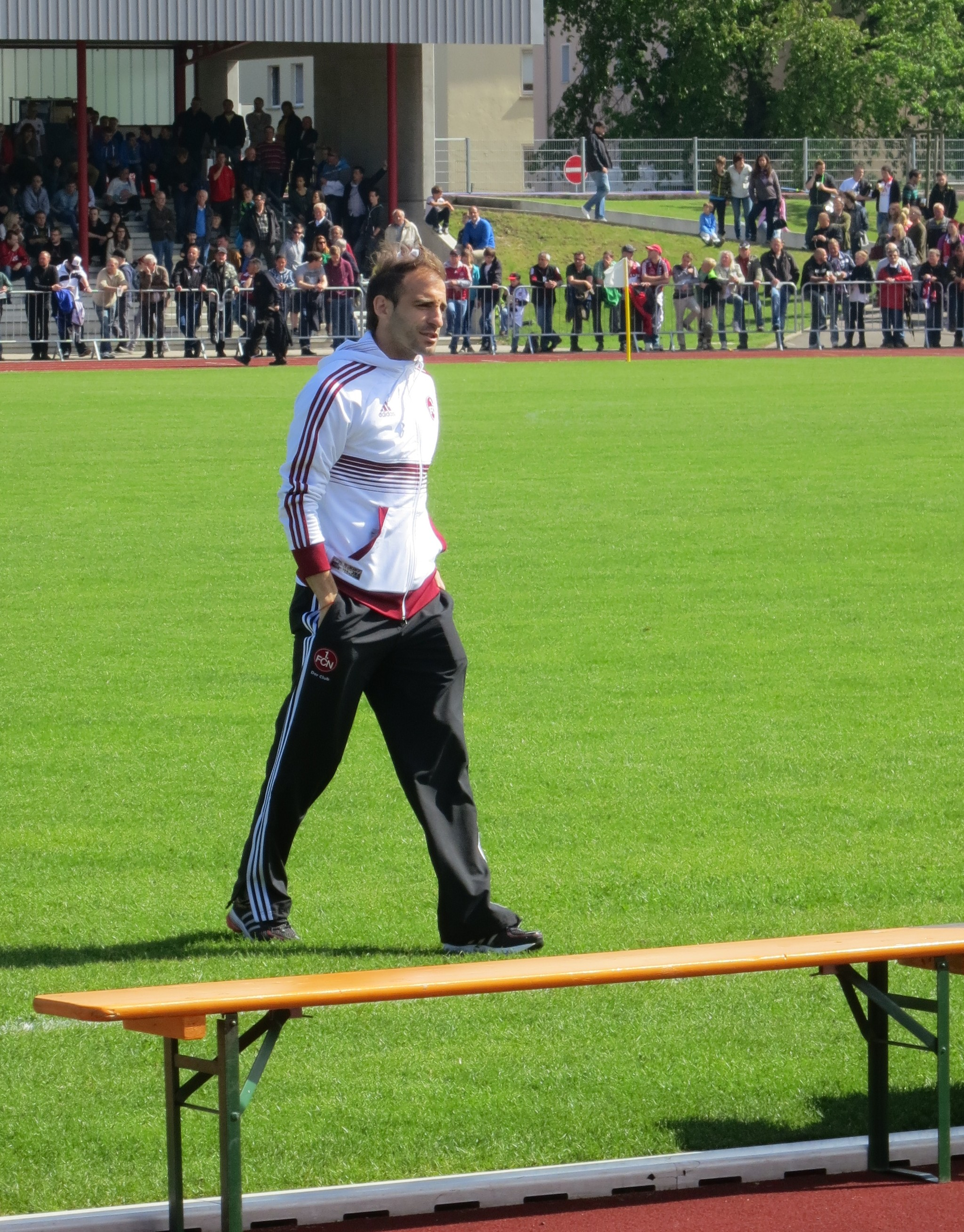
Pinola in training with Nürnberg

Born in Olivos, Buenos Aires Province, Pinola began playing as a senior with Chacarita Juniors in the Argentine Primera División. Two years later he moved to Spain and Atlético Madrid, going on to appear mainly for the reserves and also being loaned two times for the duration of his contract, mainly to Germany's 1. FC Nürnberg.

After solid displays in his first two seasons in the Bundesliga, adding the conquest of the German Cup in his second, to which he contributed with two goals and two assists in six games, Pinola joined Nürnberg on a permanent basis. He played 19 matches in his first year in his second spell, suffering team relegation.

Pinola continued to be a defensive mainstay for the Franconians in the following campaigns, renewing his contract first until 2013 then 2015 but leaving eventually at the end of 2014–15 after rejecting a new offer.

On 24 June 2015, Pinola was presented as a new player of Rosario Central, joining after being convinced by manager Eduardo Coudet.

== International career ==
In 2007, Pinola was selected by Argentina manager Alfio Basile for friendlies with Switzerland and Algeria. He earned his first cap against the latter, on 5 June.

In 2016, following a string of good performances, head coach Gerardo Martino called up Pinola for 2018 World Cup qualifiers against Chile and Bolivia. He played the full 90 minutes against the former, in a 2–0 win in Córdoba.

== Career statistics ==
As of 9 December 2018

Appearances and goals by club, season and competition
Club	Season	League			Cup		International		Other		Total	
Club	Season	Division	Apps	Goals	Apps	Goals	Apps	Goals	Apps	Goals	Apps	Goals
Chacarita Juniors	2001–02	Argentine Primera División	31	1	0	0	0	0	–		31	1
Atlético Madrid	2003–04	La Liga	2	0	0	0	0	0	–		2	0
Racing Club (loan)	2003–04	Argentine Primera División	19	0	0	0	0	0	–		19	0
Racing Club (loan)	2004–05	Argentine Primera División	35	1	0	0	0	0	–		35	1
Racing Club (loan)	Total		54	1	0	0	0	0	–		54	1
1. FC Nürnberg (loan)	2005–06	Bundesliga	25	1	2	1	0	0	–		27	2
1. FC Nürnberg (loan)	2006–07	Bundesliga	32	1	6	0	0	0	–		38	1
1. FC Nürnberg (loan)	Total		57	2	8	1	0	0	–		65	3
1. FC Nürnberg	2007–08	Bundesliga	19	1	0	0	3	0	–		22	1
1. FC Nürnberg	2008–09	2. Bundesliga	33	1	2	0	0	0	2	0	37	1
1. FC Nürnberg	2009–10	Bundesliga	33	0	2	0	0	0	1	0	36	0
1. FC Nürnberg	2010–11	Bundesliga	28	2	4	1	0	0	–		32	3
1. FC Nürnberg	2011–12	Bundesliga	17	0	1	0	0	0	–		18	0
1. FC Nürnberg	2012–13	Bundesliga	28	0	1	0	0	0	–		29	0
1. FC Nürnberg	2013–14	Bundesliga	20	0	1	0	0	0	–		21	0
1. FC Nürnberg	2014–15	2. Bundesliga	25	1	1	0	0	0	–		26	1
1. FC Nürnberg	Total		203	5	12	1	3	0	3	0	221	6
Rosario Central	2015	Argentine Primera División	15	0	4	0	0	0	–		19	0
Rosario Central	2016	Argentine Primera División	11	0	0	0	9	0	–		20	0
Rosario Central	2016–17	Argentine Primera División	14	0	0	0	0	0	–		14	0
Rosario Central	Total		40	0	4	0	9	0	0	0	53	0
River Plate	2017–18	Argentine Primera División	20	3	7	0	11	2	–		38	5
River Plate	2018–19	Argentine Primera División	7	0	5	0	8	0	–		20	0
River Plate	Total		27	3	12	0	19	2	0	0	58	5
Career total			414	7	36	2	31	2	3	0	484	0

== Honours ==
Nürnberg

- DFB-Pokal: 2006–07

River Plate

- Argentine Primera División: 2021
- Copa Argentina: 2016–17, 2018-19
- Supercopa Argentina: 2017, 2019
- Trofeo de Campeones: 2021
- Copa Libertadores: 2018
- Recopa Sudamericana: 2019

Argentina U20

- South American Youth Football Championship: 2003
