= Raphael Schäfer =

German footballer

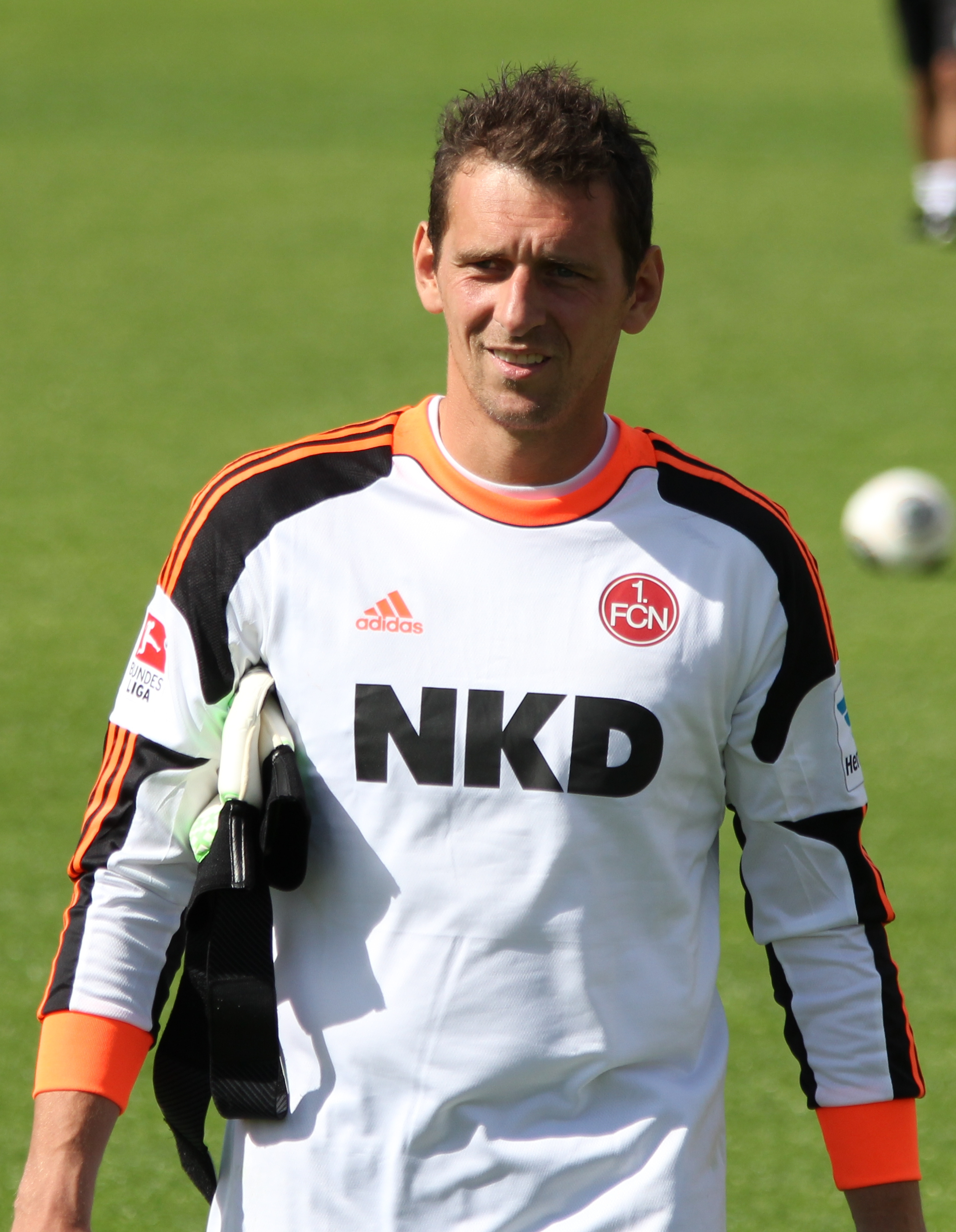
- Schäfer with 1. FC Nürnberg in 2013.

Personal information
- Full name: Raphael Schäfer
- Date of birth: 30 January 1979 (age 47)
- Place of birth: Kędzierzyn-Koźle, Poland
- Height: 1.90 m (6 ft 3 in)
- Position: Goalkeeper

Youth career
- 1987–1991: SC Drispenstedt
- 1991–1998: Hannover 96

Senior career*
Years	Team	Apps	(Gls)
1998–2001	VfB Lübeck	76	(0)
2001–2007	1. FC Nürnberg	130	(0)
2007–2008	VfB Stuttgart	23	(0)
2008–2017	1. FC Nürnberg	228	(0)
Total		457	(0)

International career
1995	Germany U15	4	(0)
1996	Germany U16	4	(0)
1996–1999	Germany U18	10	(0)
- * Club domestic league appearances and goals

Raphael Schäfer (Polish: Rafał Szaefer; born 30 January 1979) is a German former professional footballer who played as a goalkeeper.

== Biography ==
=== Early years ===
Raphael Schäfer was born in 1979 as a member of the German minority in the Upper Silesian town of Kędzierzyn-Koźle and in 1986 with his father emigrated from Poland as Aussiedler to settle in northern Germany. Raphael Schäfer learned German in a few months. Schäfer began his footballing career at SC Drispenstedt in a suburb of Hildesheim. At the age of 12 he was scouted by Hannover 96 and joined the ranks of their youth teams. He became part of the first-team squad with 17 but never made it into the starting line-up.

Thus, he decided to join Regionalliga side VfB Lübeck before the 1998–99 season. At Lübeck he quickly became the first-choice goalkeeper but his team failed to qualify for the 2. Bundesliga in three consecutive seasons.

=== 1. FC Nürnberg ===
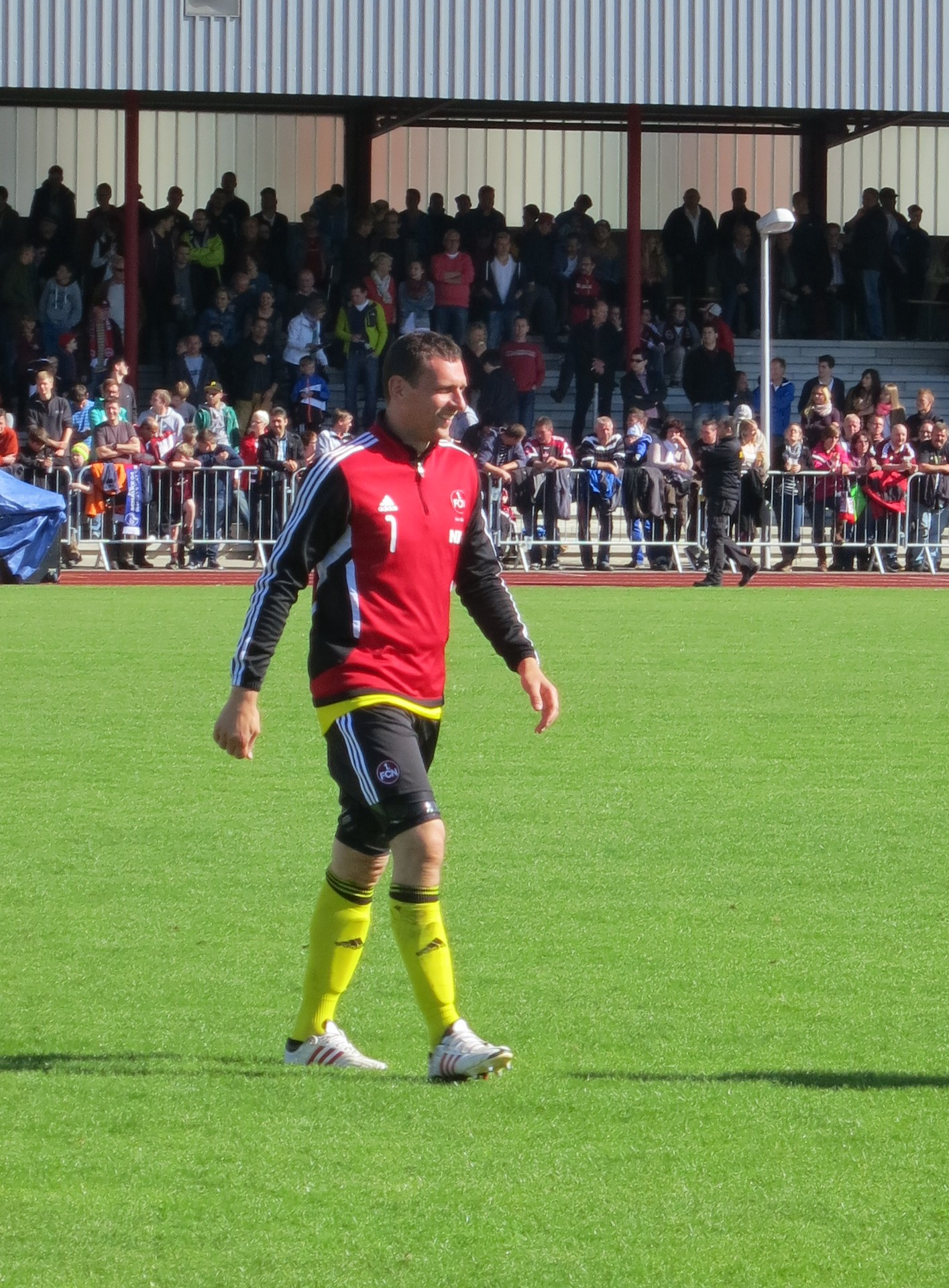
Raphael Schäfer

Schäfer transferred to 1. FC Nürnberg in July 2001. The club had just been promoted to the Bundesliga and he became the second choice goalkeeper behind former German Under-21-international Darius Kampa. When Kampa had a series of weak showings for the team, coach Klaus Augenthaler gave Schäfer the chance to shine in his first Bundesliga game against Borussia Mönchengladbach in March 2002. Despite playing a good game, Schäfer still remained as second choice as Augenthaler still considered Kampa his first choice keeper. When the club was relegated the following year, Schäfer had played three games for the Franconian side.

At the start of the 2003–04 season, Nürnberg were plagued by financial trouble and looking to cash in on several players including Kampa. Manager Wolfgang Wolf appointed Schäfer as the first choice goalkeeper as he expected Kampa to leave the club before August 2003. However, Kampa was not sold but Schäfer remained the number one goalkeeper. He stayed in this position throughout the entire season despite substantial fan backing for his rival, Kampa.

Even after Kampa was sold to Mönchengladbach before the 2004–05 season, which saw Nürnberg back in the top flight, Schäfer still had to fight off skepticism in his abilities from parts of the Nürnberg supporters. He answered his critics by showing substantial improvements throughout the following two seasons and was voted skipper of the Nürnberg team before the start of the 2006–07 season.

=== VfB Stuttgart ===
In July 2007, he moved to Nürnberg's Bundesliga rival VfB Stuttgart, making his debut for them on 10 August against Schalke 04. However, his performances were not as they were expected to be and he could not live up to the expectations. In summer 2008, he was replaced by Jens Lehmann as Stuttgart's number one keeper.

=== Return to Nürnberg ===
In summer 2008, Schäfer returned to 1. FC Nürnberg and immediately became number one keeper again.

== Career statistics ==
Appearances and goals by club, season and competition
Club	Season	League			Cup		Europe		Other		Total	
Club	Season	Division	Apps	Goals	Apps	Goals	Apps	Goals	Apps	Goals	Apps	Goals
VfB Lübeck	1997–98	Regionalliga Nord	1	0	0	0	—		—		7	0
VfB Lübeck	1998–99	Regionalliga Nord	7	0	0	0	—		—		7	0
VfB Lübeck	1999–2000	Regionalliga Nord	33	0	1	0	—		—		34	0
VfB Lübeck	2000–01	Regionalliga Nord	35	0	2	0	—		—		37	0
VfB Lübeck	Total		76	0	3	0	—		—		79	0
1. FC Nürnberg	2001–02	Bundesliga	2	0	0	0	—		—		2	0
1. FC Nürnberg	2002–03	Bundesliga	1	0	1	0	—		—		2	0
1. FC Nürnberg	2003–04	2. Bundesliga	33	0	2	0	—		—		35	0
1. FC Nürnberg	2004–05	Bundesliga	26	0	1	0	—		—		27	0
1. FC Nürnberg	2005–06	Bundesliga	34	0	2	0	—		—		36	0
1. FC Nürnberg	2006–07	Bundesliga	34	0	4	0	—		—		38	0
1. FC Nürnberg	Total		130	0	10	0	—		—		140	0
VfB Stuttgart	2007–08	Bundesliga	23	0	3	0	6	0	1	0	33	0
1. FC Nürnberg	2008–09	2. Bundesliga	34	0	2	0	—		2	0	38	0
1. FC Nürnberg	2009–10	Bundesliga	30	0	2	0	—		2	0	34	0
1. FC Nürnberg	2010–11	Bundesliga	34	0	4	0	—		—		38	0
1. FC Nürnberg	2011–12	Bundesliga	25	0	2	0	—		—		27	0
1. FC Nürnberg	2012–13	Bundesliga	31	0	1	0	—		—		32	0
1. FC Nürnberg	2013–14	Bundesliga	33	0	1	0	—		—		34	0
1. FC Nürnberg	2014–15	2. Bundesliga	14	0	1	0	—		—		15	0
1. FC Nürnberg	2015–16	2. Bundesliga	14	0	1	0	—		2	0	17	0
1. FC Nürnberg	2016–17	2. Bundesliga	13	0	1	0	—		—		14	0
1. FC Nürnberg	Total		228	0	15	0	—		6	0	249	0
Career total			457	0	31	0	6	0	7	0	501	0

== Honours ==
1. FC Nürnberg

- DFB-Pokal: 2006–07
- Promotions to the Bundesliga in 2003–04 and 2008–09
