= Hans Meyer (footballer) =

German football manager (born 1942)

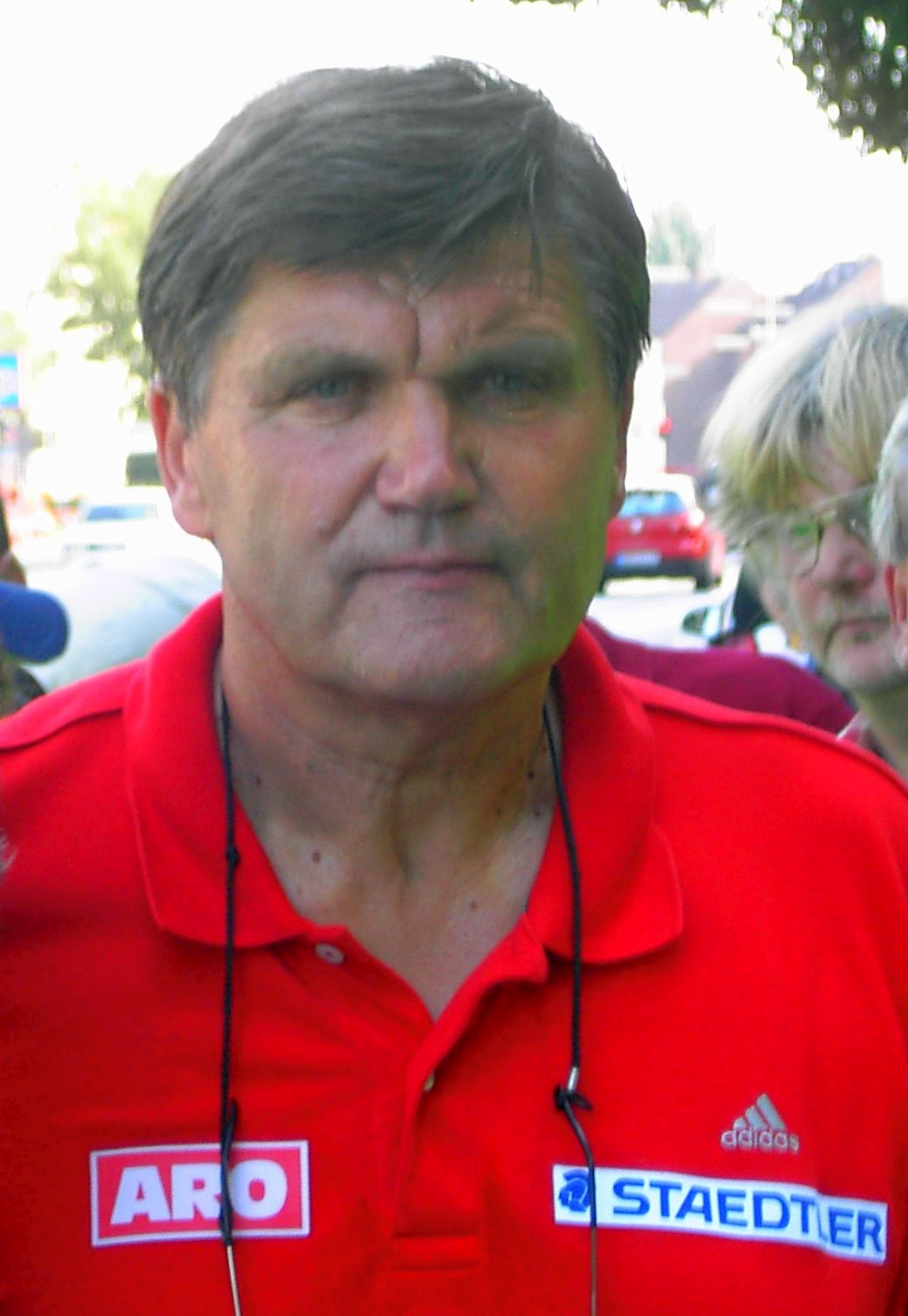
- Meyer as manager of 1. FC Nürnberg in 2007

Personal information
- Date of birth: 3 November 1942 (age 83)
- Place of birth: Briesen, Bilin, German Empire
- Position: Defender

Youth career
- 1952–1956: Motor Dietlas
- 1956–1961: Motor Suhl
- 1961–1963: Carl Zeiss Jena

Senior career*
Years	Team	Apps	(Gls)
1963–1969	Carl Zeiss Jena	30	(1)

Managerial career
- 1971–1983: Carl Zeiss Jena
- 1984–1987: Rot-Weiß Erfurt
- 1988–1993: FC Karl-Marx-Stadt
- 1993–1994: Carl Zeiss Jena
- 1995: Union Berlin
- 1996–1999: FC Twente
- 1999–2003: Borussia Mönchengladbach
- 2004: Hertha BSC
- 2005–2008: 1. FC Nürnberg
- 2008–2009: Borussia Mönchengladbach
- * Club domestic league appearances and goals

Hans Meyer (born 3 November 1942) is a German former professional football player and manager.

== Managerial career ==
=== East Germany (1971–1987) ===
Meyer was born in Briesen near Bilin, German Empire, today Bílina, Czech Republic. He was manager of Carl Zeiss Jena from 1 July 1971 to 23 October 1983. His first match was a 1–0 win against Vorwärts Stralsund on 29 August 1971. During the 1971–72 season, Carl Zeiss Jena participated in the UEFA Cup. They were eliminated by the Wolverhampton Wanderers in the round of 16. In the domestic season, Carl Zeiss Jena won the East German Cup, defeating Dynamo Dresden in the final, and finished fourth in the league. During the 1972–73 season, Carl Zeiss Jena participated in the Cup Winners' Cup. They were knocked out in the second round by Leeds United. They were knocked out of the East German Cup by Hansa Rostock and finished second in the league. During the 1973–74 season, Carl Zeiss Jena participated in the UEFA Cup where they were eliminated in the second round. Carl Zeiss Jena won its second East German Cup under Meyer, again defeating Dynamo Dresden in the final, and finished second in the league. During the 1974–75 season, Carl Zeiss Jena participated in the Cup Winners' Cup. In the domestic season, Carl Zeiss Jena were knocked out of the East German Cup by Dynamo Dresden and finished second in the league. During the 1975–76 season, Carl Zeiss Jena participated in the UEFA Cup, where they were knocked out in the second round. They were knocked out of the East German Cup in the quarter-finals by Lokomotive Leipzig and finished fifth in the league. During the 1976–77 season, Carl Zeiss Jena participated in only in domestic competitions. They got to the semi-finals of the East German Cup where they were knocked out by Dynamo Dresden and finished third in the league. During the 1977–78 season, Carl Zeiss Jena participated in the UEFA Cup. They were eliminated by Bastia in the quarter-finals. Vorwärts Stralsund knocked out Carl Zeiss Jena in the round of 16 of the East German Cup. Carl Zeiss Jena finished fifth in the league. During the 1978–79 season, Carl Zeiss Jena participated in the UEFA Cup, where they were knocked out in the second round by MSV Duisburg. In the East German Cup, Dynamo Dresden knocked out Carl Zeiss Jena in the round of 16, In the league, Carl Zeiss Jena finished in third place. During the 1979–80 season, Carl Zeiss Jena participated in the UEFA Cup, where they were knocked out in the second round by Red Star Belgrade. They won the East German Cup after defeating Rot-Weiß Erfurt 3–1 in the final. Carl Zeiss Jena finished third in the league. During the 1980–81 season, Carl Zeiss Jena got all the way to the final of the Cup Winners' Cup where they lost to Dinamo Tbilisi. They were knocked out of the East German Cup in the round of 16. They finished in third place in the league. During the 1981–82 season, Carl Zeiss Jena were eliminated by Real Madrid in the second round of the UEFA Cup. They finished in fifth place in the league. During the 1981–82 season, Carl Zeiss Jena were eliminated by Girondins de Bordeaux in the UEFA Cup. They were eliminated by FC Karl-Marx-Stadt in the semi-finals of the East German Cup. They finished in third place in the league. He left the club on 23 October 1983. His final match was a 5–0 loss to Dynamo Berlin on 22 October 1983.

Meyer was manager of Rot-Weiß Erfurt from 1 July 1984 to 28 April 1987. His first match was a 1–1 draw against Hansa Rostock on 18 August 1984. Rot-Weiß Erfurt finished the 1984–85 season in sixth place and were eliminated in the East German Cup in the quarter-finals. In the 1985–86 season, Rot-Weiß Erfurt were eliminated from the East German Cup in the round of 16. They finished in 10th place in the league. During the 1986–87 season, Rot-Weiß were eliminated in the round of 16 of the East German Cup. Meyer left the club on 28 April 1987. His final match was a 2–1 loss to Stahl Riesa. Rot-Weiß Erfurt were in ninth place at the time Meyer left the club.

=== East Germany and German reunification (1988–1995) ===
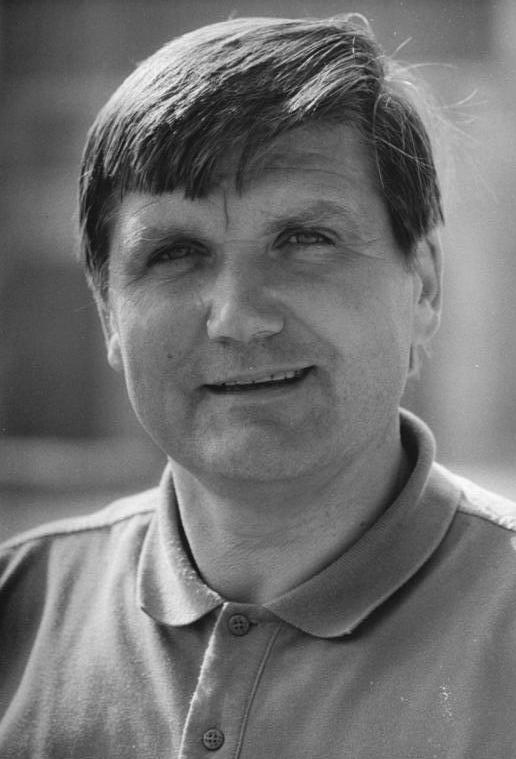
Meyer as manager of Chemnitz in 1990

Meyer was manager of Chemnitz from 1 July 1988 to 9 June 1993. His first match as manager was a 1–0 win against 1. FC Magdeburg on 13 August 1988. Karl-Marx-Stadt finished the 1988–89 season in third place. The club got to the final of the East German Cup. Chemnitz finished the 1989–90 season in second place, losing the championship on the tiebreaker. They also participated in the UEFA Cup, where they were eliminated in the round of 16, and the East German Cup, where they got to the quarter-finals. During the 1990–91 season, Chemnitz participated in the UEFA Cup. They lost both of their first round matches 2–0 to Borussia Dortmund. They were eliminated in the quarter-finals of the East German Cup by Union Berlin. They finished the 1990–91 season in fifth place. German reunification happened late in 1990. Therefore, Chemnitz participated in the 2. Bundesliga. They started the 1991–92 season with a 0–0 draw against 1. FSV Mainz 05 on 24 July 1991. Chemnitz lost 3–1 to Freiburger FC in the first round of the German Cup on 27 July 1991. However, they defeated SC Freiburg the following weekend on 2 August 1991. In the league, they would remain undefeated through the first five matchdays. Chemnitz started the 1992–93 season with a 1–1 draw against Fortuna Düsseldorf on 11 July 1992. They got to the semi-finals of the German Cup where they lost to Hertha BSC II. Chemnitz finished the league season in seventh place. Despite being in the top third of the league table, Meyer left the club on 9 June 1993. His final match was a 2–0 loss to Hansa Rostock on 6 June 1993.

Meyer returned to Carl Zeiss Jena on 2 October 1993 and was there until 27 August 1994. His first match was a 0–0 draw against SV Meppen on 10 October 1993. Carl Zeiss Jena finished the 1993–94 season in 17th place. They finished in the relegation zone; two points from safety. Meyer and Carl Zeiss Jena parted ways on 27 August 1994. His final match was a 5–2 win against Stahl Brandenburg on 27 August 1994.

Meyer was manager of Union Berlin from 25 January 1995 to 2 October 1995. His first match was a 1–1 draw against Sachsen Leipzig on 5 February 1995. Union Berlin defeated Türkiyemspor Berlin 6–0 on 23 April 1995. Union Berlin finished the 1994–95 season in third place. Meyer and Union Berlin parted ways on 2 October 1995 and had his last match against Optik Rathenow on 23 September 1995, which Union Berlin won 2–1.

=== Twente and back to Germany (1996–2009) ===
Meyer was manager of FC Twente from 1 January 1996 to 6 September 1999. His first match was a 3–0 loss to Roda on 20 January 1996. Twente lost 6–1 to Ajax on 9 March 1996. Twente got to the quarter-finals of the Dutch Cup. Twente finished the 1995–96 season in tenth place. Twente started the 1996–97 season with a 3–1 win against Heerenveen on 20 August 1996. Twente finished the league season in third place. Twente were eliminated in the round of 16 in the Dutch Cup. During the 1997–98 season, Twente participated in the UEFA Cup, where they got to the round of 16. Twente finished the league season in ninth place. Twente finished third in the Dutch Cup. During the 1998–99 season, Twente participated in the Intertoto Cup, where they were knocked out in the third round. Twente finished the season in eighth place. Twente were eliminated in the round of 16 of the Dutch Cup. Twente started the 1999–2000 season with a 1–1 draw against Waalwijk on 14 August 1999. Meyer left Twente on 6 September 1999 to join Borussia Mönchengladbach. His final match was a 1–0 loss to Utrecht. Twente had qualified for the second round of the Dutch Cup at the time he left the club.

Meyer was manager of Borussia Mönchengladbach from 6 September 1999 to 1 March 2003. His first match was a 2–1 loss to Alemannia Aachen on 11 September 1999. Borussia Mönchengladbach defeated 1. FC Nürnberg 4–0 on 20 December 1999 during the 1999–2000 season. Borussia Mönchengladbach defeated Mainz 6–1 on 21 May 2000. During the 2000–01 season, Borussia Mönchengladbach defeated Rot Weiss Ahlen, 1. FC Kaiserslautern, Nürnberg, and Duisburg in the German Cup before losing to Union Berlin in the semi-final. Borussia Mönchengladbach defeated SSV Ulm 1846 5–0 on 4 September 2000. Borussia Mönchengladbach defeated Alemannia Aachen 6–1 on 24 February 2001. Borussia Mönchengladbach started the 2001–02 season with a 1–0 win against Bayern Munich. Bayer Leverkusen defeated Borussia Mönchengladbach 5–0 on 9 February 2002. Borussia Mönchengladbach started the 2002–03 season with a 1–0 win against Bayern Munich. The match on 1 March 2003 between Borussia Mönchengladbach and FC Schalke 04 finished in a 2–2 draw. Meyer was dismissed immediately after the match. He finished with a record of 51 wins, 42 draws, and 38 losses.

Meyer was manager of Hertha BSC from 20 December 2003 to 30 June 2004. His first match was a 4–0 loss to Werder Bremen. Hertha defeated Borussia Dortmund 6–2 on 8 May 2004. He finished with a record of seven wins, five draws, and five losses.

Meyer was manager of Nürnberg from 9 November 2005 to 12 February 2008. His first match was a 3–1 win against Kaiserslautern on 19 November 2005. On 2 May 2006, Nürnberg defeated Borussia Mönchengladbach 5–2. During the 2006–07 season, from matchday four to matchday seven, Nürnberg had four consecutive 1–1 draws. On matchday eight, the match between Nürnberg and Eintracht Frankfurt finished in a 2–2 draw for a fifth consecutive draw. On 26 May 2007, Nürnberg defeated VfB Stuttgart to win the German Cup. This made Meyer the only coach having won the East German Cup (FDGB-Pokal) and the DFB-Pokal (former West German and now All-German Football Cup). Meyer was sacked on 12 February 2008. His final match was a 1–1 draw against Hansa Rostock on 9 February 2008. He finished with a record of 33 wins, 31 draws, and 27 losses.

Meyer returned to Borussia Mönchengladbach on 19 October 2008 and was there until 28 May 2009. His first match was a 1–0 win against Karlsruher SC on 25 October 2008. He finished with a record of seven wins, six draws, and 13 losses.

== Managerial record ==
Team	From	To	Record								
Team	From	To	M	W	D	L	GF	GA	GD	Win %	Ref.
Carl Zeiss Jena	1 July 1971	23 October 1983	443	237	86	120	811	510	+301	53.50	
Rot-Weiß Erfurt	1 July 1984	28 April 1987	86	31	30	25	140	114	+26	36.05	
FC Karl-Marx-Stadt/ Chemnitzer FC^{1}	1 July 1988	9 June 1993	184	82	52	50	248	196	+52	44.57	
Carl Zeiss Jena	2 October 1993	27 August 1994	36	9	17	10	37	32	+5	25.00	
Union Berlin	25 January 1995	2 October 1995	27	17	6	4	60	24	+36	62.96	
FC Twente	1 January 1996	6 September 1999	150	69	35	46	235	183	+52	46.00	
Borussia Mönchengladbach	6 September 1999	1 March 2003	131	51	42	38	200	164	+36	38.93	
Hertha BSC	20 December 2003	30 June 2004	17	7	5	5	23	24	−1	41.18	
1. FC Nürnberg	9 November 2005	12 February 2008	91	33	31	27	131	102	+29	36.26	
Borussia Mönchengladbach	19 October 2008	28 May 2009	26	7	6	13	31	45	−14	26.92	
Total			1,191	543	310	338	1,916	1,394	+522	45.59	—

- 1.Same club with two different names.

== Honours ==
=== Player ===
Carl Zeiss

- DDR-Oberliga: 1967–68

=== Manager ===
Carl Zeiss

- FDGB-Pokal: 1971–72, 1973–74, 1979–80

1. FC Nürnberg

- DFB-Pokal: 2006–07
