= Sebastian Szikal =

German footballer

Personal information
- Full name: Sebastian Szikal
- Date of birth: 17 November 1986 (age 39)
- Place of birth: Nuremberg, West Germany
- Height: 1.87 m (6 ft 2 in)
- Position: Midfielder

Team information
- Current team: TSV Aindling

Youth career
- TSV Lauf
- –2004: SK Lauf
- 2004–2005: 1. FC Nürnberg

Senior career*
Years	Team	Apps	(Gls)
2005–2008	1. FC Nürnberg II	75	(7)
2005–2008	1. FC Nürnberg	1	(0)
2008–2009	SV Darmstadt 98	29	(3)
2009–2010	SpVgg Weiden	38	(3)
2011–	TSV Aindling		
- * Club domestic league appearances and goals as of 13:28, 31 December 2010 (UTC)

Sebastian Szikal (born 17 November 1986 in Nuremberg) is a German former footballer.

== Career ==
Szikal made his Bundesliga debut with 1. FC Nürnberg as an 87th minute substitute in a 2–1 home win against 1. FC Köln on 1 October 2005. He later moved to SV Darmstadt 98 and SpVgg Weiden.
