= Marek Mintál =

Slovak footballer and coach

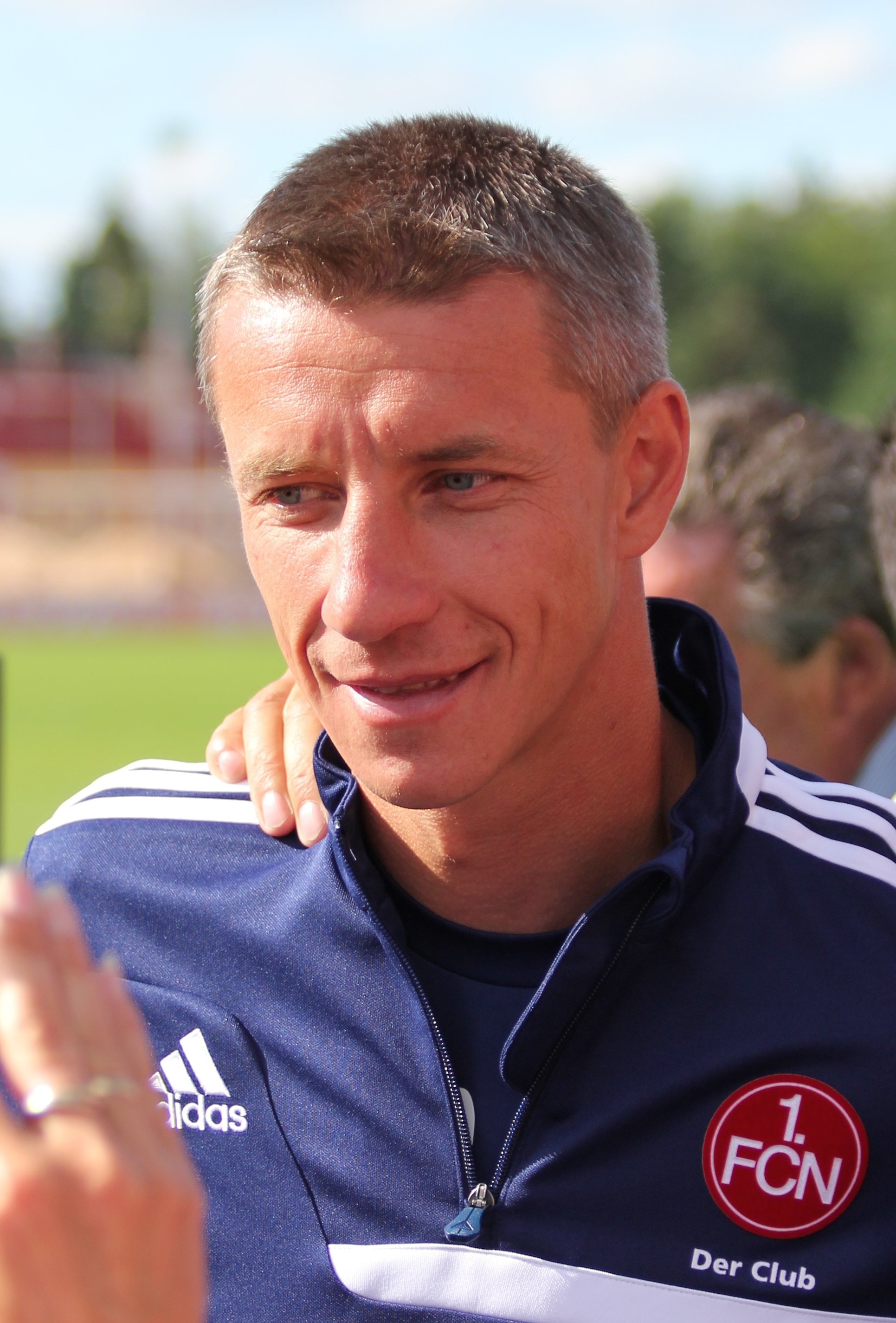
- Mintal in the 2012–13 season

Personal information
- Date of birth: 2 September 1977 (age 49)
- Place of birth: Žilina, Czechoslovakia
- Height: 1.83 m (6 ft 0 in)
- Positions: Attacking midfielder; forward

Youth career
- Žilina

Senior career*
Years	Team	Apps	(Gls)
1996–2003	Žilina	188	(77)
1996	→ Nové Mesto nad Váhom (loan)		
2003–2011	1. FC Nürnberg	180	(66)
2011–2012	Hansa Rostock	24	(6)
2012–2013	1. FC Nürnberg II	29	(11)
Total		421	(160)

International career
2002–2009	Slovakia	45	(14)

Managerial career
- 2013–2015: 1. FC Nürnberg (assistant)
- 2019–2021: 1. FC Nürnberg II
- 2019: 1. FC Nürnberg (interim)
- 2020–2022: Slovakia (assistant)
- 2022–2023: Slovakia U19 (assistant)
- 2023–2024: SpVgg Bayreuth
- * Club domestic league appearances and goals

Marek Mintál (Slovak pronunciation: [ˈmarek ˈmintaːl]; born 2 September 1977) is a Slovak professional football coach and a former player who played as an attacking midfielder or forward.

== Playing career ==
Mintál started to play football in Slovak club MŠK Žilina, with whom he won back-to-back Slovak championships in 2001–02 and 2002–03. This was also due to his scoring 20 (2001–02) and 21 (2002–03) goals respectively. With this number of goals he also became the Slovak top scorer in both seasons. Therefore, he was capped for the Slovak national team for the first time on 6 February 2002. He has won 33 caps and scored 11 goals for the Slovak national team.

After the 2002–03 season, he was transferred to 1. FC Nürnberg for an alleged transfer fee of €100,000 and an agreement that should Mintál be transferred again, MŠK Žilina would receive a portion of the transfer fee. His new club was playing in the 2. Bundesliga at this time. He continued his scoring run by scoring 18 goals and becoming the German second division's leading scorer and was a crucial part of Nürnberg's immediate promotion. During that season, Mintál, an offensive midfielder, became widely regarded for his inconspicuous style of play, which has led to him being called "stealth bomber", "Sniper" or "Phantom". In the following year, Mintál led the Bundesliga in scoring with 24 goals, and helped Nürnberg stave off relegation.

His continuous success in scoring goals sparked rumours that he might move to a bigger club during the 2005 summer break. He had been linked in transfer speculation with Liverpool, Beşiktaş, Villarreal and VfB Stuttgart. These rumours did not lead to a transfer and Mintal decided to stay at Nürnberg. However the following season turned out to be disastrous for the Slovak striker who broke his foot twice in the span of five months. Thus, the offensive midfielder only played in four games and scored just a single goal.

He celebrated his competitive comeback against Borussia Mönchengladbach when coming on as a substitute after 60 minutes. Two weeks later, he also played for his country again, scoring two goals against Cyprus. Later the same year, he was troubled again by his broken foot and had to undergo surgery for a second time.

Mintál won the DFB-Pokal with 1. FC Nürnberg in the year 2007. In this game, he also scored a goal, during this match, he was injured by Fernando Meira, a Portuguese defender from VfB Stuttgart. 1. FC Nürnberg won the game 3–2 after extra time. He scored a brace in a UEFA Cup match against AZ to keep their European dreams alive.

His player career ended in 2013.

== Coaching career ==
For the 2013–14 season until October 2014, he assisted his former team 1. FC Nürnberg in coaching before transferring to Slovakia to complete his coaching license. Mintál returned to Nürnberg as assistant coach for the 2015–16 season and is currently also assistant coach of its U19 team. On 12 February 2019 he was named interim assistant coach of the first team. He was promoted as the head coach on 4 November 2019 for one game.

== Career statistics ==
=== Club ===
Appearances and goals by club, season and competition
Club	Season	League			Cup		Continental		Other		Total	
Club	Season	Division	Apps	Goals	Apps	Goals	Apps	Goals	Apps	Goals	Apps	Goals
Žilina	1996–97	Super Liga	9	3			—		—		9	3
Žilina	1997–98	Super Liga	28	2			1 (Note: Appearance in the Intertoto Cup)	0	—		29	2
Žilina	1998–99	Super Liga	28	11			—		—		28	11
Žilina	1999–2000	Super Liga	29	12			—		—		29	12
Žilina	2000–01	Super Liga	27	7			—		—		27	7
Žilina	2001–02	Super Liga	34	21			—		—		34	21
Žilina	2002–03	Super Liga	31	20			2 (Note: Appearance in the Champions League)	0	—		33	20
Žilina	Total		188	77			3	0	—		191	77
1. FC Nürnberg	2003–04	2. Bundesliga	31	18	2	0	—		—		33	18
1. FC Nürnberg	2004–05	Bundesliga	34	24	1	1	—		—		35	25
1. FC Nürnberg	2005–06	Bundesliga	4	1	1	1	—		—		5	2
1. FC Nürnberg	2006–07	Bundesliga	13	1	4	2	—		—		17	3
1. FC Nürnberg	2007–08	Bundesliga	31	5	2	0	6 (Note: Appearances in the UEFA Cup)	3	1 (Note: Appearances in the German League Cup)	0	40	8
1. FC Nürnberg	2008–09	2. Bundesliga	28	16	2	0	—		2 (Note: Appearances in the 2. Bundesliga Promotion Playoff)	1	32	17
1. FC Nürnberg	2009–10	Bundesliga	22	1	2	1	—		2 (Note: Appearances in the Bundesliga Relegation)	0	26	2
1. FC Nürnberg	2010–11	Bundesliga	17	0	3	0	—		—		20	0
1. FC Nürnberg	Total		180	66	17	5	6	3	5	1	208	75
Hansa Rostock	2011–12	2. Bundesliga	24	6	1	0	—		—		25	6
1. FC Nürnberg II	2012–13	Regionalliga Bayern	30	11	—		—		—		30	11
Career total			422	160	18	5	9	3	5	1	454	169

=== International ===
Scores and results list Slovakia's goal tally first, score column indicates score after each Mintál goal.

List of international goals scored by Marek Mintál
No.	Date	Venue	Opponent	Score	Result	Competition
1	6 February 2002	Azadi Stadium, Tehran, Iran	Iran		3–2	Friendly
2	14 May 2002	Tatran Stadium, Prešov, Slovakia	Uzbekistan		4–1	Friendly
3	31 March 2004	Tehelné pole, Bratislava, Slovakia	Austria		1–1	Friendly
4	8 September 2004	Tehelné pole, Bratislava, Slovakia	Liechtenstein		7–0	FIFA World Cup 2006 qualification
5	26 March 2005	A. Le Coq Arena, Tallinn, Estonia	Estonia		2–1	FIFA World Cup 2006 qualification
6	8 June 2005	Stade Josy Barthel, Luxembourg, Luxembourg	Luxembourg		4–0	FIFA World Cup 2006 qualification
7	2 September 2006	Tehelné pole, Bratislava, Slovakia	Cyprus		6–1	UEFA Euro 2008 qualification
8	2 September 2006	Tehelné pole, Bratislava, Slovakia	Cyprus		6–1	UEFA Euro 2008 qualification
9	7 October 2006	Millennium Stadium, Cardiff, Wales	Wales		5–1	UEFA Euro 2008 qualification
10	7 October 2006	Millennium Stadium, Cardiff, Wales	Wales		5–1	UEFA Euro 2008 qualification
11	15 November 2006	Štadión pod Dubňom, Žilina, Slovakia	Bulgaria		3–1	Friendly
12	12 September 2007	Štadión Antona Malatinského, Trnava, Slovakia	Wales		2–5	UEFA Euro 2008 qualification
13	12 September 2007	Štadión Antona Malatinského, Trnava, Slovakia	Wales		2–5	UEFA Euro 2008 qualification
14	26 March 2008	Štadión Zlaté Moravce, Zlaté Moravce, Slovakia	Iceland		1–2	Friendly

== Honours ==
As of 15 January 2011

MŠK Žilina

- Slovak First Football League: 2001–02, 2002–03
- Slovak Super Cup: 2003

1. FC Nürnberg

- DFB-Pokal: 2006–07
- 2. Bundesliga: 2003–04

Individual

- Slovak First Football League top scorer: 2001–02, 2002–03
- 2. Bundesliga top scorer: 2003–04, 2008–09
- Slovak Footballer of the Year: 2004, 2005
- Slovak Footballer of the Decade (2000–2009)
- German Bundesliga top scorer: 2005
