= Marc Gouiffe à Goufan =

Cameroonian footballer

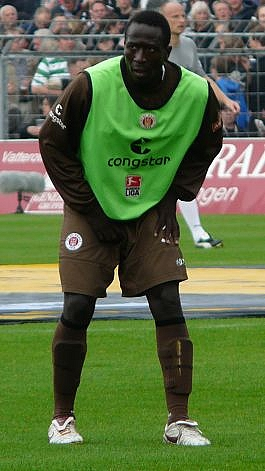
- Gouiffe à Goufan with FC St. Pauli

Personal information
- Date of birth: 12 April 1984 (age 42)
- Place of birth: Binguela, Cameroon
- Height: 1.80 m (5 ft 11 in)
- Position: Defender

Senior career*
Years	Team	Apps	(Gls)
–2002	Sahel FC		
2002–2005	VfL Wolfsburg II	29	(0)
2005–2008	SC Paderborn	80	(2)
2008–2010	FC St. Pauli	7	(0)
2009–2010	FC St. Pauli II	2	(0)
2010–2011	Eintracht Trier	6	(0)
2012–2013	Rapid Ghidighici	15	(0)
2015–2018	FC Wettswil-Bonstetten	86	(2)
Total		223	(4)

International career
2003	Cameroon	1	(0)
- * Club domestic league appearances and goals

Marc Gouiffe à Goufan (born 12 April 1984) is a Cameroonian former professional footballer who played as a defender.

== Career ==
Gouiffe à Goufan made his debut on the professional league level in the 2. Bundesliga for SC Paderborn 07 on 7 August 2005 when he came on as a substitute in the 67th minute in a game against SpVgg Unterhaching.
