= Ivan Saenko =

Russian footballer

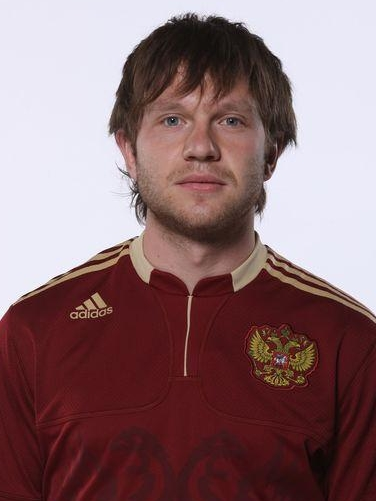
- Saenko in 2009

Personal information
- Full name: Ivan Ivanovich Saenko
- Date of birth: 17 October 1983 (age 43)
- Place of birth: Maslovka, Voronezh Oblast, Russian SFSR, Soviet Union
- Height: 1.77 m (5 ft 10 in)
- Position: Winger

Senior career*
Years	Team	Apps	(Gls)
2001–2005	Karlsruher SC	86	(21)
2002	→ Fakel Voronezh (loan)	13	(4)
2005–2008	1. FC Nürnberg	83	(18)
2008–2010	Spartak Moscow	31	(1)
Total		213	(44)

International career
2003–2005	Russia U-21	18	(7)
2006–2008	Russia	13	(0)
- * Club domestic league appearances and goals

Ivan Ivanovich Saenko (Russian: Иван Иванович Саенко; born 17 October 1983) is a Russian former professional footballer who played as a winger.

== Club career ==
Saenko was born in Maslovka. In August 2008, Saenko moved to Spartak Moscow due to his unwillingness to play in the second division after 1. FC Nürnberg's relegation. He missed the second half of the 2009 season due to injuries. Saenko had never found himself a new team and retired in 2011.

== International career ==
After finished second in qualifying group stage with Russia U-21 at the 2006 UEFA European Under-21 Football Championship, Saenko received first senior call up against Croatia on 6 September 2006 and as unused bench. He made his debut one month later against Estonia on 11 October 2006 as last minutes substitution.

He was called up to Russia's UEFA Euro 2008 squad and was a second-half substitute in both their second match against Greece in Salzburg and third match against Sweden in Innsbruck, but started the quarter-final against the Netherlands in Basel and the semi-final against Spain in Vienna. He won his 13th and final cap in October 2008.

== Career statistics ==
=== Club ===
Appearances and goals by club, season and competition
Club	League	Season	League		Cup		Europe		Total	
Club	League	Season	Apps	Goals	Apps	Goals	Apps	Goals	Apps	Goals
Karlsruher SC	2. Bundesliga	2001–02	2	0	0	0	—		2	0
Karlsruher SC	2. Bundesliga	2002–03	29	6	1	0	—		30	6
Karlsruher SC	2. Bundesliga	2003–04	29	10	2	0	—		31	10
Karlsruher SC	2. Bundesliga	2004–05	26	5	3	1	—		29	6
Karlsruher SC	Total		86	21	6	1	0	0	92	22
Fakel Voronezh (loan)	Russian First Division	2002	13	4	0	0	—		13	4
1. FC Nürnberg	Bundesliga	2005–06	25	8	2	0	—		27	8
1. FC Nürnberg	Bundesliga	2006–07	32	9	6	1	—		38	10
1. FC Nürnberg	Bundesliga	2007–08	26	1	3	0	7	2	36	3
1. FC Nürnberg	Total		83	18	11	1	7	2	101	21
Spartak Moscow	Russian Premier League	2008	8	0	1	0	6	1	15	1
Spartak Moscow	Russian Premier League	2009	13	1	1	0	—		14	1
Spartak Moscow	Russian Premier League	2010	10	0	0	0	0	0	10	0
Spartak Moscow	Total		31	1	2	0	6	1	39	2
Career total			213	44	19	2	13	3	245	49

=== International ===
Appearances and goals by national team and year
National team	Year	Apps	Goals
Russia	2006	1	0
Russia	2007	4	0
Russia	2008	8	0
Total		13	0

== Honours ==
1. FC Nürnberg

- DFB-Pokal: 2006–07

Russia

- UEFA European Championship bronze medalist: 2008
