= Jan Polák =

Czech footballer

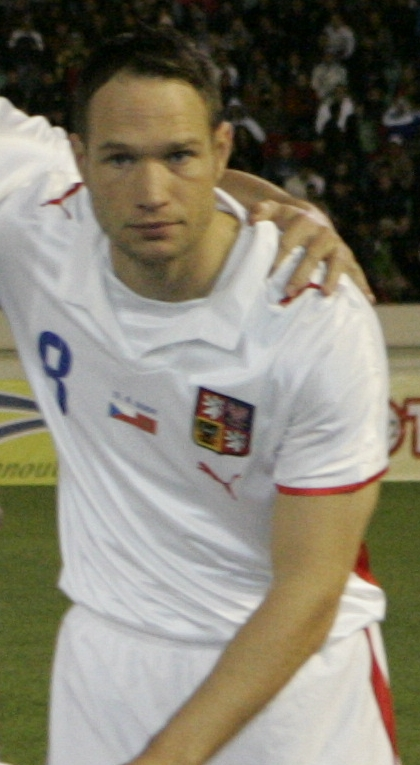
- Polák playing for the Czech national team

Personal information
- Full name: Jan Polák
- Date of birth: 14 March 1981 (age 45)
- Place of birth: Brno, Czechoslovakia
- Height: 1.81 m (5 ft 11 in)
- Position: Central midfielder

Youth career
- Tatran Bohunice
- 1991–1998: Zbrojovka Brno

Senior career*
Years	Team	Apps	(Gls)
1998–2002	Zbrojovka Brno	124	(5)
2003–2005	Slovan Liberec	65	(5)
2005–2007	1. FC Nürnberg	62	(4)
2007–2011	Anderlecht	79	(5)
2011–2014	VfL Wolfsburg	73	(2)
2014–2016	1. FC Nürnberg	39	(2)
2016–2018	Zbrojovka Brno	48	(3)
2018–2020	Prostějov	36	(0)
Total		526	(26)

International career
1999–2003	Czech Republic U21	45	(0)
1999–2011	Czech Republic	57	(7)
Medal record
Men's football
Representing Czech Republic
UEFA European Under-21 Championship
Winner	2002 Switzerland
- * Club domestic league appearances and goals as of 20 May 2018

Jan Polák (Czech pronunciation: [ˈjan ˈpolaːk]; born 14 March 1981) is a retired Czech footballer who played as a midfielder. His professional career spanned 22 years, during which he also played abroad for football clubs in Germany and Belgium.

Polák also represented the Czech Republic national football team at the 2006 FIFA World Cup and UEFA Euro 2008.

== Career ==
In his younger days he played for FC Zbrojovka Brno and Tatran Bohunice. Formerly a member of the Czech national under-21 side, Polák, alongside players like Petr Čech and Milan Baroš, was a part of the team which won the European Under-21 Football Championship in 2002. He also holds the record for the most appearances for the Czech Republic under-21 team with 45 caps.

In 2005, he was transferred from the Czech First League team FC Slovan Liberec for a fee of €1,500,000 to the Bundesliga side 1. FC Nürnberg. In the same year he played for the first time under Czech national coach Karel Brückner.

On 3 August 2007, Anderlecht bought Polák. He was given number 8. The Czech international reportedly cost €3.5 million and was at the time the second most expensive transfer in Anderlecht's history, as well as one of the highest paid players in Belgian football. He was Anderlecht's box-to-box midfielder playing a crucial role in their 2007–08 Jupiler League season and the 2007–08 UEFA Cup.

== Honours ==
1. FC Nürnberg

- DFB-Pokal: 2006–07

Anderlecht

- Belgian First Division: 2009–10
- Belgian Cup: 2007–08
- Belgian Super Cup: 2010
