= Ivica Banović =

Croatian footballer (born 1980)

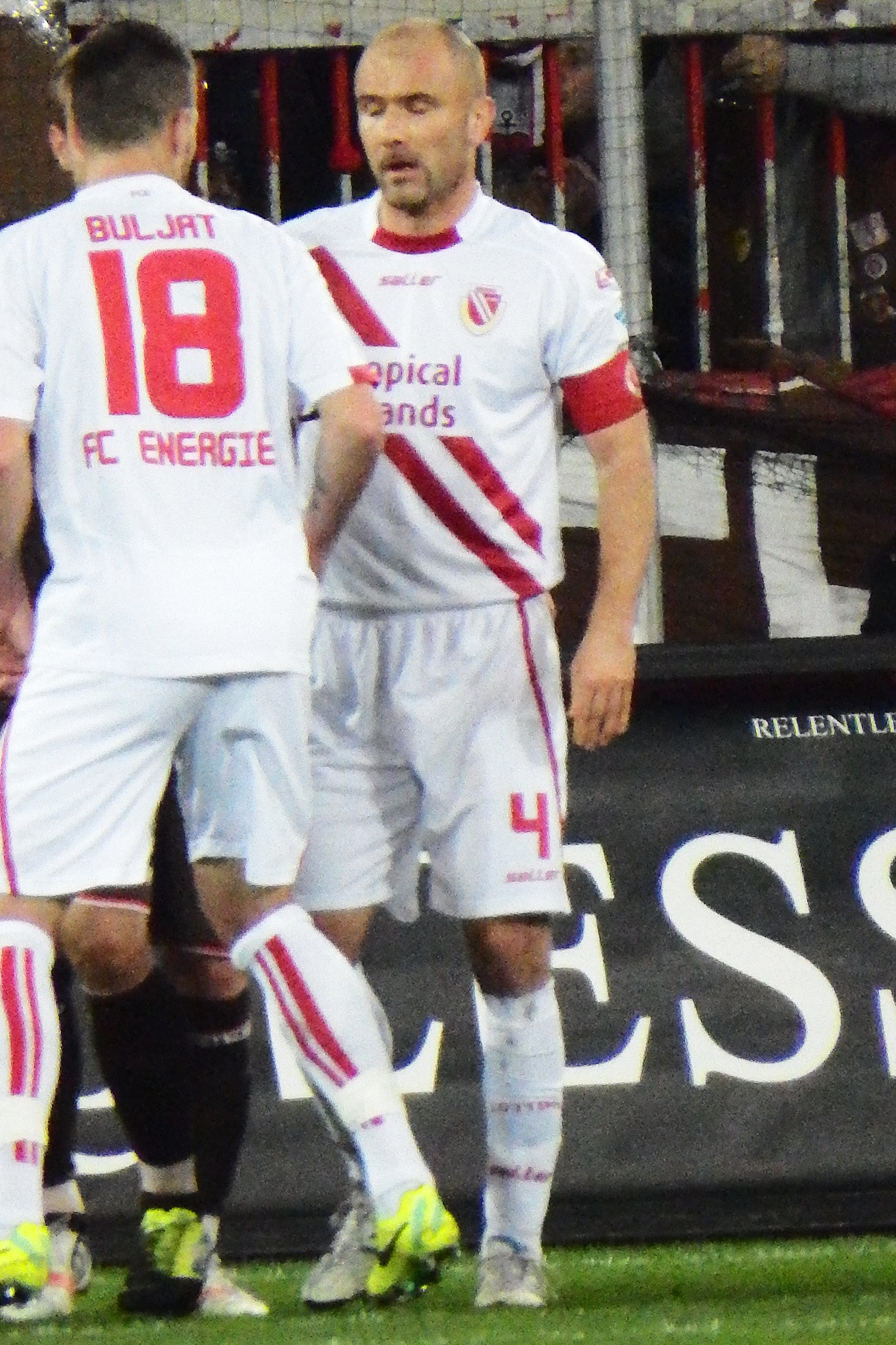
- Banović with Energie Cottbus in 2013

Personal information
- Date of birth: 2 August 1980 (age 46)
- Place of birth: Zagreb, SR Croatia, SFR Yugoslavia
- Height: 1.86 m (6 ft 1 in)
- Position: Defensive midfielder

Youth career
- 1986–1997: NK Zagreb

Senior career*
Years	Team	Apps	(Gls)
1997–2000	NK Zagreb	63	(9)
2000–2004	Werder Bremen	52	(2)
2004	Werder Bremen II	5	(5)
2004–2007	1. FC Nürnberg	69	(10)
2007–2011	SC Freiburg	82	(7)
2011	→ MSV Duisburg (loan)	16	(1)
2011–2014	Energie Cottbus	89	(10)
2014–2016	Hallescher FC	48	(5)
2016–2019	SC Freiburg II	66	(7)
Total		490	(56)

International career
1996–2001	Croatia Youth	25	(3)
2004	Croatia	2	(0)
- * Club domestic league appearances and goals

Ivica Banović (born 2 August 1980) is a Croatian former professional footballer who played as a defensive midfielder. An NK Zagreb youth product, he spent most of his career in Germany. At international level, he earned two caps with the Croatia national team.

== Club career ==
=== NK Zagreb ===
Born in Zagreb, Banović began to play football at NK Zagreb when he was 6 years old and subsequently spent his entire youth career with the club, eventually being added to their first team in the summer of 1997. He went on to play in the Croatian First League with the club during the following three seasons. After making 11 domestic league appearances in his first season as a professional, he went on to find his place as a regular with NK Zagreb. During the following two seasons, he made a total of 52 domestic league appearances and scored a total of nine domestic league goals for the club, eight of which came during the 1999–2000 season.

=== Werder Bremen ===
In the summer of 2000, Banović left NK Zagreb for a record outgoing transfer fee of DM 3.7 million (about €1.9 million) for German Bundesliga side Werder Bremen.

Banović made his Bundesliga debut in Werder Bremen's 3–3 draw at home to Bayer Leverkusen on 14 October 2000, coming on as a substitute for Dieter Eilts in the 58th minute. He went on to make a total of 17 Bundesliga appearances in his first season with Bremen, without scoring any goals.

He eventually scored his first Bundesliga goal in his third league appearance of the 2001–02 season, netting the opening goal in Bremen's 2–1 defeat at 1. FC Kaiserslautern on 9 September 2001. It was his only goal of the season, which he once again finished with a total of 17 Bundesliga appearances on his tally. He went on to make another 15 Bundesliga appearances during the following season in 2002–03, scoring his second Bundesliga goal for Bremen in their 2–0 win at home to VfL Bochum on 8 March 2003.

However, he lost his place in the first team during the 2003–04 season, only appearing in three Bundesliga matches that season. He did, however, score one more goal for the club's first team, netting their seventh goal in a 9–1 win at Ludwigsfelder FC in the first round of the German Cup. Although the club won the league that season, his contribution to the achievement was minimal, as all of his three Bundesliga appearances of the season came in the first five matches. His final appearance for Bremen's first team came in the German Cup in December 2003.

Eventually finding himself relegated to the club's reserve squad, Banović appeared in five Regionalliga Nord matches during the spring of 2004. He scored five goals during his five appearances for the reserves, a hat-trick in a 3–3 draw against SC Paderborn 07 and a brace in a 4–2 win against SG Wattenscheid 09.

=== 1. FC Nürnberg ===
In the summer of 2004, Banović left Bremen for Bundesliga rivals 1. FC Nürnberg. He scored two goals in his first two Bundesliga matches for Nuremberg, converting a penalty to score the opening goal in their 3–1 win at 1. FC Kaiserslautern and netting the equaliser in a 1–1 draw at home to VfB Stuttgart. He scored another goal in Nürnberg's 2–2 draw at home to Bayern Munich in December 2004, converting a penalty to set the final score. He made a total of 22 Bundesliga appearances for Nürnberg in his first season with the club.

He went on to make another 23 league appearances during the following season in 2005–2006, scoring two more goals. His first goal of the season came in a 3–2 defeat at home to Arminia Bielefeld in October 2005 and his second from a long-range free kick in a 3–1 win at Kaiserslautern the following month. During the same season, he also scored two goals in the first two of the club's three matches in the German Cup, before they were knocked out in the round of 16.

He made a good start to the 2006–07 Bundesliga season with Nürnberg, assisting in all three goals for a 3–0 win at VfB Stuttgart in the club's opening match of the season. He started all of the club's opening three matches of the Bundesliga season, but later lost his place in the starting line-up. He did, however, continue to play regularly as a substitute until the end of the season. His final season with Nürnberg was statistically nevertheless his most successful in the Bundesliga, with a tally of five goals in 25 appearances.

He also helped Nürnberg win the 2006–07 German Cup, making four appearances and scoring the only goal of their away match at BV Cloppenburg in the first round. His final appearance for Nürnberg came on 26 May 2007 in the German Cup final against VfB Stuttgart, in which he came off the bench for the final six minutes of extra time.

=== SC Freiburg ===
The day after the end of the 2006–07 Bundesliga season, it was confirmed that Banović will move to 2. Bundesliga side SC Freiburg on a free transfer following the expiration of his contract with Nuremberg at the end of June 2007. He signed a two-year contract with the club.

Banović quickly established himself as a regular at Freiburg, making his competitive debut against FC Villingen in the first round of the German Cup. He made his league debut against VfL Osnabrück in the club's first league match of the season and subsequently only missed one league match during the entire season due to a yellow-card suspension. In only his second appearance in the 2. Bundesliga, he scored his first and only league goal of the season in Freiburg's 1–0 win over SC Paderborn 07.

The following season in 2008–09, he made a total of 22 appearances in the 2nd Bundesliga and helped the club finish top of the league, securing promotion to the Bundesliga after four years of playing in the second division. He also scored two league goals for the club during the season, both in April 2009. The first of the two goals came in Freiburg's 2–1 win at 1. FSV Mainz 05 on 13 April 2009 and the second in their 3–2 win at home to FC Ingolstadt 04 a week later. At the end of the season, he extended his contract with Freiburg for another year.

Banović started the 2009–10 Bundesliga season as a regular with Freiburg and scored his first goals of the season on 20 September 2009, netting a brace in Freiburg's 4–0 win at Hertha BSC. Two weeks later, he also scored one goal in Freiburg's 5–2 defeat at Hannover 96.

=== MSV Duisburg ===
By January 2011, Banović had lost his place in Freiburg's starting formation and was loaned to MSV Duisburg for the rest of the 2010–11 season. He appeared in all but one of the club's matches and scored once. At the end of the season, he returned to Freiburg.

=== Energie Cottbus ===
After preparing for the 2011–12 season with SC Freiburg, but before the season began he transferred back to the 2nd division, joining Energie Cottbus.

=== Hallescher FC ===
Banović left Cottbus at the end of the 2013–14 after the club were relegated from the 2. Bundesliga. He signed for Hallescher FC

== International career ==
Between 1996 and 2001, Banović won a total of 25 international caps for the Croatian national under-17, under-19 and under-21 teams, scoring a total of three international goals. His first appearance in the finals of an international youth tournament came at the 1998 European Under-18 Championship in Cyprus, where the team reached the third place after beating Portugal in penalty shootout.

In the spring of 1999, Banović was part of the Croatian squad at the 1999 FIFA World Youth Championship in Nigeria, where he appeared as a second-half substitute in all of the team's four matches before they were eliminated by Brazil in the round of 16, also scoring one goal in Croatia's 5–1 victory over Kazakhstan in their second group match. He also played for the Croatian national under-21 team at the final tournament of the UEFA U-21 Championship 2000 in Slovakia.

Banović won his first senior international cap for Croatia as a substitute in their friendly match against Israel on 18 August 2004 in Varaždin, which they won 1–0. In October of the same year, he made his only appearance in the 2006 FIFA World Cup qualifying, playing as a substitute in the final 14 minutes of Croatia's third qualifying match, in which they were held to a 2–2 draw by Bulgaria in Zagreb. After that, he was no longer part of the national team.

== Honours ==
1. FC Nürnberg

- DFB-Pokal: 2006–07
