= Marco Engelhardt =

German footballer

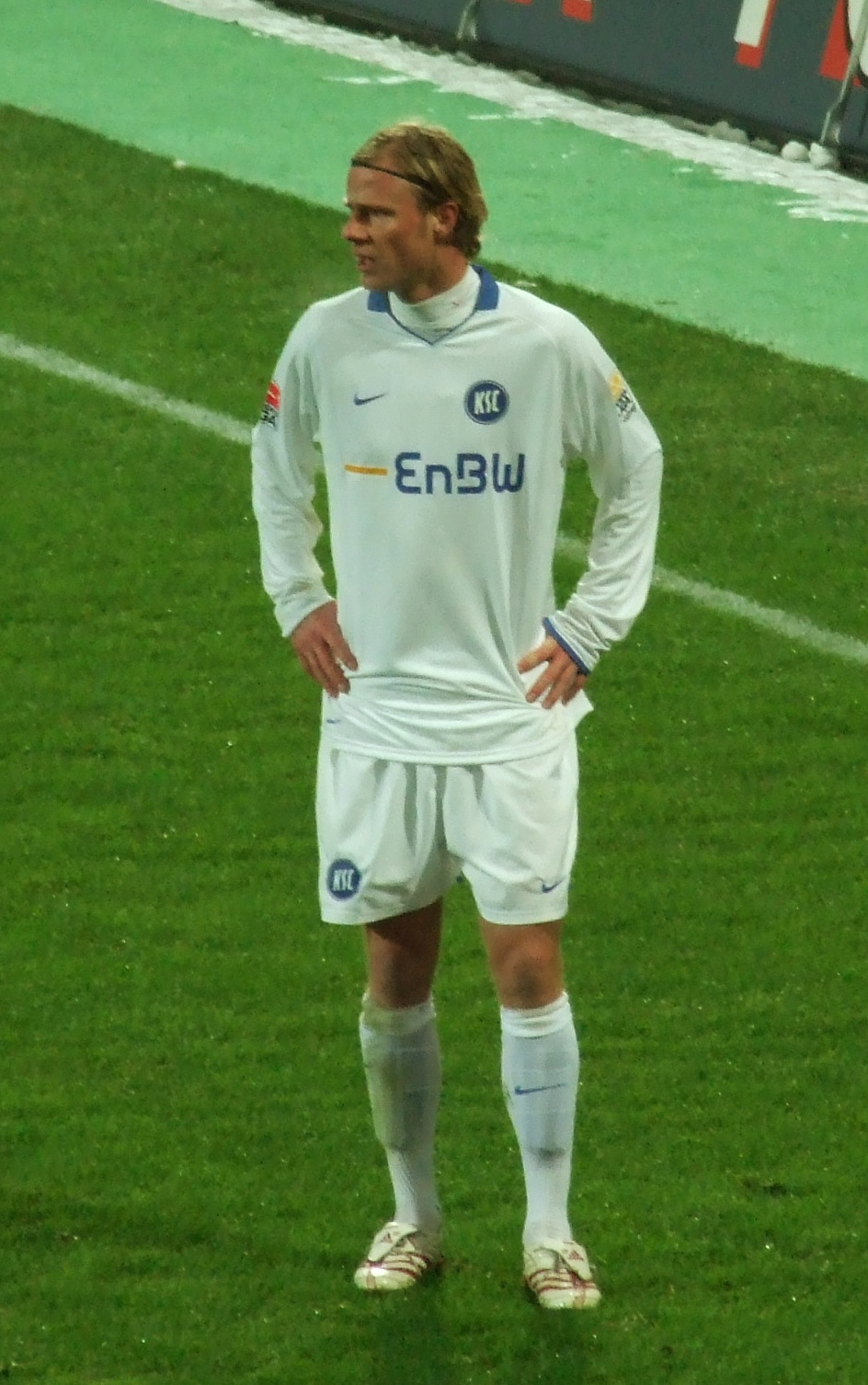
- Engelhardt in 2010

Personal information
- Full name: Marco Engelhardt
- Date of birth: 2 December 1980 (age 45)
- Place of birth: Bad Langensalza, East Germany
- Height: 1.86 m (6 ft 1 in)
- Position: Defensive midfielder

Youth career
- 1986–1990: Landbau Bad Langensalza
- 1990–1994: Preußen Bad Langensalza
- 1994–1999: Rot-Weiß Erfurt

Senior career*
Years	Team	Apps	(Gls)
1999–2001	Rot-Weiß Erfurt	62	(6)
2001–2004	Karlsruher SC	83	(5)
2004–2006	1. FC Kaiserslautern	62	(3)
2006–2009	1. FC Nürnberg	45	(6)
2009–2011	Karlsruher SC	47	(0)
2012–2014	Rot-Weiß Erfurt	89	(8)
2014–2016	Hallescher FC	62	(5)
2016–2018	1899 Hoffenheim II	48	(6)
Total		498	(39)

International career
1999–2000	Germany U-21	4	(2)
2003–2004	Germany B	6	(2)
2004–2005	Germany	3	(0)
- * Club domestic league appearances and goals

Marco Engelhardt (born 2 December 1980) is a German former professional footballer who played as a defensive midfielder.

== Club career ==
Engelhardt previously played for Karlsruher SC, 1. FC Nürnberg and 1. FC Kaiserslautern in the German top-flight. For KSC and Nürnberg he appeared also in the Second division.

== International career ==
Engelhardt has earned three caps for the Germany national football team.

== Post-playing career ==
After retiring as a player, Engelhardt became a scout for Werder Bremen.

== Honours ==
1. FC Nürnberg

- DFB-Pokal: 2006–07
