= Markus Schroth =

German former professional footballer (born 1975)

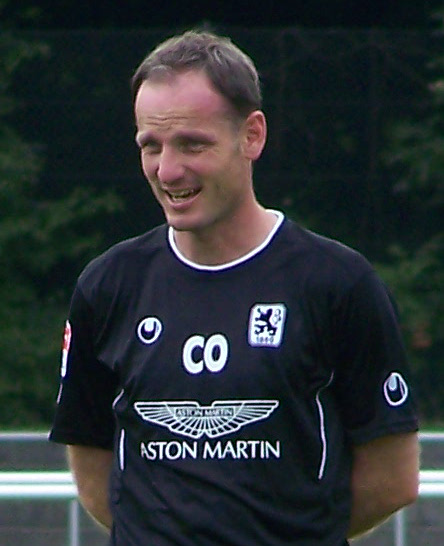
- Schroth with 1860 Munich in 2012

Personal information
- Date of birth: 25 January 1975 (age 51)
- Place of birth: Karlsruhe, West Germany
- Height: 1.93 m (6 ft 4 in)
- Position: Centre-forward

Youth career
- TSV Reichenbach
- 1990–1992: Karlsruher SC

Senior career*
Years	Team	Apps	(Gls)
1992–1996	Karlsruher SC II	71	(25)
1994–1998	Karlsruher SC	67	(11)
1998–2004	1860 Munich	150	(34)
2004–2007	1. FC Nürnberg	83	(17)
2007–2009	1860 Munich	0	(0)
Total		371	(87)

International career
1996–1998	Germany U-21	20	(6)
1998–2003	Germany B	8	(2)
- * Club domestic league appearances and goals

Markus Schroth (born 25 January 1975) is a German former professional footballer who played as a centre-forward.

== Club career ==
Schroth started to play football at the TSV Reichenbach, nearby Waldbronn, whence moving to Karlsruher SC at the age of 15. He started his professional career in 1994–95, and made his first division debut as a second-half substitute in the club's 0–1 loss at Eintracht Frankfurt, on 7 October 1994. It was his sole appearance of the campaign, and he amassed only four more in the following season, although he netted in another away fixture, a 3–0 success against SC Freiburg, on 13 April 1996. In the 1996 UEFA Intertoto cup, he scored the winning goal against Standard Liege in the final to make KSC 1 of 3 winners, along with Silkeborg and Guingamp.

Schroth eventually became a regular for KSC, making his UEFA Cup debut in a 0–1 loss at FC Rapid Bucharest (one minute played), and appearing in all the matches during 1997–98, scoring six goals, as Karlsruhe was eventually relegated.

He then joined TSV 1860 Munich in the summer of 1998, becoming an important offensive element from the start. In 2002–03, Schroth scored a career-best 14 goals, notably a hat-trick at FC Hansa Rostock, on 25 January 2003, and two goals in each venue against Energie Cottbus. However, 1860 Munich was relegated in the following season.

In the summer of 2004, Schroth signed a three-year contract with 1. FC Nürnberg. In his first two seasons with the club, he made 52 Bundesliga appearances in which he managed to score eleven goals. He made a good start in 2006–07, scoring two goals in the opening two matches, while also helping the side to that season's cup. On 2 February 2007, he scored, assisted and was booked in Nürnberg's 3–0 home win against Bayern Munich, the first game with Ottmar Hitzfeld back in charge.

It was announced in April 2007 that Schroth returned to TSV, after agreeing on a two-year contract, however he did not play one single match during his two-year spell and retired at the end of the 2008–09 season.

== International career ==
Between 1996 and 1998, Schroth was a member of the Germany under-21s, winning 20 international caps and scoring five goals. He also appeared six times for the nation's B side, scoring once.

In 2003, Schroth played two matches (one goal) for "Team 2006", a squad made of players being watched for a possible selection for the 2006 FIFA World Cup, but would not finally make the cut.

== Career statistics ==
=== Club ===
Appearances and goals by club, season and competition
Club	Season	League			DFB-Pokal		DFB-Ligapokal		Europe		Total	
Club	Season	Division	Apps	Goals	Apps	Goals	Apps	Goals	Apps	Goals	Apps	Goals
Karlsruher SC	1994–95	Bundesliga	1	0	1	0	–		0	0	2	0
Karlsruher SC	1995–96	Bundesliga	4	1	0	0	–		0	0	4	1
Karlsruher SC	1996–97	Bundesliga	28	4	3	1	–		1+1	1	33	6
Karlsruher SC	1997–98	Bundesliga	34	6	2	1	2	0	6	1	43	8
Karlsruher SC	Total		67	11	6	2	2	0	8	2	83	15
1860 Munich	1998–99	Bundesliga	33	6	2	1	–		–		35	7
1860 Munich	1999–00	Bundesliga	22	3	2	1	0	0	0	0	24	4
1860 Munich	2000–01	Bundesliga	13	2	0	0	0	0	0	0	13	2
1860 Munich	2001–02	Bundesliga	21	3	3	1	–		5	1	29	5
1860 Munich	2002–03	Bundesliga	32	14	3	0	–		2	0	37	14
1860 Munich	2003–04	Bundesliga	29	6	2	0	–		0	0	31	6
1860 Munich	Total		150	34	12	3	0	0	7	1	169	38
1. FC Nürnberg	2004–05	Bundesliga	23	7	1	0	–		–		24	7
1. FC Nürnberg	2005–06	Bundesliga	29	4	3	0	0	0	0	0	32	4
1. FC Nürnberg	2006–07	Bundesliga	31	6	4	0	0	0	0	0	35	6
1. FC Nürnberg	Total		83	17	8	0	0	0	0	0	91	17
Career total			300	62	26	5	2	0	15	3	343	70

== Honours ==
=== Club ===
1. FC Nürnberg

- DFB-Pokal: 2006–07
