= Dominik Reinhardt =

German footballer (born 1984)

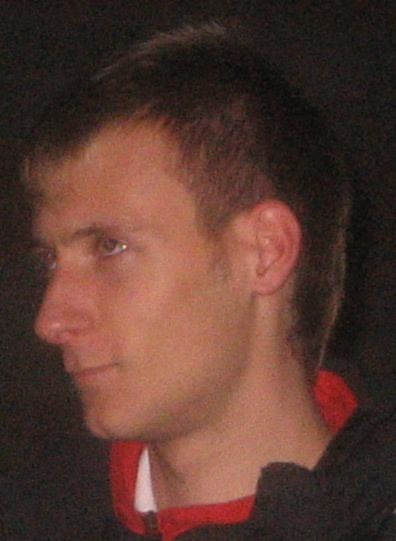
- Reinhardt in 2007

Personal information
- Date of birth: 19 December 1984 (age 41)
- Place of birth: Leverkusen, West Germany
- Height: 1.88 m (6 ft 2 in)
- Position: Right back

Youth career
- 1990–1991: Bayer Leverkusen
- 1991–1994: Bayern Munich
- 1994–1999: TSV Höchstadt
- 1999–2002: 1. FC Nürnberg

Senior career*
Years	Team	Apps	(Gls)
2002–2010	1. FC Nürnberg	121	(1)
2003–2010	1. FC Nürnberg II	37	(5)
2009–2010	→ FC Augsburg (loan)	30	(0)
2010–2015	FC Augsburg	22	(0)
2012–2015	FC Augsburg II	12	(1)
Total		222	(7)

International career
2003–2004	Germany U20	2	(0)
2006	Germany U21	5	(0)

Managerial career
- 2017–2018: FC Augsburg II
- * Club domestic league appearances and goals

Dominik Reinhardt (born 19 December 1984) is a German football manager and former player.

== Career ==
At Bayer Leverkusen, where his father played at that time, he started playing football. In his youth career he also played for FC Bayern Munich, TSV Hoechstadt and 1. FC Nürnberg. In Nuremberg he signed his first senior contract in 2002.

Since season 2005–06 he has been a starting line-up player. He scored one goal for 1. FC Nürnberg on 22 October 2005 in the match against Arminia Bielefeld.

In 2007, he won the German DFB-Pokal. In the following season he played his first UEFA-Cup match on 20 September 2007 against FC Rapid București (0–0). On 21 July 2009, Reinhardt was loaned out from 1. FC Nürnberg to the second division club FC Augsburg for one year. After that season he transferred to FC Augsburg.

== Personal life ==
Reinhardt is the son of the former player in the Germany national football team, Alois Reinhardt.

== Honours ==
1. FC Nürnberg

- DFB-Pokal: 2006–07
