= Michael Weiner (referee) =

German football referee

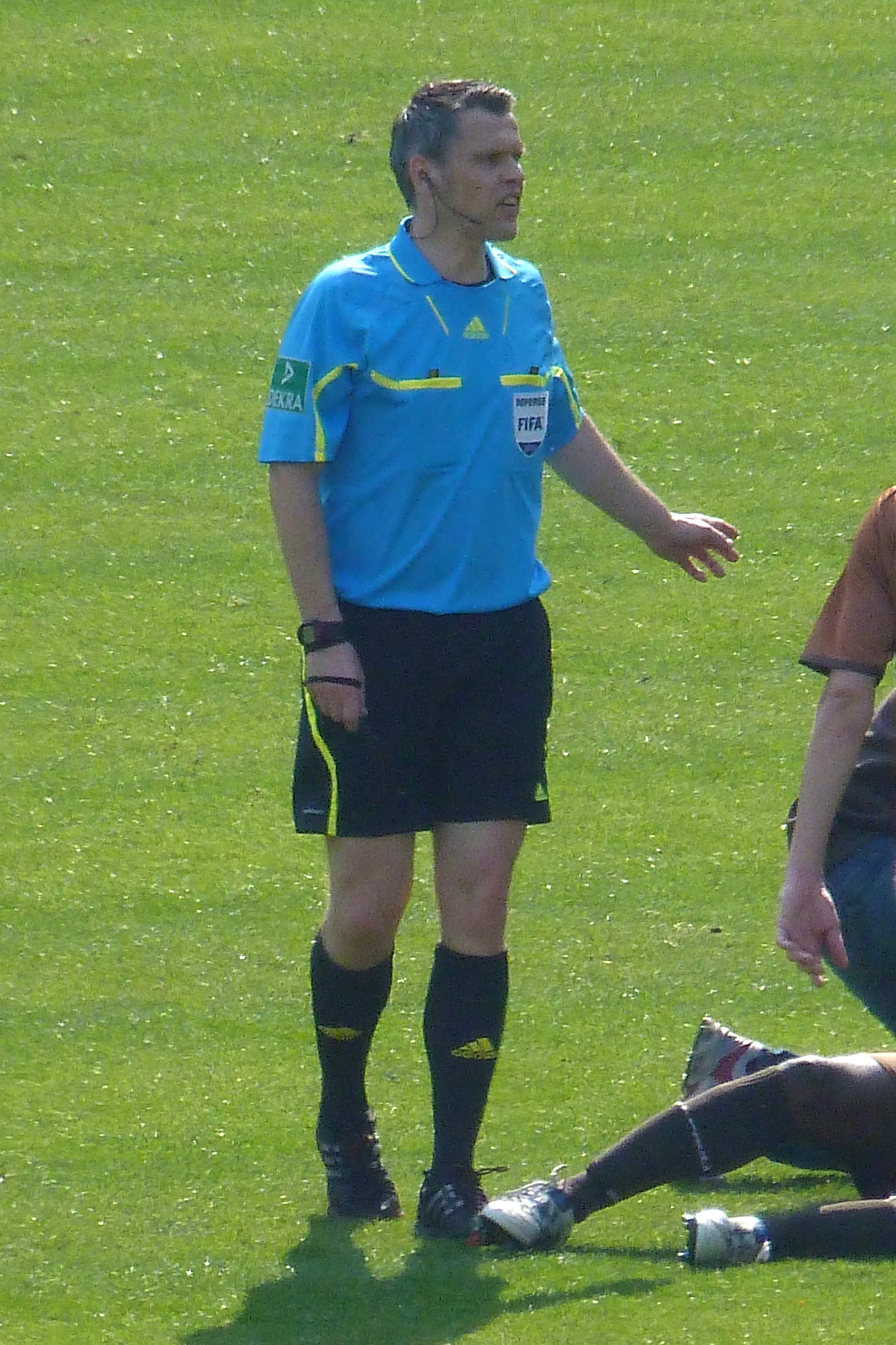
- Weiner in 2011
- Born: 21 March 1969 (age 57); Ottenstein, West Germany
- Other occupation: Chief superintendent

Domestic
Years	League	Role
1993–2016	DFB	Referee
1995–2016	2. Bundesliga	Referee
2000–2016	Bundesliga	Referee

International
Years	League	Role
2002–2012	FIFA listed	Referee

Michael Weiner (born 21 March 1969) is a German former football referee. He refereed for TSV Ottenstein of the Lower Saxony Football Association.

== Refereeing career ==
Weiner was entitled to take charge of matches in DFB-administered leagues in 1993. Two years later, he was promoted to the 2. Bundesliga before eventually working his first Bundesliga match in 1998.

In 2002, Weiner was admitted to the FIFA list of referees. He was one of the referees at the 2003 UEFA European Under-19 Football Championship. He has been in charge of 16 international matches until this date.

Weiner was the referee of the 2006–07 DFB-Pokal Final between VfB Stuttgart and 1. FC Nürnberg.

Weiner retired from officiating in 2016 because he reached the age limit for German referees, which is 47. His final Bundesliga match officiated was between Borussia Dortmund and 1. FC Köln.

== Personal life ==
Unit 2014 Weiner was chief superintendent and director of the police station in Holzminden. Meanwhile, Weiner operates a department in the Göttingen police department. He lives with his family in Giesen.
