= Babak Rafati =

Iranian-German football referee (born 1970)

- Born: 28 May 1970 (age 56); Hanover, West Germany
- Height: 1.80 m (5 ft 11 in)
- Other occupation: Banker

Domestic
Years	League	Role
2000–2011	2. Bundesliga	Referee
2005–2011	Bundesliga	Referee

International
Years	League	Role
2008–2011	FIFA listed	Referee

Babak Rafati (Persian: بابک رفعتی; born 28 May 1970) is an Iranian-German former football referee.

As of February 2010, he has officiated more than 150 matches in the Bundesliga and the 2. Bundesliga. As of November 2011, he has officiated 84 top-flight German league games.

== Suicide attempt ==
Rafati was scheduled to referee a Bundesliga match on 19 November 2011 between 1. FC Köln and 1. FSV Mainz 05, but never arrived, leading to the match's abandonment after a replacement could not be found. He was later found in his hotel room, having attempted suicide, and was rushed into intensive care. He confirmed that he was suffering from depression, and that would like to return to refereeing after he finished undergoing therapy. Incidentally, his debut officiating a Bundesliga game was a match between Köln and Mainz 05 on 6 August 2005.
