= 2006–07 DFB-Pokal =

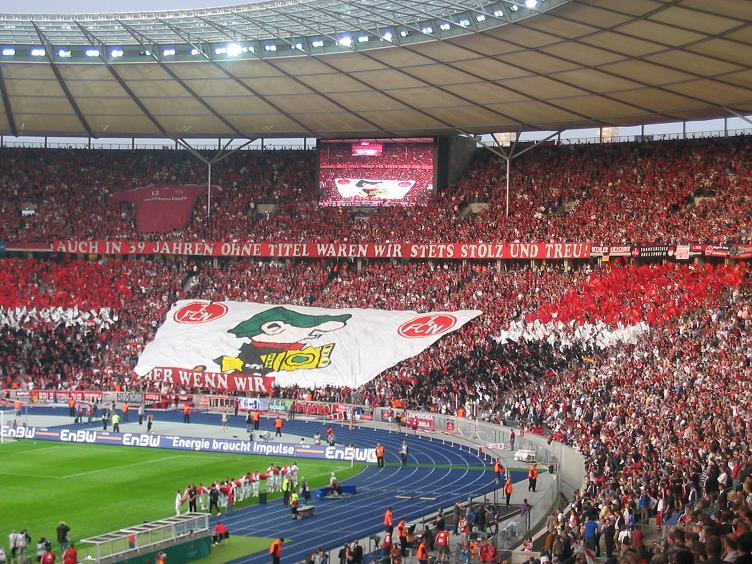
- Fans of cup winners 1. FC Nürnberg at the final.

Tournament details
- Country: Germany
- Teams: 64

Final positions
- Champions: 1. FC Nürnberg
- Runners-up: VfB Stuttgart

Tournament statistics
- Matches played: 63

The 2006–07 DFB-Pokal was the 64th season of the annual German football cup competition. 64 teams competed in the tournament of six rounds, which began on 8 September 2006 and ended on 26 May 2007. In the final, 1. FC Nürnberg defeated VfB Stuttgart 3–2 after extra time, thereby claiming their fourth title.

== Matches ==
Times up to 28 October 2006 and from 25 March 2007 are CEST (UTC+2). Times from 29 October 2006 to 24 March 2007 are CET (UTC+1).

=== First round ===
8 September 2006
SV Sandhausen	0–2	SpVgg Greuther Fürth
VfL Osnabrück	3–1	Eintracht Braunschweig
9 September 2006
SpVgg Bayreuth	0–2	Kickers Offenbach
Tennis Borussia Berlin	1–3	Karlsruher SC
1. FC Magdeburg	1–1	Paderborn 07	(AET) (Paderborn 07 won 7–6 on penalties)
Westfalia Herne	1–2	Erzgebirge Aue
Dynamo Dresden	2–3	Hannover 96
Delbrücker SC	2–4	SC Freiburg
Hansa Rostock II	1–9	Schalke 04
TSG Thannhausen	0–3	Borussia Dortmund
FK Pirmasens	1–1	Werder Bremen	(AET) (Pirmasens won 4–2 on penalties)
BV Cloppenburg	0–1	1. FC Nürnberg
Gera 03	0–2	1. FC Kaiserslautern
Rot-Weiss Essen	1–0	Energie Cottbus
Stuttgarter Kickers	4–3	Hamburger SV	(AET)
TuS Koblenz	2–2	Bayer Leverkusen	(AET) (Bayer Leverkusen won 3–1 on penalties)
FC Augsburg	3–4	Wacker Burghausen	(AET)
Alemannia Aachen II	0–4	VfB Stuttgart
Sportfreunde Siegen	0–2	Eintracht Frankfurt
FC Homburg	1–2	VfL Bochum
FC St. Pauli	1–2	Bayern Munich	(AET)
10 September 2006
SSVg Velbert	0–3	SpVgg Unterhaching
SV Rossbach	1–4	Borussia Mönchengladbach
Rot-Weiß Ahlen	1–2	MSV Duisburg
Babelsberg 03	2–1	Hansa Rostock
Carl Zeiss Jena	1–2	1. FC Köln
VfB Lübeck	1–0	1860 Munich
FC Bremerhaven	1–3	VfL Wolfsburg
1. FC Saarbrücken	1–0	FSV Mainz 05
Chemnitzer FC	0–2	Alemannia Aachen
Darmstadt 98	0–1	Hertha BSC	(AET)
SC Pfullendorf	2–1	Arminia Bielefeld

=== Second round ===
24 October 2006
Babelsberg 03	2–4	VfB Stuttgart
1. FC Saarbrücken	0–2	SpVgg Greuther Fürth
FK Pirmasens	0–3	SpVgg Unterhaching
VfB Lübeck	0–0	Wacker Burghausen	(AET) (Wacker Burghausen won 5–4 on penalties)
VfL Bochum	3–2	Karlsruher SC
VfL Wolfsburg	1–0	SC Freiburg
Borussia Dortmund	0–1	Hannover 96
1. FC Köln	4–2	Schalke 04	(AET)
25 October 2006
Alemannia Aachen	4–2	Erzgebirge Aue	(AET)
SC Pfullendorf	0–2	Kickers Offenbach
VfL Osnabrück	2–1	Borussia Mönchengladbach
Paderborn 07	1–2	1. FC Nürnberg	(AET)
Rot-Weiss Essen	1–2	Eintracht Frankfurt
MSV Duisburg	3–2	Bayer Leverkusen	(AET)
Stuttgarter Kickers	0–2^{*}	Hertha BSC
Bayern Munich	1–0	1. FC Kaiserslautern

^{*}Match abandoned on 86' after linesman was struck from the crowd; Result stood

=== Round of 16 ===
19 December 2006
VfL Osnabrück	0–3	Hertha BSC
VfL Bochum	1–4	VfB Stuttgart
Eintracht Frankfurt	3–1	1. FC Köln	(AET)
1. FC Nürnberg	0–0	SpVgg Unterhaching	(AET) (Nürnberg won 2–1 on penalties)
20 December 2006
Kickers Offenbach	2–1	Wacker Burghausen
SpVgg Greuther Fürth	1–3	VfL Wolfsburg
Hannover 96	1–0	MSV Duisburg
Alemannia Aachen	4–2	Bayern Munich

=== Quarter-finals ===
27 February 2007
1. FC Nürnberg	0–0	Hannover 96	(AET) (Nürnberg won 4–2 on penalties)
VfL Wolfsburg	2–0	Alemannia Aachen
Kickers Offenbach	0–3	Eintracht Frankfurt
28 February 2007
VfB Stuttgart	2–0	Hertha BSC

=== Semi-finals ===
17 April 2007
1. FC Nürnberg	4–0	Eintracht Frankfurt
18 April 2007
VfL Wolfsburg	0–1	VfB Stuttgart

=== Final ===
26 May 2007
20:00 CEST

VfB Stuttgart	2–3 (a.e.t.)	1. FC Nürnberg
Cacau 20'; Pardo 80' (pen.)	Report	Mintál 27'; Engelhardt 47'; Kristiansen 109'

Olympiastadion, Berlin
Attendance: 74,220
Referee: Michael Weiner (Giesen)
