= Rosenaue =

River in Germany

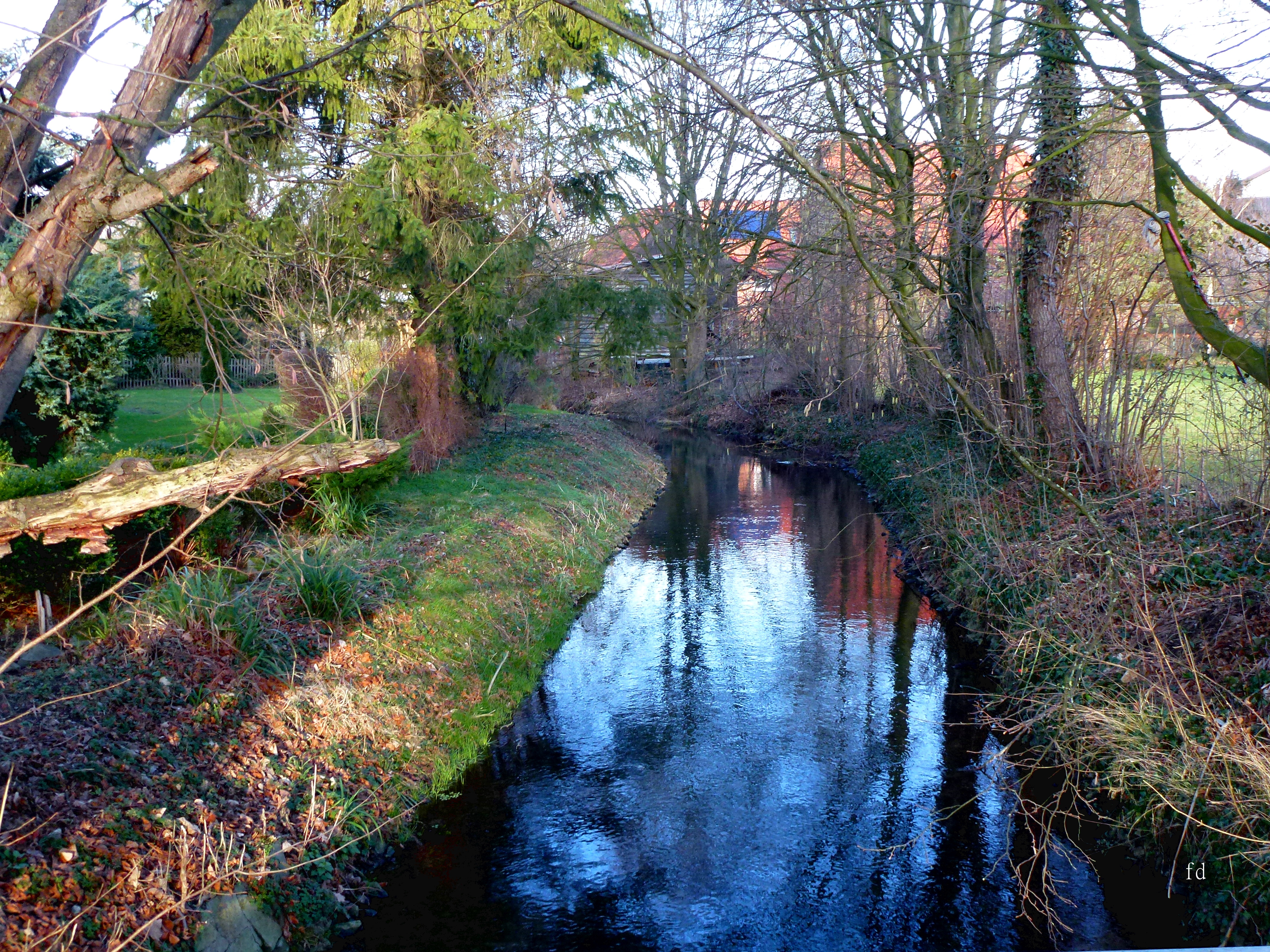

Location
- Country: Germany
- State: North Rhine-Westphalia

Physical characteristics
- Mouth
  - location: Ahse
  - coordinates: 51.6325°N 8.1015°E
- Length: 15.5 km (9.6 mi)

Basin features
- Progression: Ahse→ Lippe→ Rhine→ North Sea

Rosenaue is a river of North Rhine-Westphalia, Germany. It flows into the Ahse near Oestinghausen.

== See also ==
- List of rivers of North Rhine-Westphalia
