= Schledde (Ahse) =

River in Germany

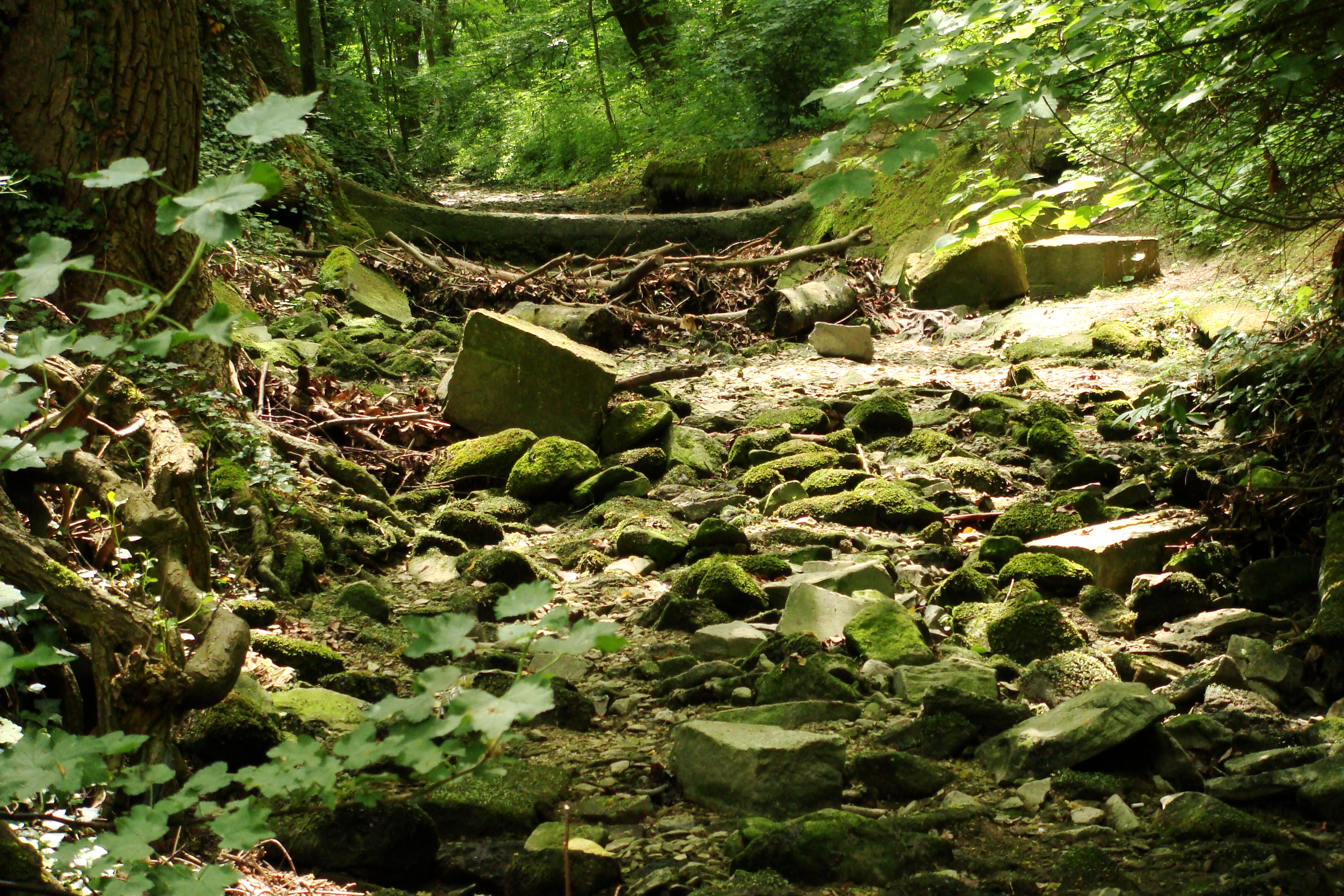

Location
- Country: Germany
- State: North Rhine-Westphalia

Physical characteristics
- Mouth
  - location: Ahse
  - coordinates: 51.6319°N 8.1006°E
- Length: 16.6 km (10.3 mi)

Basin features
- Progression: Ahse→ Lippe→ Rhine→ North Sea

Schledde is a river of North Rhine-Westphalia, Germany. It is a left tributary of the Ahse near Oestinghausen.

== See also ==
- List of rivers of North Rhine-Westphalia
