= Senoussi (cigarette) =

German cigarette brand

- Product type: Cigarette
- Current owner: Imperial Tobacco
- Produced by: Reemtsma
- Country: Germany
- Introduced: 1921
- Discontinued: 2002; 24 years ago
- Markets: Germany

Senoussi was a German brand of cigarettes that was owned and manufactured by Reemtsma, a division of Imperial Tobacco. The brand was discontinued in 2002.

== History ==
A classical Senoussi pack

Senoussi was created in 1921 and was launched in 1926 by Reemtsma, which manufactured and commercialized the brand until 2002. Germany was the main sales market. For a short period in the 1950s, the company only produced a filter-less variant. The name and the packaging design (depicting a group of Arabs in a Burnous) put the type of oriental cigarette in the focus. When EU regulations came into force in 2002, further limiting the levels of tar, nicotine and carbon monoxide, the brand disappeared off the shelves in Europe, along with many other oriental cigarette brands. Senoussi cigarettes contained 1.3 milligrams of nicotine and 22 milligrams of tar, years before the strength was reduced to 1.0 mg of nicotine and 12 mg of tar in the 1990s, a value held up to 2002 when the new EU regulations came into force. The cigarettes were known for their length, in comparasion most other filter-less cigarettes were seen as much shorter.

== Packaging ==
The packs and tin boxes show a colorful and decorative illustrations of a Bedouin tribe and contain various Egyptian symbols. Hans Domizlaff was the original creator of the Senoussi design that was visible on the packs and tin boxes.

== See also ==
- Tobacco smoking
