= R6 =

R6 or R-6 may refer to:

- Line R6, a commuter rail service on the Llobregat–Anoia Line, in Barcelona, Catalonia, Spain
- Radial Road 6 or R-6, an arterial road of Manila, Philippines
- R6 assault rifle, a South African shortened version of the R4 assault rifle
- Renault 6
- R6 battery, a carbon-zinc battery in the AA size. See List of battery sizes
- R6 implant, a type of implant in Scientology doctrine
- R6 (New York City Subway car), a model of New York City Subway rolling stock manufactured from 1935 to 1936
- R6 (SEPTA), a former commuter rail line in Philadelphia, Pennsylvania, which has been split into:
  - Cynwyd Line (R6 Cynwyd)
  - Manayunk/Norristown Line (R6 Norristown)
- A body type in the videogame website Roblox
- R6 (RER Vaud), an S-Bahn line in the canton of Vaud
- R6: Explosive with or without contact with air, a risk phrase in chemistry
- Caudron R.6, a French reconnaissance aircraft of World War I
- R6 expressway (Czech Republic), a road in Czech Republic
- R6 expressway (Slovakia)
- Regjeringskvartalet or R6, a building under construction as part of the Norwegian Government quarter (Norw. Regjeringskvartalet)
- Ross R-6 glider
- Tupolev R-6, a Soviet multi- role reconnaissance fighter
- USS R-6 (SS-83), a 1919 R-class coastal and harbor defense submarine of the United States Navy
- Yamaha YZF-R6, a 600cc Yamaha supersport-class motorcycle
- Rainbow Six (disambiguation), a Tom Clancy video game series and book, is sometimes abbreviated as R6
- RACSA (airline) IATA code
- Sikorsky R-6 helicopter
- R6 (cigarette), a German brand
- R6, a multi-tenant Business Support System (BSS) of Infonova
- Canon EOS R6, a Canon full-frame mirrorless interchangeable-lens camera]
- Region 6, the DVD region code for People's Republic of China, Hong Kong, North Korea
- receptor 6, the sixth in line of a series of cellular receptors, generally at the end of an acronym
- R6 road (Zimbabwe), A road connecting Chivhu with Nyazura

R06 may refer to:

- HMS Illustrious (R06), a 1976 Invincible-class British Royal Navy light aircraft carrier
- ATC code R06 Antihistamines for systemic use, a subgroup of the Anatomical Therapeutic Chemical Classification System

== See also ==
- 6R (disambiguation)
