= Ernte 23 =

German cigarette brand

- An old German pack of Ernte 23 cigarettes
- Product type: Cigarette
- Produced by: Reemtsma, a division of Imperial Tobacco
- Country: Germany
- Introduced: 1923; 103 years ago

Ernte 23 is a German brand of cigarettes, currently owned and manufactured by Reemtsma, a subsidiary of Imperial Tobacco. "Ernte" is German for "harvest".

== History ==
Ernte 23 was launched in 1923 by Reemtsma. In that same year, the harvest of oriental tobacco grown in southern Bulgaria, now in northern Greece was so great that the Reemtsma experts recommended it as the basis of the mix, and on the package were specified areas of production and origin. All of this made Ernte 23 of the most popular brand of cigarettes in the 1920s. The tobacco was based in 1924 for the new brand Ernte 23, created by Hans Domizlaff, which has been protected since 1931.

Unusual for the time was the color scheme of the Ernte 23 pack. The colors used were red and orange, the designer Erich Etzold designed a package that stood out remarkably from the color combinations of other brands at the time.

After the end of World War II, the taste selection of cigarette consumers changed with the arrival of American troops. Thus, the oriental cigarette was almost completely ousted, and Ernte 23 even became an American Blend cigarette. But it is dispensed with the use or flavoring. Meanwhile, it is also referred to as German Blend.

In 1963, Ernte 23 had a monthly sales volume of 1.25 billion units and the market share had grown to 55% since 1960.

In 1976, the Reemtsma managers developed an advertising campaign for the brand along with voting postcards for listed buildings, where buyers had the choice of where the cigarette company should spend an amount of 25,000 Deutsche Mark for the preservation of monuments. The brand Ernte 23 still had a market share of 8.6 percent in 1976.

In the 1920s, Reemtsma included various collector's cards inside Ernte 23 cigarettes. The first was a set of "Kleine Bilder" ("Small Pictures") issued in 1923 with the brand. This makes it one of the first series issued after World War I. The series was followed up in 1924 with a set of "Große Bilder" ("Large Pictures"). The company also issued two books depicting the 1924 Summer Olympics in Paris and the 1928 Summer Olympics in Amsterdam. Reemtsma also made various promotional posters to sell the Ernte 23 brand.

== Controversy ==
=== Reemtsma sued by a smoker ===
In November 2003, a 56-year-old smoker sued Reemtsma over damages from smoking. After 40 years of smoking Ernte 23 cigarettes, the smoker became terminally ill. The district court of Arnsberg further stated in its judgment that the tobacco company Reemtsma could not be held liable. "Everyone knows that smoking leads to serious health problems. Smokers are responsible for their behavior." said the board. "It is also not possible to prove that additives in the cigarettes could have increased the addiction. The addictive effect of cigarettes is also known. Nor can it be proven that the applicant's illness was caused by smoking." the court said. The 56-year-old Wolfgang Heine from Lippetal in Westphalia demanded 213.000 Euros in compensation and damages from Reemtsma Cigarettenfabriken in Hamburg.

=== Ernte 23 and the Illuminati ===
In January 2015, it was reported that Ernte 23 is linked with the Illuminati by conspiracy theorists. The number 23 counts as the number of Illuminati, hence why they associate it with the brand. They refer to The Illuminatus! Trilogy by Robert Anton Wilson and Robert Shea. In the brand name, some even see another connection to the Illuminati. "Ernte" has five letters, and five is the checksum of 23. However, there has never been any concrete proof that the Ernte 23 brand is associated with the Illuminati.

== Markets ==
Ernte 23 is mainly sold in Germany, but also was or still is sold in the Weimar Republic, Nazi Germany, West Germany, Finland, France, Austria, Switzerland, Italy, Hungary and Slovenia.

== See also ==
- Tobacco smoking
