= 2004–05 1. FC Nürnberg season =

1. FC Nürnberg
2004–05 season
- Chairman: Michael A. Roth
- Manager: Wolfgang Wolf
- Stadium: Frankenstadion
- Bundesliga: 14th
- DFB-Pokal: 2nd round
- Top goalscorer: League: Marek Mintál (24); All: Marek Mintál (25)
- Highest home attendance: 44,560 vs Bochum
- Lowest home attendance: 17,960 vs Bielefeld
- Average home league attendance: 29,549
Home colours	Away colours

The 2004–05 1. FC Nürnberg season was the 105th season in the club's football history.

== Match results ==
=== Legend ===
Win Draw Loss

=== Bundesliga ===
7 August 2004 1	1. FC Kaiserslautern	1–3	1. FC Nürnberg	Kaiserslautern
15:30 CEST (UTC+02)	Zandi 58' (pen.)	Match Report	12' (pen.) Banović; 61' Vittek; 84' L. Müller	Stadium: Fritz-Walter-Stadion; Attendance: 37,800; Referee: Michael Weiner; Man of the Match: Schroth

14 August 2004 2	1. FC Nürnberg	1–1	VfB Stuttgart	Nuremberg
15:30 CEST (UTC+02)	Banović 15'	Match Report	8' Cacau	Stadium: Frankenstadion; Attendance: 41,384 (sell-out); Referee: Uwe Kemmling; Man of the Match: Soldo

28 August 2004 3	Hamburger SV	4–3	1. FC Nürnberg	Hamburg
15:30 CEST (UTC+02)	van Buyten 12'; Schlicke 40'; Mpenza 51'; Lauth 86'	Match Report	38', 76', 83' Mintál	Stadium: Volksparkstadion; Attendance: 36,587; Referee: Markus Merk; Man of the Match: Mintál

11 September 2004 4	1. FC Nürnberg	0–0	Hertha BSC Berlin	Nuremberg
15:30 CEST (UTC+02)		Match Report		Stadium: Frankenstadion; Attendance: 30,891; Referee: Stefan Trautmann; Man of the Match: Madlung

18 September 2004 5	Bayer 04 Leverkusen	2–2	1. FC Nürnberg	Leverkusen
15:30 CEST	Butt 76' (pen.); Berbatov 80'	Match Report	23' S. Müller; 69' (o.g.) Placente	Stadium: BayArena; Attendance: 22,500 (sell-out); Referee: Knut Kircher; Man of the Match: Schäfer

25 September 2004 6	1. FC Nürnberg	1–2	Arminia Bielefeld	Nuremberg
15:30 CEST	Kießling 76'	Match Report	18' Vata; 64' Owomoyela	Stadium: Frankenstadion; Attendance: 17,960; Referee: Florian Meyer; Man of the Match: M. Langkamp

2 October 2004 7	Borussia Dortmund	2–2	1. FC Nürnberg	Dortmund
15:30 CEST (UTC+02)	Koller 29', 45+1'	Match Report	23' Mintál; 25' Vittek	Stadium: Westfalenstadion; Attendance: 75,000; Referee: Lutz-Michael Fröhlich; Man of the Match: Vittek

16 October 2004 8	1. FC Nürnberg	3–0	SC Freiburg	Nuremberg
15:30 CEST (UTC+02)	Mintál 26'; Vittek 49'; Schroth 56'	Match Report		Stadium: Frankenstadion; Attendance: 21,006; Referee: Jörg Keßler; Man of the Match: Schroth

23 October 2004 9	Werder Bremen	4–1	1. FC Nürnberg	Bremen
15:30 CEST (UTC+02)	Klasnić 13'; Micoud 18'; Schulz 75'; Ernst 88'	Match Report	64' (pen.) Mintál	Stadium: Weserstadion; Attendance: 38,800; Referee: Thorsten Kinhöfer; Man of the Match: Micoud

27 October 2004 10	1. FC Nürnberg	0–2	FC Schalke 04	Nuremberg
20:00 CEST (UTC+02)		Match Report	10' (pen.) Aílton; 45' Sand	Stadium: Frankenstadion; Attendance: 32,115; Referee: Lutz-Michael Fröhlich; Man of the Match: Poulsen

31 October 2004 11	FC Hansa Rostock	0–2	1. FC Nürnberg	Rostock
17:30 CEST (UTC+02)		Match Report	56', 59' Schroth	Stadium: Ostseestadion; Attendance: 20,300 (sell-out); Referee: Peter Gagelmann; Man of the Match: Schäfer

6 November 2004 12	1. FC Nürnberg	4–0	VfL Wolfsburg	Nuremberg
15:30 CET (UTC+01)	Mintál 1', 28', 49'; Schroth 45'	Match Report		Stadium: Frankenstadion; Attendance: 22,291; Referee: Manuel Gräfe; Man of the Match: Mintál

13 November 2004 13	Borussia Mönchengladbach	2–1	1. FC Nürnberg	Mönchengladbach
15:30 CET (UTC+01)	Neuville 19' (pen.); Sverkos 72'	Match Report	90+3' (pen.) Mintál	Stadium: Borussia-Park; Attendance: 45,595; Referee: Markus Merk; Man of the Match: Neuville

21 November 2004 14	1. FC Nürnberg	1–1	Hannover 96	Nuremberg
17:30 CET (UTC+01)	Mintál 81'	Match Report	56' Stendel	Stadium: Frankenstadion; Attendance: 22,318; Referee: Knut Kircher; Man of the Match: Stendel

27 November 2004 15	VfL Bochum	3–1	1. FC Nürnberg	Bochum
15:30 CET (UTC+01)	Lokvenc 21', 50'; Kalla 42'	Match Report	65' Mintál	Stadium: Ruhrstadion; Attendance: 20,356; Referee: Stefan Trautmann; Man of the Match: Lokvenc

4 December 2004 16	1. FC Nürnberg	2–2	FC Bayern Munich	Nuremberg
15:30 CET (UTC+01)	Mintál 23'; Banovic 74' (pen.)	Match Report	26' (pen.) Makaay (60.) Zé Roberto	Stadium: Frankenstadion; Attendance: 44,359 (sell-out); Referee: Florian Meyer; Man of the Match: Schäfer

11 December 2004 17	FSV Mainz 05	0–1	1. FC Nürnberg	Mainz
15:30 CET (UTC+01)		Match Report	10' Schroth	Stadium: Stadion am Bruchweg; Attendance: 20,300 (sell-out); Referee: Jürgen Jansen; Man of the Match: Schäfer

22 January 2005 18	1. FC Nürnberg	1–3	1. FC Kaiserslautern	Nuremberg
15:30 CET (UTC+01)	S. Müller 66'	Match Report	51' Lembi; 60' Blank; 84' Grammozis	Stadium: Frankenstadion; Attendance: 21,647; Referee: Herbert Fandel; Man of the Match: Engelhardt

29 January 2005 19	VfB Stuttgart	2–4	1. FC Nürnberg	Stuttgart
15:30 CET (UTC+01)	Fernando Meira 52'; Szabics 70'	Match Report	6' S. Müller; 11', 85' Schroth; 83' Mintál	Stadium: Gottlieb-Daimler-Stadion; Attendance: 46,000; Referee: Peter Gagelmann; Man of the Match: Schroth

5 February 2005 20	1. FC Nürnberg	1–3	Hamburger SV	Nuremberg
15:30 CET (UTC+01)	Vittek 82'	Match Report	31', 53' Takahara; 90+1' Lauth	Stadium: Frankenstadion; Attendance: 22,264; Referee: Thorsten Kinhöfer; Man of the Match: Takahara

12 February 2005 21	Hertha BSC Berlin	2–1	1. FC Nürnberg	Berlin
15:30 CET (UTC+01)	N. Kovač 30' (pen.); Wichniarek 90'	Match Report	79' Mintál	Stadium: Olympic Stadium; Attendance: 38,518; Referee: Michael Weiner; Man of the Match: Bastürk

19 February 2005 22	1. FC Nürnberg	2–4	Bayer 04 Leverkusen	Nuremberg
15:30 CET (UTC+01)	Mintál 30', 53'	Match Report	3', 60' Berbatov; 33' Ramelow; 79' Krzynowek	Stadium: Frankenstadion; Attendance: 20,216; Referee: Florian Meyer; Man of the Match: Mintál

26 February 2005 23	Arminia Bielefeld	3–1	1. FC Nürnberg	Bielefeld
15:30 CET (UTC+01)	Buckley 6'; Owomoyela 19'; R. Pinto 72'	Match Report	30' Mintál	Stadium: Alm; Attendance: 16,462; Referee: Knut Kircher; Man of the Match: Mintál

6 March 2005 24	1. FC Nürnberg	2–2	Borussia Dortmund	Nuremberg
17:30 CET (UTC+01)	Mintál 76'; Vittek 89' (pen.)	Match Report	62' Wörns; 85' (pen.) Rosický	Stadium: Frankenstadion; Attendance: 28,106; Referee: Manuel Gräfe; Man of the Match: Dirk Langerbein

12 March 2005 25	SC Freiburg	2–3	1. FC Nürnberg	Freiburg
15:30 CET (UTC+01)	Koejoe 7'; Bajramović 59'	Match Report	23' L. Müller; 85', 90+1' Mintál	Stadium: Dreisamstadion; Attendance: 20,700; Referee: Lutz Wagner; Man of the Match: Mintál

19 March 2005 26	1. FC Nürnberg	1–2	Werder Bremen	Nuremberg
15:30 CET (UTC+01)	Kießling 69'	Match Report	22', 45' Klasnić	Stadium: Frankenstadion; Attendance: 27,525; Referee: Michael Weiner; Man of the Match: Klasnić

2 April 2005 27	FC Schalke 04	4–1	1. FC Nürnberg	Gelsenkirchen
15:30 CET (UTC+01)	Hanke 24', 36'; Aílton 40'; Lincoln 74'	Match Report	55' Slovak	Stadium: Arena AufSchalke; Attendance: 61,524 (sell-out); Referee: Lutz Wagner; Man of the Match: Hanke

10 April 2005 28	1. FC Nürnberg	3–0	FC Hansa Rostock	Nuremberg
17:30 CET (UTC+01)	Wagefeld 59', 88'; Mintál 68'	Match Report		Stadium: Frankenstadion; Attendance: 32,855; Referee: Lutz-Michael Fröhlich; Man of the Match: Wagefeld

17 April 2005 29	VfL Wolfsburg	0–1	1. FC Nürnberg	Wolfsburg
17:30 CET (UTC+01)		Match Report	63' Kießling	Stadium: Volkswagen-Arena; Attendance: 19,276; Referee: Markus Merk; Man of the Match: Schäfer

24 April 2005 30	1. FC Nürnberg	0–0	Borussia Mönchengladbach	Nuremberg
15:30 CET (UTC+01)		Match Report		Stadium: Frankenstadion; Attendance: 43,019; Referee: Michael Weiner; Man of the Match: Keller

1 May 2005 31	Hannover 96	1–0	1. FC Nürnberg	Hannover
17:30 CET (UTC+01)	Kaufman 87'	Match Report		Stadium: Niedersachsenstadion; Attendance: 40,017; Referee: Peter Gagelmann; Man of the Match: Enke

7 May 2005 32	1. FC Nürnberg	2–1	VfL Bochum	Nuremberg
15:30 CET (UTC+01)	Daun 21'; Mintál 84'	Match Report	90+2' Meichelbeck	Stadium: Frankenstadion; Attendance: 44,560; Referee: Markus Merk; Man of the Match: Mintál

14 May 2005 33	FC Bayern Munich	6–3	1. FC Nürnberg	Munich
15:30 CEST (UTC+02)	Pizarro 8'; Ballack 24'; Makaay 31', 41'; Deisler 44', 78'	Match Report	52' (o.g.) Demichelis; 80', 83' Slovák	Stadium: Olympic Stadium; Attendance: 63,000 (sell-out); Referee: Lutz-Michael Fröhlich; Man of the Match: Makaay

21 May 2005 34	1. FC Nürnberg	1–2	FSV Mainz 05	Nuremberg
15:30 CEST (UTC+02)	Mintál 18' (pen.)	Match Report	15' Weiland; 87' Thurk	Stadium: Frankenstadion; Attendance: 41,000; Referee: Knut Kircher; Man of the Match: Thurk

=== DFB-Pokal ===
20 August 2004 1	FC Teningen	1–2	1. FC Nürnberg	Teningen
18:30 CEST (UTC+02)	Fischer 34'	Match Report	64' Aidoo; 90+3' Kießling	Stadium: Emil-Schindler-Stadion; Attendance: 3,000; Referee: Knut Kircher

21 September 2004 2	1. FC Nürnberg	2–3 (a.e.t.)	LR Ahlen	Nuremberg
19:00 CEST (UTC+02)	Mintál 20'; Vittek 44'	Match Report	56', 113' Bamba; 59' Gorschlüter	Stadium: Frankenstadion; Attendance: 6,566; Referee: Robert Hoyzer

== Player information ==
=== Roster and statistics ===
Squad Season 2004–05 Sources:
Player					Bundesliga		DFB-Pokal		Totals	
Player	Nat.	Birthday	at FCN since	Previous club	Matches	Goals	Matches	Goal	Matches	Goals
Goalkeepers
Raphael Schäfer	German	30 January 1979	2001	VfB Lübeck	26	0	1	0	27	0
Dirk Langerbein	German	9 September 1971	2005	MSV Duisburg	3	0	0	0	3	0
Daniel Klewer	German	4 March 1977	2004	F.C. Hansa Rostock	5	0	1	0	6	0
Defenders
Frank Wiblishauser	German	18 October 1977	2000	FC Bayern Munich	13	0	0	0	13	0
Tomasz Hajto	Polish	16 October 1972	2004	FC Schalke 04	17	0	1	0	18	0
Andreas Wolf	German	12 June 1982	2002	1. FC Nürnberg II	16	0	2	0	18	0
Marek Nikl	Czech	20 February 1976	1998	Bohemians 1905	25	0	1	0	26	0
Mario Cantaluppi	Swiss	11 April 1974	2004	FC Basel	26	0	1	0	27	0
Leandro da Silva	Brazilian	6 July 1982	2004	América	3	0	0	0	3	0
Bartosz Bosacki	Polish	20 December 1975	2004	Lech Poznań	13	0	0	0	13	0
Dominik Reinhardt	German	19 December 1984	2002	1. FC Nürnberg II	13	0	2	0	15	0
Thomas Paulus	German	14 March 1982	2003	1. FC Nürnberg II	9	0	2	0	11	0
Midfielders
Sven Müller	German	4 April 1980	2004	VfL Wolfsburg	33	3	2	0	35	3
Marcel Ketelaer	German	3 November 1977	2004	Borussia Mönchengladbach	4	0	1	0	5	0
Ivica Banović	Croatian	2 August 1980	2004	Werder Bremen	22	3	2	0	24	3
Marek Mintál	Slovakian	2 September 1977	2003	MŠK Žilina	34	24	1	1	35	25
Tommy Svindal Larsen	Norwegian	11 August 1973	2001	Stabæk IF	29	0	1	0	30	0
Lars Müller	German	22 March 1976	2001	Alemannia Aachen	33	2	2	0	35	2
Pekka Lagerblom	Finnish	19 October 1982	2005	Werder Bremen	11	0	0	0	11	0
Maik Wagefeld	German	25 February 1981	2004	Dynamo Dresden	21	2	0	0	21	2
Samuel Slovak	Slovakian	17 October 1975	2004	Slovan Liberec	13	3	1	0	14	3
Forwards
Markus Daun	German	10 September 1980	2004	Werder Bremen	20	1	2	0	22	1
Markus Schroth	German	25 January 1975	2004	TSV 1860 München	23	7	1	0	24	7
Lawrence Aidoo	Ghanaian	14 January 1982	2004	Borussia Mönchengladbach	7	0	1	1	8	1
Stefan Kießling	German	25 January 1984	2003	1. FC Nürnberg II	27	3	2	1	28	4
Róbert Vittek	Slovakian	1 April 1982	2003	Slovan Bratislava	24	5	1	1	25	6
