= R6 (cigarette) =

German cigarette brand

- Product type: Cigarette
- Current owner: Reemtsma, a subsidiary of Imperial Tobacco
- Produced by: Reemtsma, a subsidiary of Imperial Tobacco
- Country: Weimar Republic
- Introduced: 1921; 105 years ago
- Markets: See Markets

R6 is a German brand of cigarettes, currently owned and manufactured by Reemtsma, a subsidiary of Imperial Brands.

== History ==
Hans Domizlaff developed the brands, R6 (launched in 1921) and Ernte 23. The filterless R6 variant was taken off the market for a short period of time, but was re-introduced in 1932.

In 1949, R6 cigarettes were once again taken off the market and only returned in the late 1969 after an absence of over 20 years. R6 is available as a filter cigarette in King size and 100 mm format.

== Marketing ==
An old German pack of R6 cigarettes, with a German text warning at the bottom of the pack

From 1932 until 1939, Reemtsma created various advertisement posters for the time-consuming reintroduction campaign of the R6 brand, which was temporarily taken off the market. 54 consecutive ads explained in detail the route of the tobacco from sowing to the finished cigarette. The original photos from the cultivation countries and from the production in Bahrenfeld guaranteed the noble origin of the Oriental tobaccos and the careful handling of the valuable natural product. In high circulation, the series was also distributed as an informational brochure on the fermentation. A later campaign for the R6 used the prestige as the "most modern cigarettes factory in the world" (Berliner Illustrirte Zeitung 1930) and proved it with pictures from the factory and technical details. Also in 1932, Reemtsma settled a collection of R6 image checks to collect. A complete set of these image checks were given to collectors, and the images were glued into albums. These albums had a wide range of topics, for example the 1932 Summer Olympics and the 1936 Summer Olympics, as well as German fairy tales and Gothic paintings.

From 1933 to 1941, there was also a picture series on Nazi topics as the "Battle For The Third Reich" and the "Raubstaat England".

In the 1970s and 1980s, Reemtsma also made various advertising posters to promote R6.

== Markets ==
R6 is mainly sold in Germany, but is also available in other places including Switzerland, Austria, Italy, Greece and Argentina.

== Products ==
- R6

Below are all the current brands of R6 cigarettes sold, with the levels of tar, nicotine and carbon monoxide included.

Pack	Tar	Nicotine	Carbon monoxide
R6	4 mg	0,4 mg	4 mg

== See also ==
- Tobacco smoking
