= Reyno (cigarette) =

Menthol cigarette brand

Reyno was the brand name of a menthol cigarette from the R. J. Reynolds Tobacco Company.

== Brand Development ==
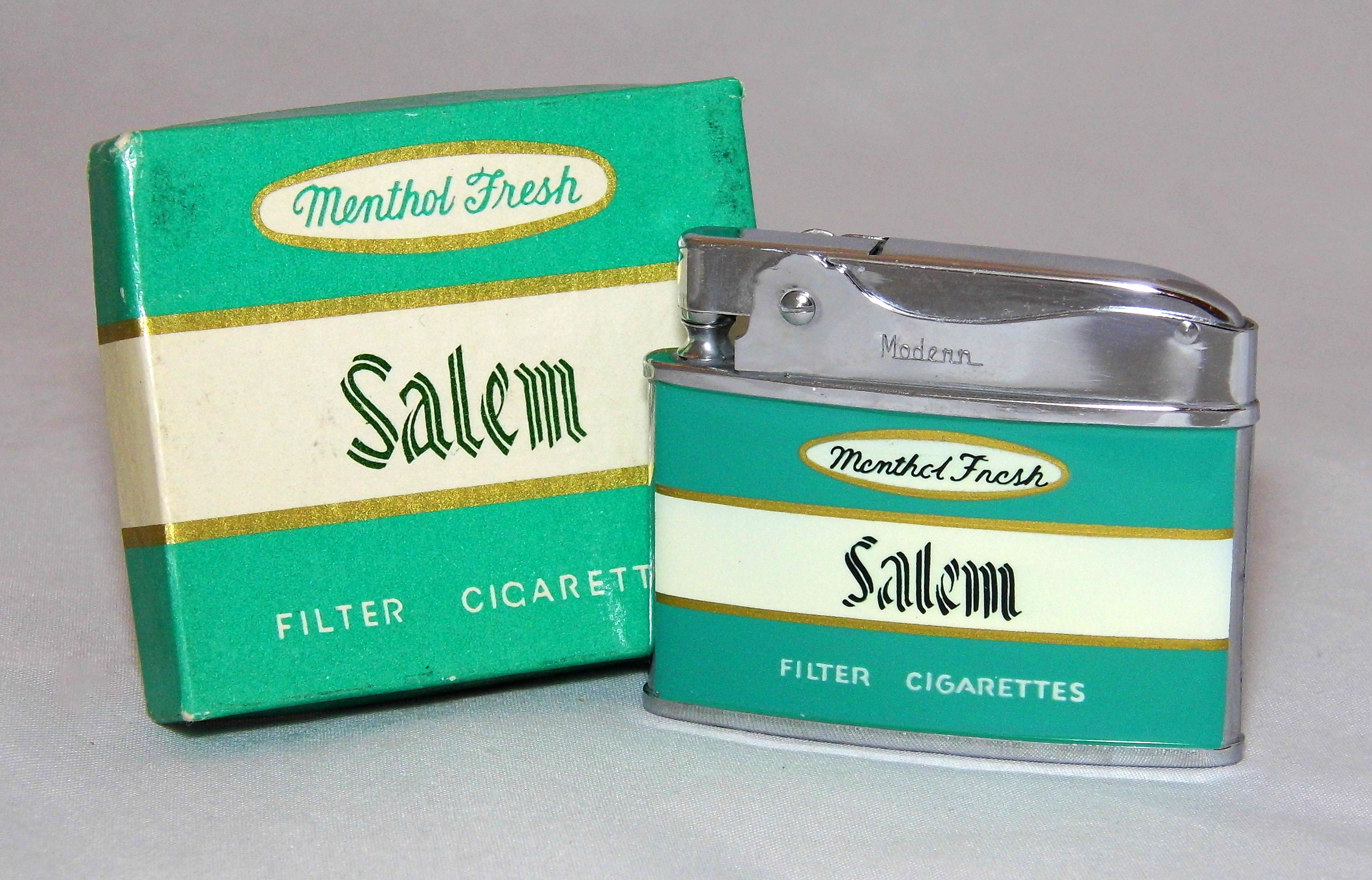
Salem, US counterpart to Reyno

The Reyno brand dates back to the tobacco company R. J. Reynolds Tobacco Company (RJR), founded in 1875. In Germany, it was distributed by Japan Tobacco International (JTI).

JTI launched the first filter cigarette (Winston Filters) in 1954 and the first menthol cigarette in 1956. While the American brand name Salem was derived from the company's headquarters in Winston-Salem, North Carolina, the German brand name Reyno came from the first five letters of the founder's last name, R. J. Reynolds.

Reyno cigarettes were sold in Germany from 1961 onwards, as the Hamburg-based Reemtsma Cigarette Factory owned the rights to the Salem brand name.

From November 2019, Reyno cigarettes were gradually integrated into the Winston brand family.

The end of the Reyno brand was sealed after the use of menthol as a tobacco additive was banned in the European Union (EU) in 2020.
