= Holzbach (Ahse) =

River in Germany

Location
- Country: Germany
- States: North Rhine-Westphalia

Physical characteristics
- Mouth
  - location: Ahse
  - coordinates: 51.6305°N 8.0140°E

Basin features
- Progression: Ahse→ Lippe→ Rhine→ North Sea

Holzbach (German pronunciation: [ˈhɔlt͡sˌbax]) is a small river of North Rhine-Westphalia, Germany. It is 3.9 km long and a left tributary of the Ahse.

== See also ==
- List of rivers of North Rhine-Westphalia
