= Soestbach =

River in Germany

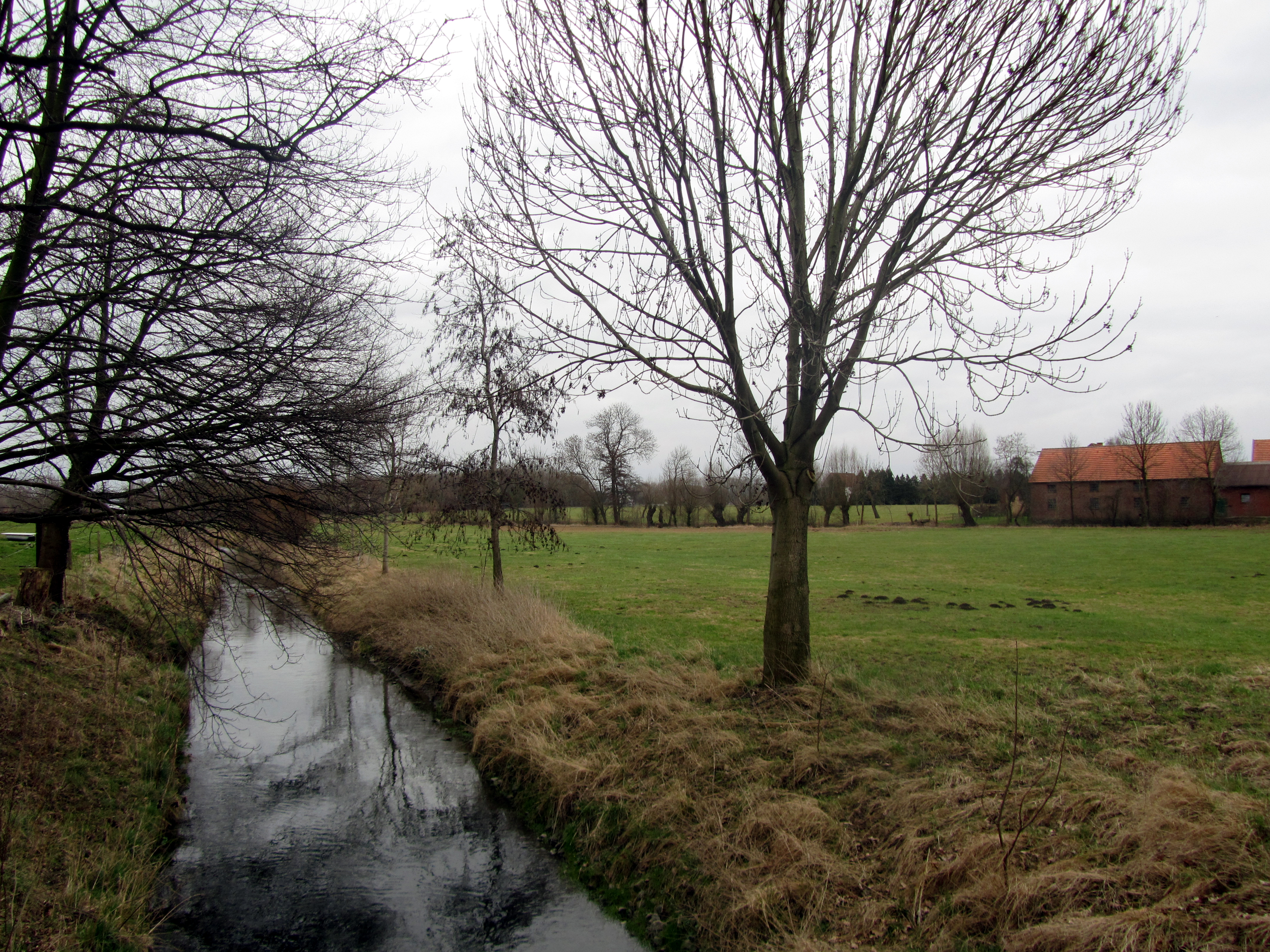

Location
- Country: Germany
- State: North Rhine-Westphalia

Physical characteristics
- Mouth
  - location: Ahse
  - coordinates: 51.6306°N 8.0214°E
- Length: 13.1 km (8.1 mi)

Basin features
- Progression: Ahse→ Lippe→ Rhine→ North Sea

Soestbach is a river of North Rhine-Westphalia, Germany. It flows into the Ahse near Berwicke.

== See also ==
- List of rivers of North Rhine-Westphalia
