= David Schnur =

Austrian tobacco entrepreneur

David Schnur (April 9, 1882, in Baranów, German Empire – March 16, 1948, in New York City, US) was an Austrian tobacco entrepreneur.

== Early life ==
Schnur's parents were the merchant Markus Schnur (born 1820 in Tarnów; died 1900 in Tarnów) and Else, née Neumann, the daughter of a businessman from Pressburg. David lived mostly in Prussia from the age of about ten.

== Career in the tobacco industry ==
In 1903, Schnur held an executive position at the Karmitri-Zigarettenfabrik AG cigarette factory in Berlin, which had been founded in 1880. He became its majority shareholder. He acquired Hadges-Nessim-Zigarettenfabrik GmbH in Hamburg and a trust company.

During the First World War, Schnur was a member of the presidium of the procurement office for raw tobacco. Recruited by 1920 by the Reemtsma brothers, who had no knowledge of tobacco themselves but developed machines for cigarette production, Schur directed the purchase of tobacco and the composition of tobacco mixtures in return for a share of the profits. In 1921 he took a stake in Reemtsma Cigarettenfabriken, becoming a partner in the company and a member of Reentsma's board of directors.

Schnur traveled frequently to the tobacco-growing areas in the Balkans. In 1923, he purchased a crop in Thessaloniki. Hans Domizlaff called the new cigarette Harvest 23.

Reemtsma moved its headquarters to Hamburg in 1922 attracted by the advantages of the free port. In 1924, Karmitri was merged with Reemtsma. During his travels, Schnur established contacts in government circles and became Turkish consul in Berlin. In 1929, the University Braunschweig awarded him an honorary doctorate. Until Hitler came to power, Schnur headed Reentsma's tobacco growing interests.

His son Harry C. Schnur, born in Berlin in 1907, received German citizenship in 1920.

== Nazi-era persecution and exile ==
Following complaints by Hitler's SA that Reemtsma was producing Jewish cigarettes, expatriation proceedings were initiated against him in 1935. Schnur escaped a raid by the Gestapo in early July and emigrated to the US via France in 1939. He later acquired American citizenship and died in the US in 1948.

== See also ==
- Reetsma
- History of tobacco
- Hans Domizlaff
- The Holocaust in Austria
