= 6R =

6R may refer to:

- Ford 6R transmission, a 2006 6-speed automatic transmission
- Kawasaki Ninja ZX-6R, a 1995 middleweight sport bike
- Ponceau 6R, a red azo dye
- Yaesu VX-6R, a triple band handheld amateur radio transceiver
- A standard consumer print size for photographs. See Standard photographic print sizes.
- 6R, the production code for the 1984 Doctor Who serial The Caves of Androzani

== See also ==
- R6 (disambiguation)
