= Smoking in Germany =

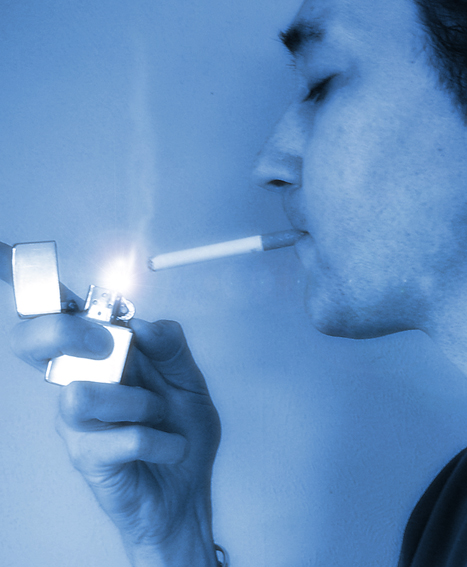
Cigarette smoker

In Germany, smoking is widespread and is subject to very few and lax regulations compared to other European countries. Tobacco taxes in Germany are among the lowest in Europe. Germany ranks last on the Tobacco Control Scale and has sometimes been referred to as the "smoker's paradise" of Europe. According to German addiction researcher Heino Stöver, Germany has "[...] more cigarette vending machines than any other country in the world."

Under federal law, the manufacture, import, distribution, and advertisement of tobacco is regulated, while the 16 federal states of Germany each have their own legislation regarding smoking in public places, which range from relatively weak regulations to full smoking bans in all licensed premises, childcare facilities, schools and governmental institutions.

As of 2024, nearly 40% of the German population live in the three states which ban smoking in all restaurants, pubs, cafés and nightclubs (Bavaria, North Rhine-Westphalia, and Saarland). The other 13 states permit smoking in designated rooms or in bars with a floor area of less than 75 square metres (810 sq ft).

According to a 2013 micro-census survey, 24.5% of the German population aged fifteen years and over are smokers (29% of men, 20% of women). Among the 18–25 age group, 35.2% are smokers.

Upon the legalization of Cannabis in Germany, the federal smoking ban was amended to incorporate cannabis products; the Cannabis Act prohibits consumption of cannabis in the presence of minors. Proprietors of spaces where the law permits both tobacco and cannabis consumption may establish their own house rules. The Deutsche Bahn prohibits cannabis consumption in all train stations in Germany, including in its designated smoking areas.

== Prevalence ==
In 2005, 27% of the population were current smokers. 23% were daily smokers (28% of men and 19% of women), while 4% smoked occasionally. The highest ratio of daily smokers was in the 20–24 age group: 38% of men and 30% of women. According to a 2010 study by Bielefeld University, 9.9% of all 15-year-old males and 10.8% of 15-year-old females smoked daily, which showed a strong decline during the previous decade.

As in other industrial countries, the prevalence of smoking in Germany is lower among people with higher education levels.

According to RKI's GEDA survey series, prevalence of smoking in Germany fell from 32.1% in 2003 to 28.8% in 2022/2023.

The DEBRA surveys, which are nationally representative, collect data on smoking habits in Germany. Between June 2016 and May 2017, data was collected from 12,273 people aged 14 and over. The results showed that the one-year prevalence of tobacco consumption was 28.3% among the entire survey population, and 11.9% among those under 18. Subsequent data indicate that the number of smokers increased specifically during the Covid-19 pandemic. The percentage of smokers in Germany increased from 27% in 2020 to 34.5% by August 2022.

A 2009 comparative study found that 25.1% of male and 20.6% of female medical students in Göttingen smoked, while in London the percentages were only 10.9% and 9.1%.

Germany had one of the largest numbers of cigarette vending machines per capita in the world.

In 2018, a German Health Interview and Examination Survey of Children and Adolescents (KiGGS Wave 2) showed that 7.2% of children and adolescents between the ages of 11 and 17 smoked on occasion, and 3.7% smoked daily.

=== Prevalence per federal state ===
Smoking prevalence among people aged 15 and over (%)
State	1999	2005	2013	2017	2021¹	2025²
Baden-Württemberg	26.1	24.5	22.2	21.2	17.3	16.5
Bavaria	26.0	24.2	22.1	20.5	17.0	17.5
Berlin	35.5	32.7	28.9	25.5	21.4	20.0
Brandenburg	31.0	29.0	25.8	24.5	19.2	18.9
Bremen	33.7	30.8	27.8	27.4	22.7	21.9
Hamburg	32.8	29.8	25.6	23.1	18.8	17.5
Hesse	28.0	25.9	23.4	21.1	19.3	19.2
Mecklenburg-Western Pomerania	32.1	33.3	28.2	27.7	23.7	25.0
Lower Saxony	28.8	28.1	24.7	22.9	18.7	19.1
North Rhine-Westphalia	28.5	29.0	25.9	22.6	18.7	19.4
Rhineland-Palatinate	29.0	26.0	23.9	21.7	18.9	18.1
Saarland	28.4	26.2	23.5	20.6	18.6	18.7
Saxony	24.5	24.4	22.7	21.5	21.1	20.8
Saxony-Anhalt	29.2	27.9	27.8	24.8	22.5	24.4
Schleswig-Holstein	31.7	29.5	25.9	23.5	19.4	20.2
Thuringia	26.8	27.2	26.1	26.2	23.4	23.0
Germany	28.3	27.2	24.5	22.4	18.9	19.1

1 – results based on the 2020 micro-census survey data

2 – results from the first micro-census

The data shows that the proportion of people aged 15 and over who smoked at least occasionally declined approximately 9% from 1999-2025. However, due to methodological changes, the results of the 2020 micro-census are only comparable to those of subsequent survey years to a limited extent. This is because the 2020 survey was affected by certain restrictions. Although regional differences remained, smoking prevalence decreased across all 16 federal states. Among them, the highest smoking prevalence recorded was 35.5% in Berlin in 1999, while the lowest was 16.5% in Baden-Wurttemberg in 2025.

=== Cigarette smoking among adults ===
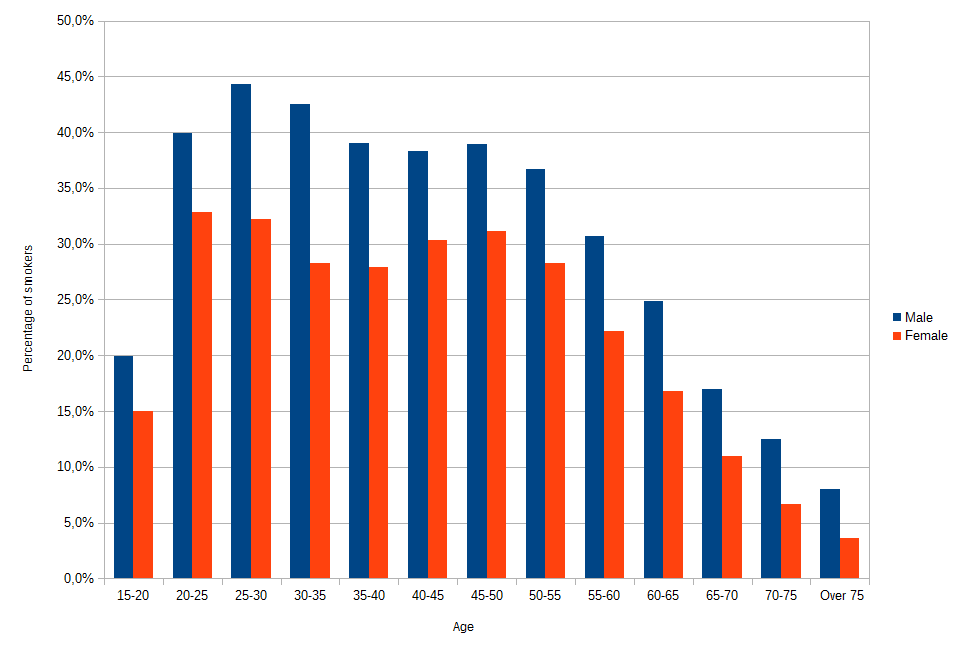
Smoking rate among adults by age and gender

According to a 2013 micro-census, about one in four (24.5%) people aged 15 years and over was a smoker: 20.9% regularly, and 3.6% occasionally. The rate of ex-smokers was 19.3%. The average age at which smokers begin is 17.8 years of age (in the age group of 15- to 20-year-olds the average age is 15.4 years).

For the 2025 micro-census, 60.9% of the total population of 71,639, shared information on their smoking habits. The data shows that 78.5% of smokers smoked cigarettes and only 9.2% preferred e-cigarettes. Furthermore, it revealed that 19.1% of individuals aged 15 and over in Germany were smokers, while 80.9% were either former smokers or had never smoked. This figure is lower than the 22.4% recorded in 2017.

Percentage of smokers by age and gender
Age (y)	Male	Female
15–20	19.9%	15.0%
20–25	39.9%	32.8%
25–30	44.3%	32.2%
30–35	42.5%	28.3%
35–40	39.0%	27.9%
40–45	38.3%	30.3%
45–50	38.9%	31.1%
50–55	36.7%	28.3%
55–60	30.7%	22.2%
60–65	24.9%	16.8%
65–70	17.0%	11.0%
70–75	12.5%	6.7%
over 75	8.0%	3.6%

=== Annual cigarette consumption per capita ===
In 2010, an average of 229 million cigarettes were smoked every day, corresponding to 1,021 cigarettes per capita.

Smoking behaviour by age and gender – as of 2006
Smoking behaviour	Women, 18 to 29	Women, 30 to 44	Women, 45 to 64	Women, 65 and older	Women, total	Men, 18 to 29	Men, 30 to 44	Men, 45 to 64	Men, 65 and older	Men, total
Daily smokers	33.6%	29.3%	22.0%	5.1%	21.9%	39.3%	36.0%	26.1%	11.8%	29.2%
Occasional smokers	11.0%	7.4%	5.3%	2.4%	6.1%	14.4%	8.3%	6.9%	3.8%	8.1%
Ex-smokers	14.6%	24.1%	25.5%	21.2%	22.3%	14.7%	23.9%	38.2%	52.1%	31.8%
Never smoked	40.8%	39.2%	47.2%	71.3%	49.7%	31.5%	31.8%	28.8%	32.4%	30.9%

=== Cigarette consumption per day ===
Amount of smoked cigarettes per day, per Sozio-oekonomisches Panel (SOEP).

Source: Sozio-oekonomische Panel (SOEP)
Cigarettes	Percentage, 2006	Percentage, 2012
0–4	7%	14.7%
5–9	14%	26.5%
10–14	22%	19.8%
15–19	18%	26.5%
20–24	24%	5.6%
25–29	5%	4.4%
30–34	5%	2.6%
35–39	1%	—
40 and more	4%	—

=== Tobacco consumption from 1991 until 2013 ===
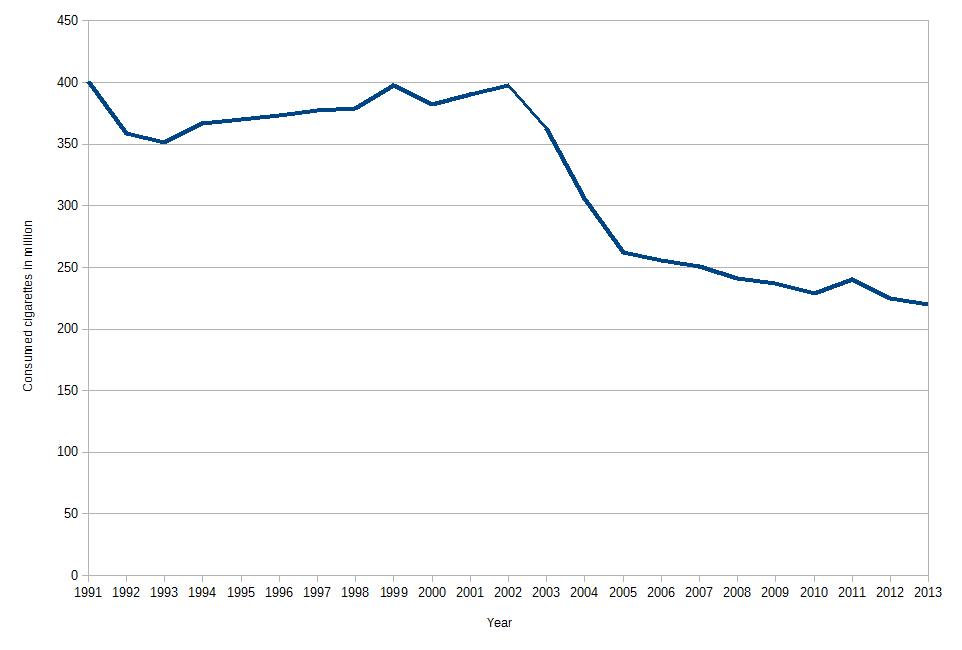
Cigarette consumption per year from 1991 until 2013

Average amount of cigarettes smoked daily, by year.

Source: Federal Statistical Office of Germany
Year	Cigarettes (in millions)
1991	401
1992	359
1993	351
1994	367
1995	370
1996	373
1997	377
1998	379
1999	398
2000	382
2001	390
2002	398
2003	363
2004	306
2005	262
2006	256
2007	251
2008	241
2009	237
2010	229
2011	240
2012	225
2013	220

=== Vaping ===
According to Debra surveys, e-cigarette use among people aged 14 and over increased between 2016 and 2023 from an estimated 1.6% to 2.2%. The types of devices used also changed during this period. The use of refilable tank systems peaked in 2017 and then declined. In 2023, the most common type of e-cigarette in use was that of a disposable kind, with a prevalence of 0.8%, whereas the use of Pod-system devices was estimated at 0.6%. During that time, 77.7% where classified as dual users, consuming both tobacco and e-cigarettes.

In the 2023/2024 observational study, e-cigarettes were the most commonly consumed nicotine product in both age groups of children with 2.9% and adolescents with 13.9%.

In September 2026, the results of the 2025/26 Prevention Radar, a school-based study of 28,554 pupils across 15 federal states, found that disposable e-cigarettes had the highest 30-day prevalence among the products examined. Disposable e-cigarettes stood at 8.9% followed by conventional cigarettes at 7.5% and reusable e-cigarettes at 7.4%. Disposable e-cigarette use was considerably more prevalent in late adolescence, at 19.4%, compared to early adolescence, at 4.9%. Only 15.9% of current disposable vape users reported using no other examined nicotine product, while 70.6% also used reusable e-cigarettes and 61.3% also smoked conventional cigarettes.

== Other forms of nicotine consumption ==
A 2022/23 observational study of German students in grades 5–10 showed a 5.4% lifetime prevalence of the use of nicotine pouches.

Water pipe use in Germany stood at 1.5% in 2023. Among dual users, 94.2% also smoked cigarettes. Dual use increased generally between the measurement periods, rising from around 49.0% to 52.3%. Poly-use remained relatively low, but increased slightly from 8.9% to 11.2%.

== Smoking cessation ==
A German randomized trial compared residential and outpatient group smoking cessation treatments among treatment-seeking smokers recruited throughout Germany. The residential intervention included a nine-day cessation program with six daily therapy sessions and additional interventions within the daily structure and routines in the rehabilitation center. Whereas outpatient treatment was delivered in weekly sessions over several weeks. The findings showed that, at 12 months, 39.4% of participants assigned to residential treatment were still abstinent, compared to 24.2% of those assigned to outpatient treatment. The corresponding biochemically validated abstinence rates were 33.1% and 17.4%.

Further data from the German Smoking Behaviour Questionnaire, collected between 2016 and 2019, shows that approximately 19.9% of current smokers and recent ex-smokers had tried to quit smoking at least ones in the previous year. Among those who attempted to quit, 13% used at least one evidence-based cessation method during their recent attempt.

In the German healthcare systems without free access to evidence-based cessation therapy, low-income smokers are more likely to attempt to quit and less likely to use cessation methods like medication or nicotine replacement therapy compared to high-income smokers.

The study on the Motivation To Stop Scale (MTSS) using the DEBRA data from 2016 to 2021 showed that the German population has become more motivated to stop smoking, as evidenced by recent attempts to quit and the use of e-cigarettes. Those who used e-cigarettes to quit smoking had a higher success rate than those who attempted without aid.

Between 2021 and 2023 research has evaluated the effectiveness of Germany's national smoking cessation quitline. In a randomized trial including 905 adult daily smokers who were willing to quit, participants were assigned to either telephone counselling, or to a self-help brochure. At the three-month follow-up, the seven-day point-prevalence abstinence rate was 41.1% among participants assigned to telephone counselling, compared to 23.1% among those in the brochure group. After 12 months, the proportion of participants who had abstained from cigarettes for an extended period was 31.7% in the telephone counselling group and 17.8% in the control group. The respective figures for prolonged abstinence from all tobacco products were 30.8% and 15.2%. The results indicated that these measures effectively promote cessation rates and inform consumers about the risks of the increasing range of nicotine products available.

== Political measures against smoking ==
=== Misleading labels ===
Since 2003, it has been illegal to label a tobacco product as "light", "mild", "low-tar" or to use any other wording that might suggest the product causes less harm than other tobacco products.

=== Advertising ===
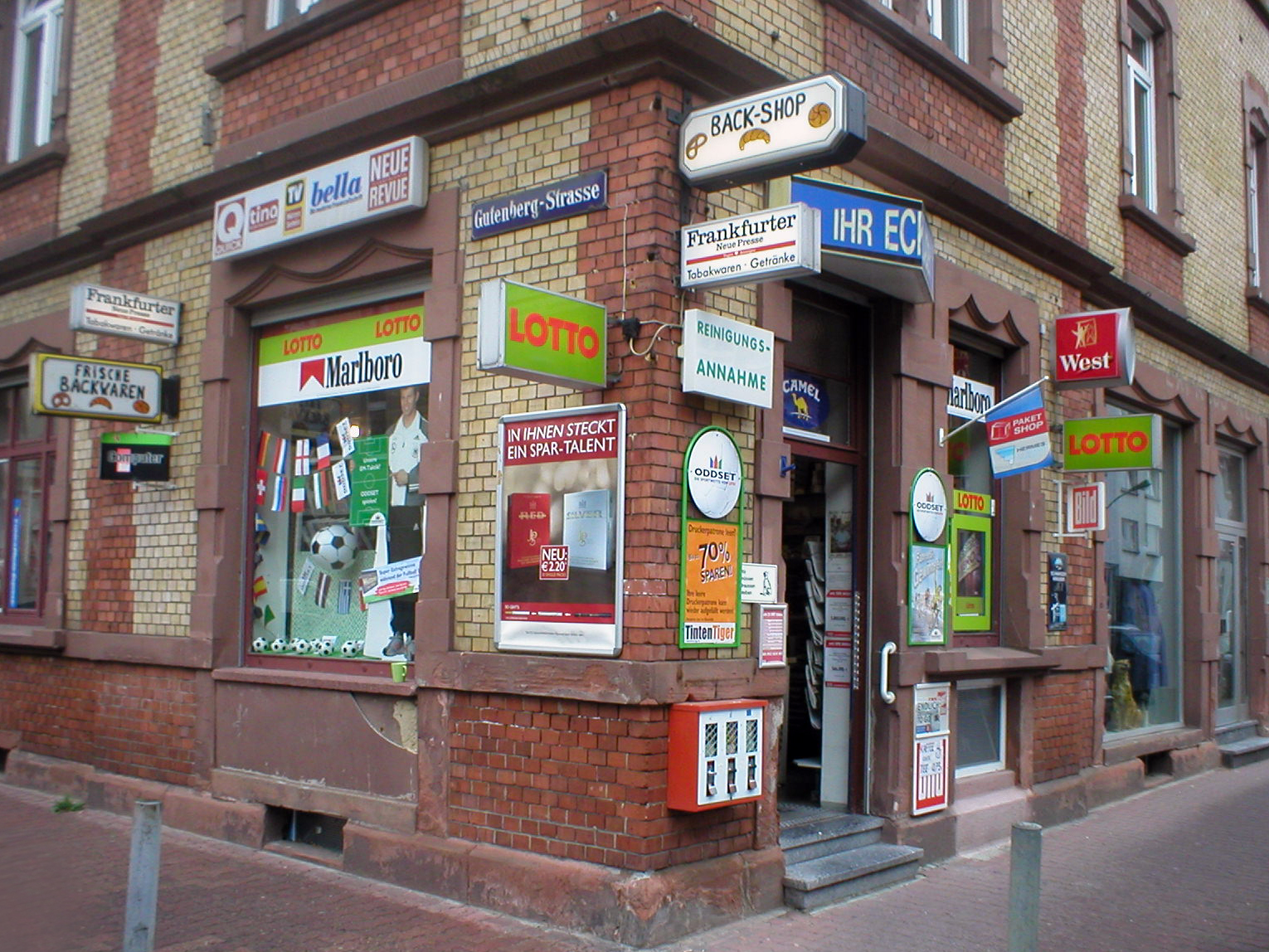
Tobacco advertising in front of a shop

Radio and television advertising for tobacco products was banned in 1975. The Rundfunkstaatsvertrag (Interstate Broadcasting Treaty) of 1999 extended the ban to include sponsorship of television and radio shows.

In 2002, the Protection of Young Persons Act prohibited tobacco advertising in cinemas before 6 p.m. On 1 January 2007, the EU Tobacco Advertising Directive came into force, banning tobacco advertising on the internet, in newspapers, and in magazines. It also prohibited sponsorship of events broadcast internationally.

In 2019, Chancellor Merkel campaigned for a ban on all tobacco advertising in Germany, but the bill never passed through the Bundestag.

Germany was the last EU member state to allow billboard and cinema advertising for tobacco, but this changed with new restrictions. On April 2016, the Tobacco Products Act (TabakerzG) came into effect. The amendment extended the existing advertising prohibitions to include nicotine-free electronic cigarettes and refill containers containing nicotine. Outdoor advertising is being phased out: tobacco products (from January 2022), heated tobacco (from January 2023), and e-cigarettes (from January 2024). Cinema advertising for tobacco was banned in 2021.

In 2023, the German Federal Ministry of Health (BMG) and the Baden-Württemberg Cancer Association funded a study into the advertising of tobacco and related products on social media. The results showed that especially retailers and manufacturers used common social media platforms to promote their products. Between February and March 2023, there were a total amount of 756 promotional posts on e-cigarettes spread across Facebook, Instagram, TikTok and Pinterest. Between February and September 2023, there were 432 promotional posts on heated tobacco products.

A 2014 study by the German Cancer Research Center (DKFZ), which examined German-language e-cigarette retailers' websites, found that 85% advertised e-cigarettes as less harmful than conventional tobacco cigarettes. According to Germany's Institute for Quality and Efficiency in Health Care (IQWiG), most harmful substances inhaled when smoking cigarettes are produced during tobacco combustion. The Federal Institute for Risk Assessment (BfR) similarly reports that e-cigarette aerosols contain substantially lower amounts of carcinogenic and other harmful substances than conventional cigarette smoke. However, the BfR cautions that e-cigarettes can still release carcinogenic substances, while nicotine remains addictive and has cardiovascular effects.

Advertising tobacco products remains permitted in domestic print media and via mail and telephone. It is also permitted to mark brands on physical structures and to target individuals directly. Advertising tobacco products in the form of toys or candy is also permitted.

=== Warning labels ===
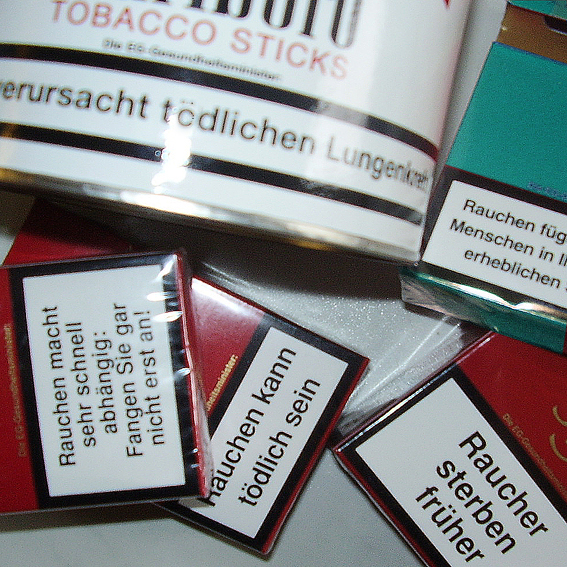
Tobacco packaging warning messages on cigarette packs in German

Under the 2014 EU Tobacco Products Directive II, cigarette, rolling tobacco and hookah tobacco packages must cover 65% of their surface with combined pictorial and textual warnings on both large sides, plus additional warnings on the smaller sides. This has been mandatory since May 2017. The pictures and warnings on the packages must change annually, and a supplemental message promoting smoking cessation support hotlines and websites must appear. On cigarettes, roll-your-own tobacco and hookah tobacco the packaging must bear the general health warning "Smoking is deadly", the information message "Tobacco smoke contains over 70 substances that have been proven to be carcinogenic." and must have a text-image warning.

=== Tobacco taxation ===
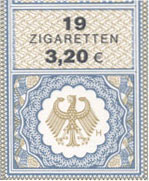
2003: €3.20 for 19 cigarettes

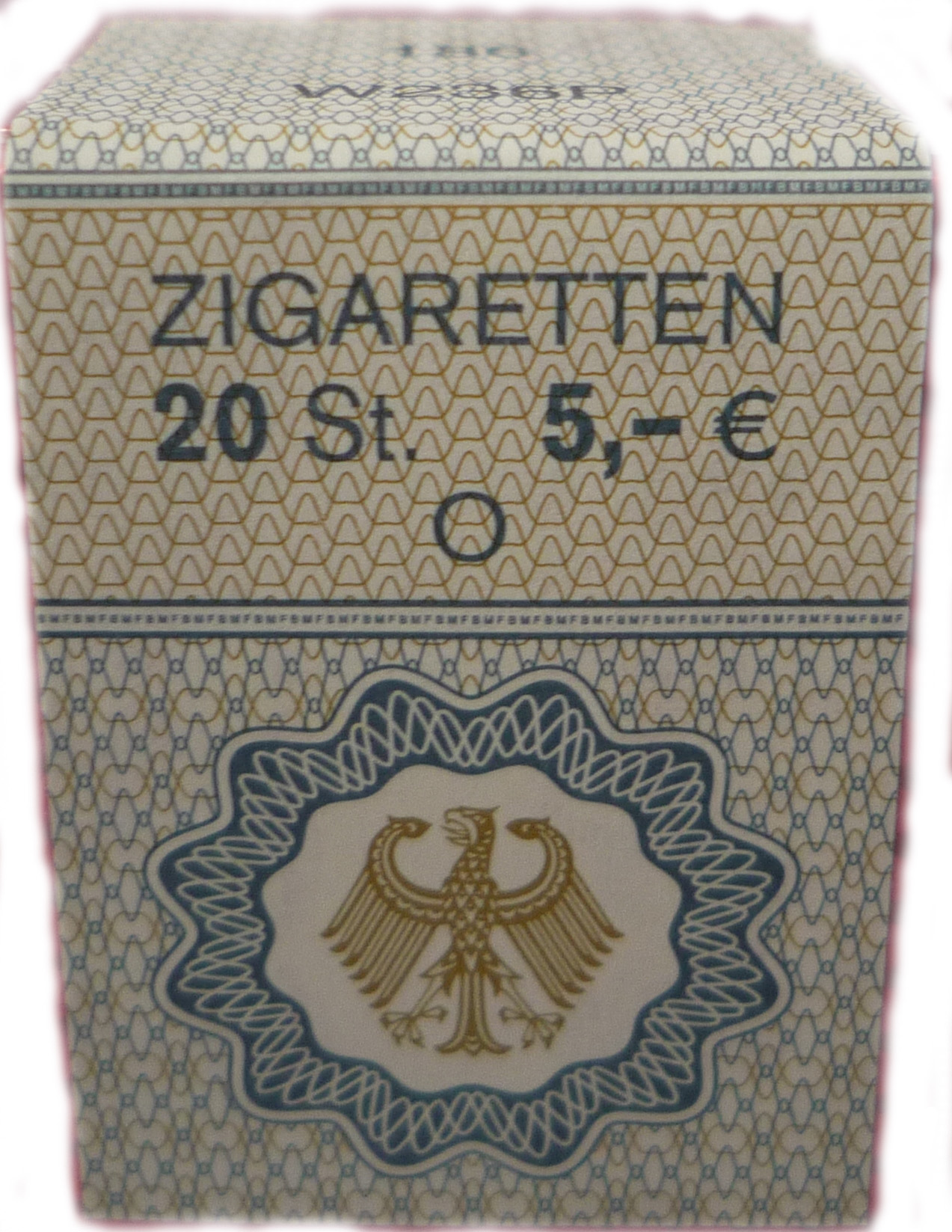
2014: €5.00 for 20 cigarettes

In Germany, tobacco tax is calculated based on both the quantity of tobacco and the retail price (§ 3 TabakStG). The tax amount is printed on the Steuerbanderole (tax strip) of each package.

In 2002 and 2003, tax increases were introduced to finance anti-terrorist measures. In 2004 and 2005, further increases supported health insurance. In 2010, tax hikes were scheduled for five consecutive years, from 2011 to 2015.

As of 2015, the tobacco tax was 9.82 cents per cigarette plus 21.69% of the retail price, with a minimum of 19.636 cents per cigarette (excluding VAT).

Example calculation for a pack of 19 cigarettes at €5.00
19 × €0.0982 + €5.00 × 21.69% = €1.87 + €1.08 = €2.95

=== Sale restrictions ===
Several laws regulate the retail sale of tobacco products in Germany.

- Age limits: Under the Protection of Young Persons Act, it is unlawful to sell or supply tobacco products to anyone under 18. It is also illegal to allow minors to smoke in public places. While minors do not commit a crime by purchasing or consuming tobacco, retailers and other responsible persons commit an offence if they sell or tolerate consumption by minors. Police are obliged to confiscate tobacco from underage smokers. Before 2007 the minimum age was 16. Since 2009, all vending machines require ID verification (bank card, ID card or driving licence) to ensure buyers are 18 or older.
- Package sizes: It is unlawful to sell packages containing fewer than 20 cigarettes or less than 30 g of fine-cut tobacco. Exceptions apply to cigars and cigarillos under certain conditions.
- Retail price maintenance: Tobacco must be sold at the retail price printed on the tax strip. The only exception is free samples for advertising.
- Prizes and promotions: Tobacco products may not be offered as prizes in commercial gaming or gambling, and no additional items may be included in a package except for change.

=== Federal smoking ban ===
The Federal Non-Smoking Protection Act (Bundesnichtraucherschutzgesetz, BNichtrSchG) introduced a smoking ban in:

- federal institutions and constitutional bodies of the federal government,
- public transportation,
- passenger stations of public railways.

The law does not apply to residential or accommodation facilities provided for personal use, and it allows for designated smoking rooms if federal conditions are met.

== Smoking ban by state ==
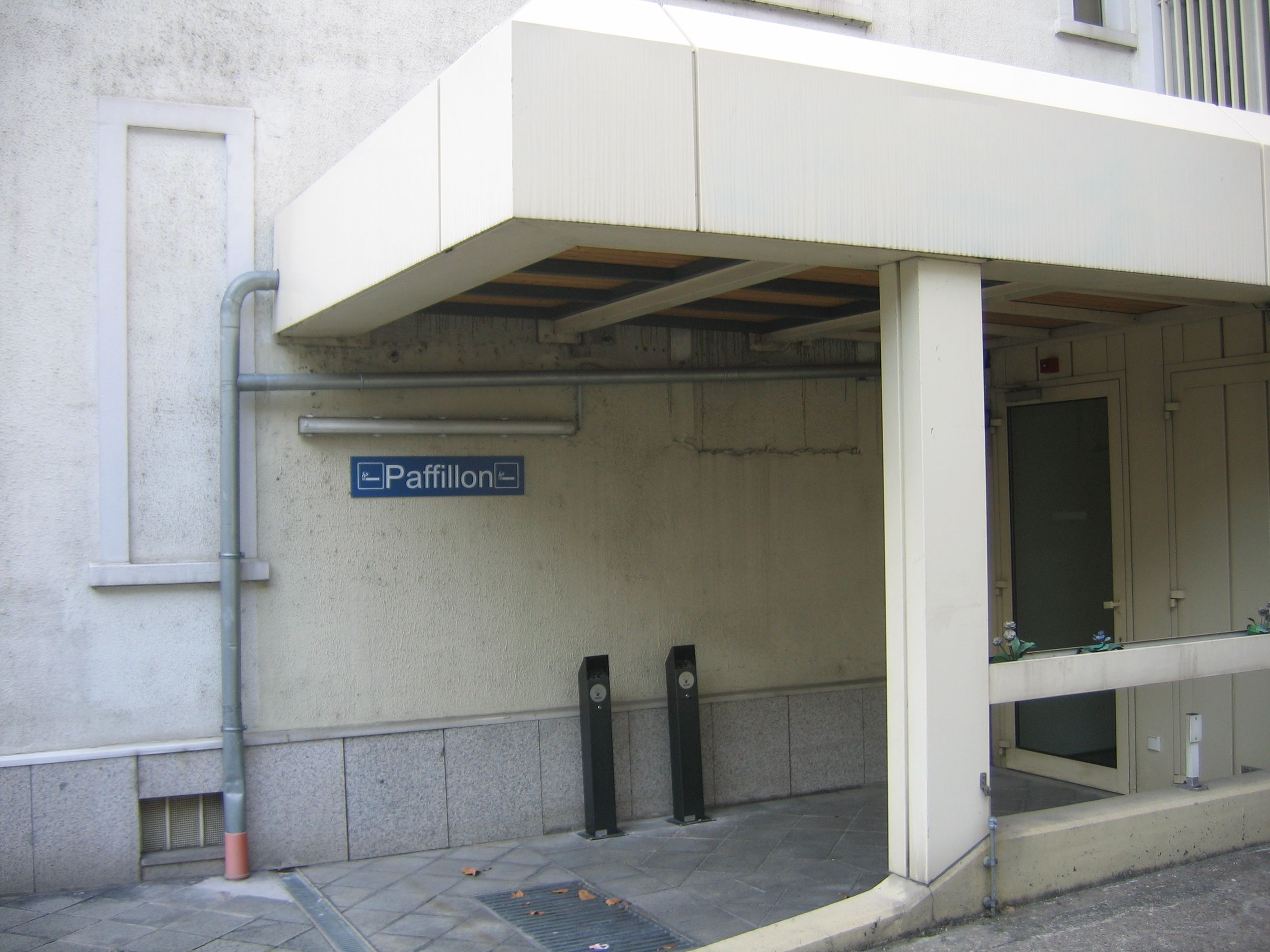
Smoking shelter in front of local administration

In Germany, the 16 federal states regulate smoking differently. The first smoking bans were introduced in 2007.

=== Baden-Württemberg ===
The non-smoking protection law does not apply to cultural institutions (except cinemas) and sports facilities unless they are part of a school.

- Restaurants, bars and discothèques: Ban with exceptions. Smoking is permitted in:
  - Completely separate rooms marked as smoking rooms.
  - Pubs and bars smaller than 75 m^{2}, with only one room, that serve no or only cold food, restrict access to adults over 18, and are clearly marked as a smoking pub.
  - In discothèques, the separate smoking room may not have a dance floor.
- Government institutions and prisons: Ban with exceptions. Exceptions exist for designated enclosed rooms and for special events. In prisons, smoking is allowed in cells inhabited exclusively by smokers.
- Hospitals and nursing homes: Ban with exceptions. Exceptions apply for patients in palliative care, certain psychiatric treatments, or in court-ordered placements.
- Schools: Ban with exceptions. Exceptions can be made for adult students (from class 11) and teachers in designated outdoor areas, subject to committee approvals.
- Day care and public transport: Complete ban.

=== Bavaria ===
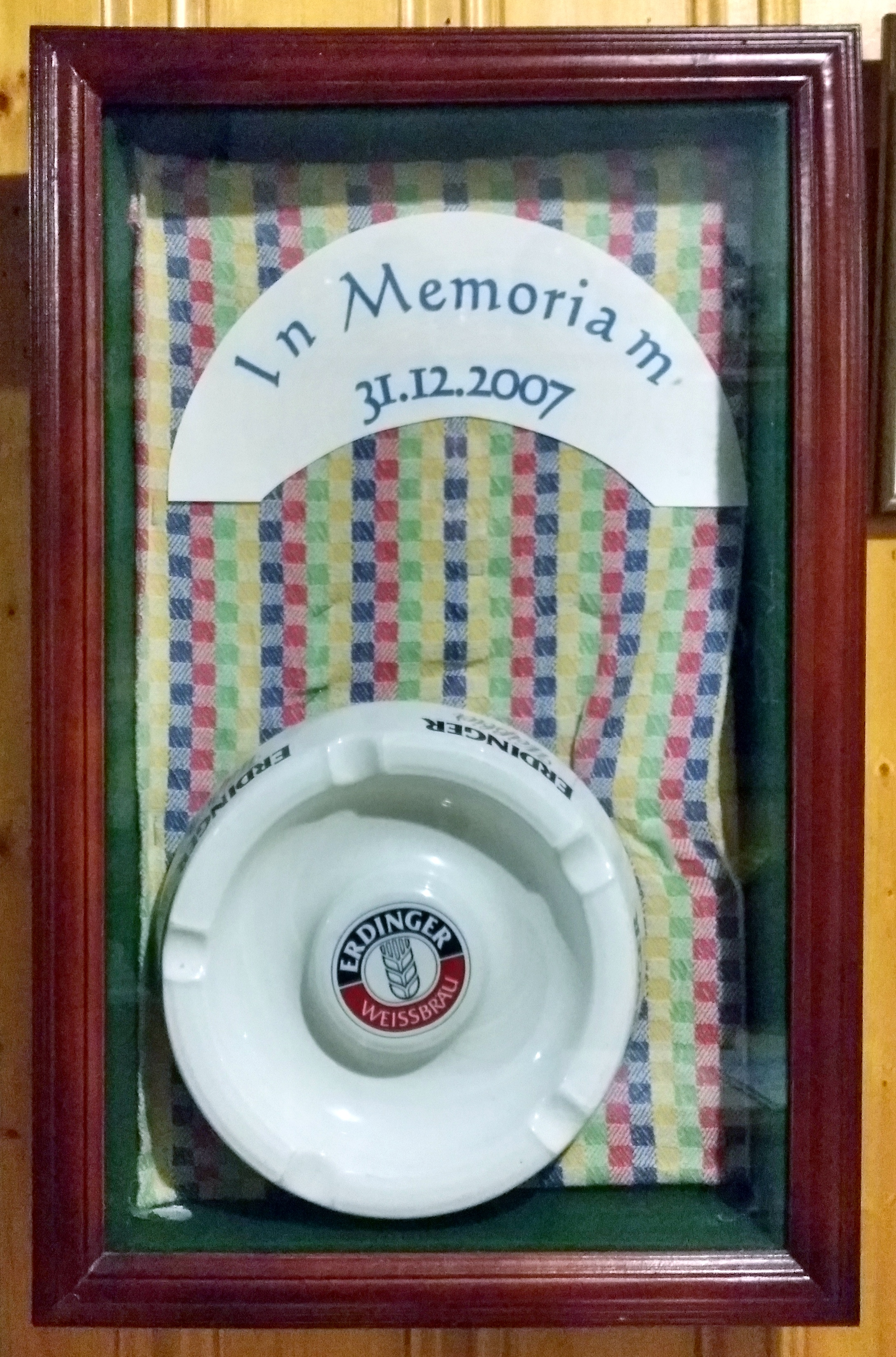
Memorial noting the introduction of the smoking ban in 2007 in all pubs, bars and restaurants in Bavaria

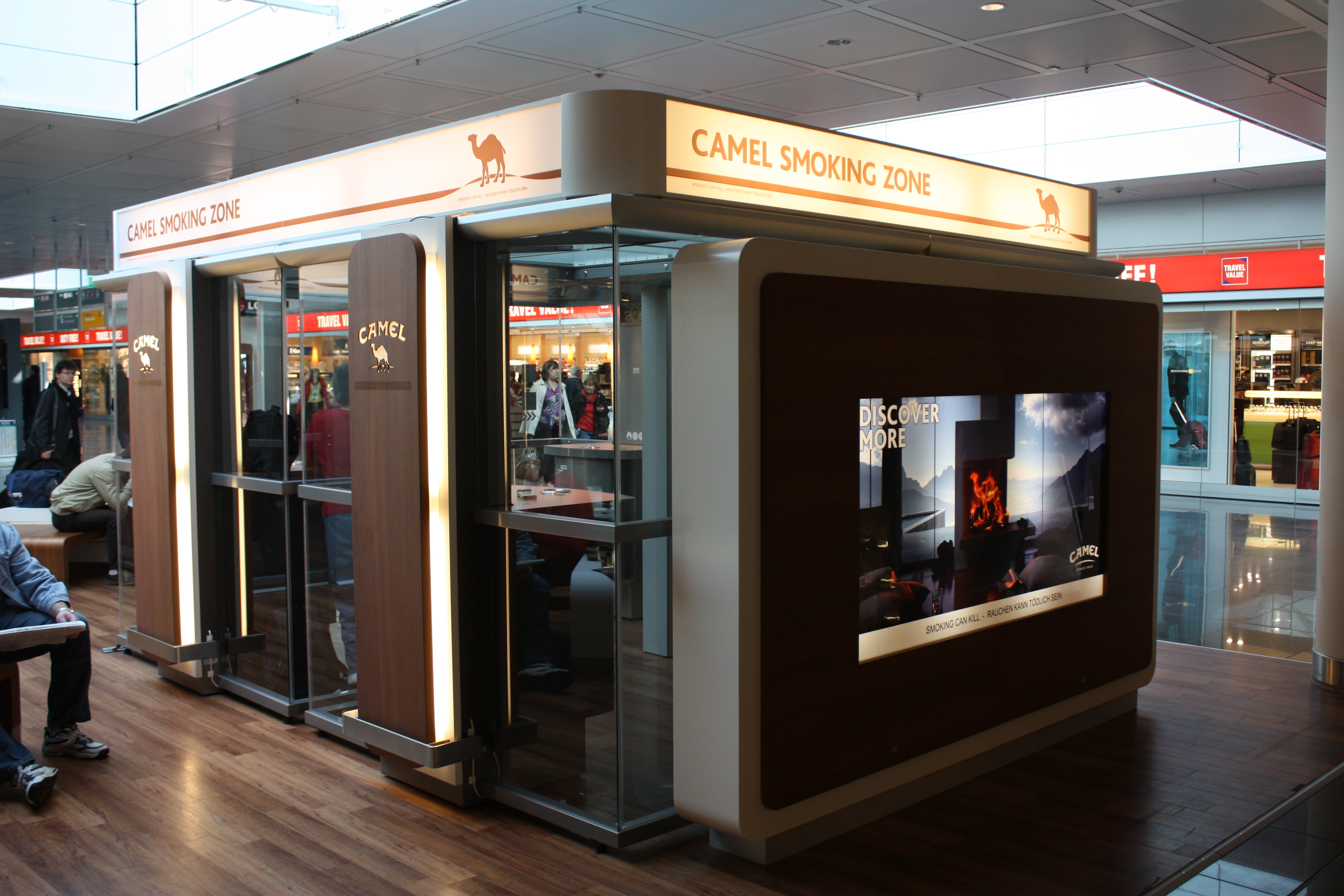
A smoking room at Munich Airport in 2009

Bavaria's Health Protection Act (GSG) is one of the strictest in Germany. A general ban applies in all enclosed public spaces, restaurants, cultural and leisure facilities.

- General rule: Complete ban in all listed categories.
- Exceptions:
  - Hospitals and prisons: Limited exceptions for patients in palliative care or psychiatric side rooms. The director of a correctional facility may permit smoking in common areas.
  - Cultural institutions: Smoking may be permitted if it is part of an artistic performance.
  - Police and prosecution offices: May be permitted in designated areas during interrogations if the person being interrogated is a smoker and has approval.

=== Berlin ===
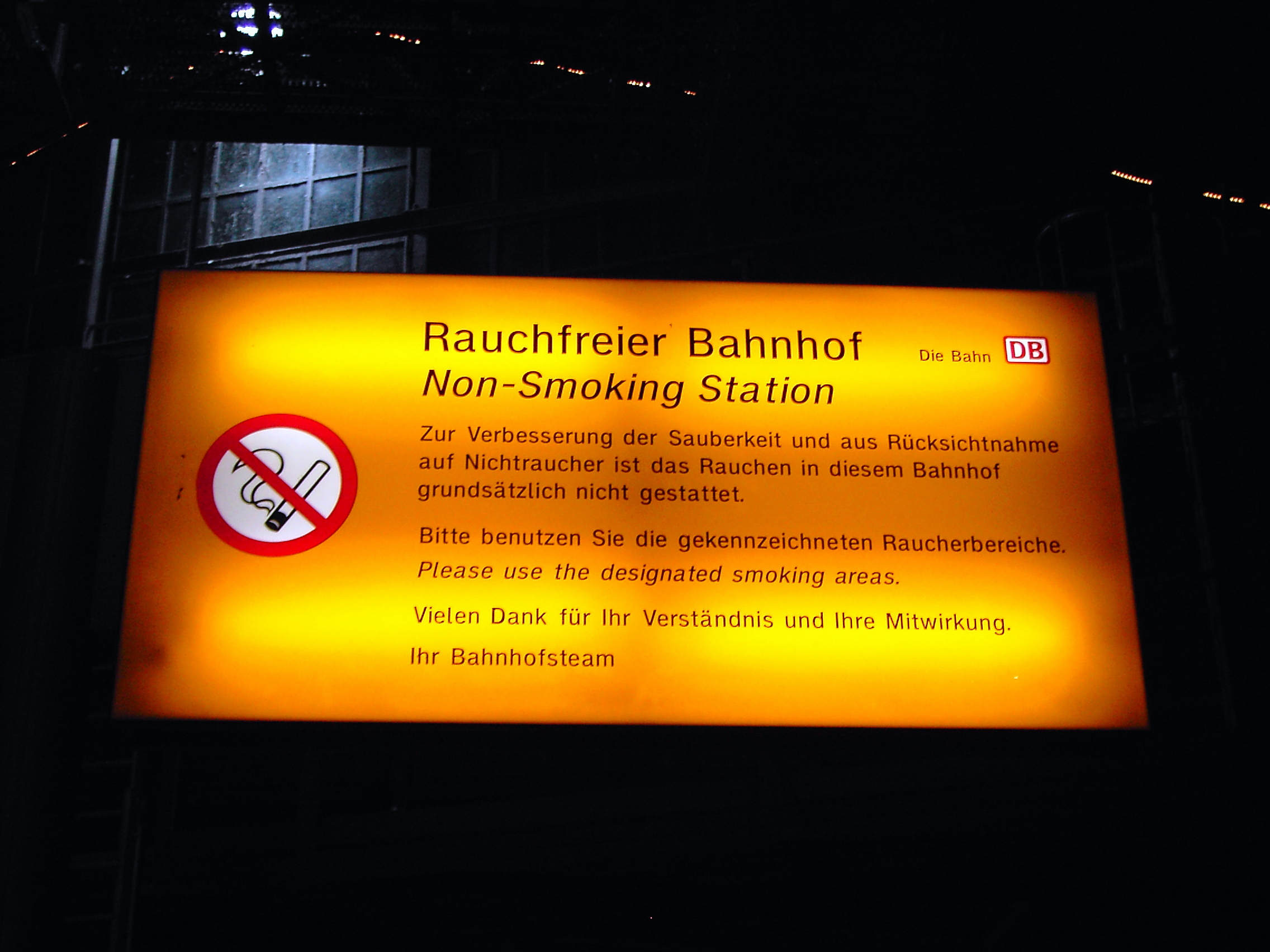
Smoking ban notification at Berlin Friedrichstraße railway station

- Restaurants, bars and discothèques: Ban with exceptions. Smoking is permitted in:
  - Truly separate, enclosed smoking rooms.
  - Hookah bars clearly designated as such.
  - Single-room pubs smaller than 75 m^{2} that serve no or only cold food, are marked as a smoking pub, and restrict access to adults over 18.
  - Private "club" pubs (Vereinsgaststätten) run as smoking bars.
  - In all cases where exceptions apply (except separate rooms in regular restaurants), minors under 18 are not permitted on the premises.
- Government institutions and prisons: Ban with exceptions. Exceptions apply in designated rooms in correctional facilities, police stations (interrogation rooms), and court buildings (waiting areas).
- Hospitals and nursing homes: Ban with exceptions. Exceptions for designated rooms in psychiatric or rehabilitation centers, and for therapeutic reasons in palliative care.
- Cultural institutions: Ban, but an exception is made for smoking as part of an artistic performance.
- Day care, schools, gyms and public transport: Complete ban.

=== Brandenburg ===
- Restaurants, bars and discothèques: Ban with exceptions. Smoking is permitted in:
  - A separated and ventilated smoking room.
  - Premises smaller than 75 m^{2} that serve no or only cold food.
  - In discothèques, a separate smoking room with no dance floor is allowed.
  - Minors under 18 are not permitted in any of these smoking areas.
- Prisons: Ban with exceptions. Permitted in prison cells with the permission of the administration.
- Hospitals and nursing homes: Ban with exceptions. Permitted for therapeutic reasons in designated areas of health facilities (especially psychiatry and palliative care) and in private rooms of care facilities.
- Government, day care, schools, gyms, cultural institutions and public transport: Complete ban.

=== Bremen ===
- Restaurants, bars and discothèques: Ban with exceptions. Smoking is permitted in:
  - Separated smoking rooms. In discothèques, this room may not be connected to the dance floor.
  - Single-room pubs smaller than 75 m^{2} that serve no or only cold food, restrict access to adults over 18, and are clearly marked as a smoking pub.
- Prisons: Ban with exceptions. Permitted in solitary cells or in enclosed smoking rooms with permission from the department chief.
- Hospitals: Ban with exceptions. Permitted for patients in palliative care, psychiatric treatment, or under court-ordered placement, or if required to achieve a therapy goal.
- Government, day care, schools, gyms, cultural institutions and public transport: Complete ban.

=== Hamburg ===
- Restaurants, bars and discothèques: Ban with exceptions. Smoking is permitted in:
  - Separated and ventilated smoking rooms, with no entry for minors under 18.
  - Bars or clubs smaller than 75 m^{2} that do not serve prepared food and have a liquor license, with no entry for minors under 18.
- Government institutions: Ban with an exception for police custody rooms with case-by-case permission from the department chief.
- Prisons: Ban with an exception for habitation rooms if all residents consent and the chief of the establishment approves.
- Hospitals: Ban with exceptions for mandatory conceptual or therapeutic reasons.
- Day care, schools, gyms, cultural institutions and public transport: Complete ban.

=== Hesse ===
Buildings of the Hessischer Rundfunk may establish separated smoking rooms.

- Restaurants, bars and casinos: Ban with exceptions. Smoking is permitted in:
  - Completely separated smoking rooms.
  - Premises smaller than 75 m^{2} with only one room, serving no or only cold food.
  - Private events with invited guests only.
  - Temporary party tents (max 21 days at one location).
  - Casinos (ban lifted by court ruling).
- Government institutions: Ban with an exception for completely separated smoking rooms, and for police holding cells with permission from the department chief.
- Hospitals and nursing homes: Ban with exceptions. Exceptions are made for patients if smoking is part of a medical treatment, and for rooms used for residents' personal use.
- Prisons, day care, schools, gyms, cultural institutions, discothèques and public transport: Complete ban.

=== Lower Saxony ===
Municipalities may ban smoking on public playgrounds.

- General rule for exceptions: In many public buildings (government, higher education, cultural institutions, restaurants), smoking is permitted in completely separated, marked smoking rooms or in single-room establishments smaller than 75 m^{2} serving only cold food.
- Prisons: Ban does not apply to detention and interrogation rooms.
- Hospitals: Ban does not apply to patient rooms for court-ordered placements, palliative care rooms, for therapeutic goals, or for patients not permitted to leave the facility.
- Day care, K-12 schools, gyms and public transport: Complete ban.

=== Mecklenburg-Vorpommern ===
Separated smoking areas may be established in most public buildings.

- General rule for exceptions: In many public buildings (government, higher education, gyms, cultural institutions, restaurants, discothèques), smoking is permitted in completely separated, marked smoking rooms or in single-room establishments smaller than 75 m^{2} serving only cold food.
- Prisons and mental hospitals: Ban with an exception for prisoner cells and patient rooms.
- Hospitals and care facilities: Ban with an exception for rooms for personal use if permitted by the attending physician.
- Day care and K-12 schools: Complete ban.

=== North Rhine-Westphalia ===
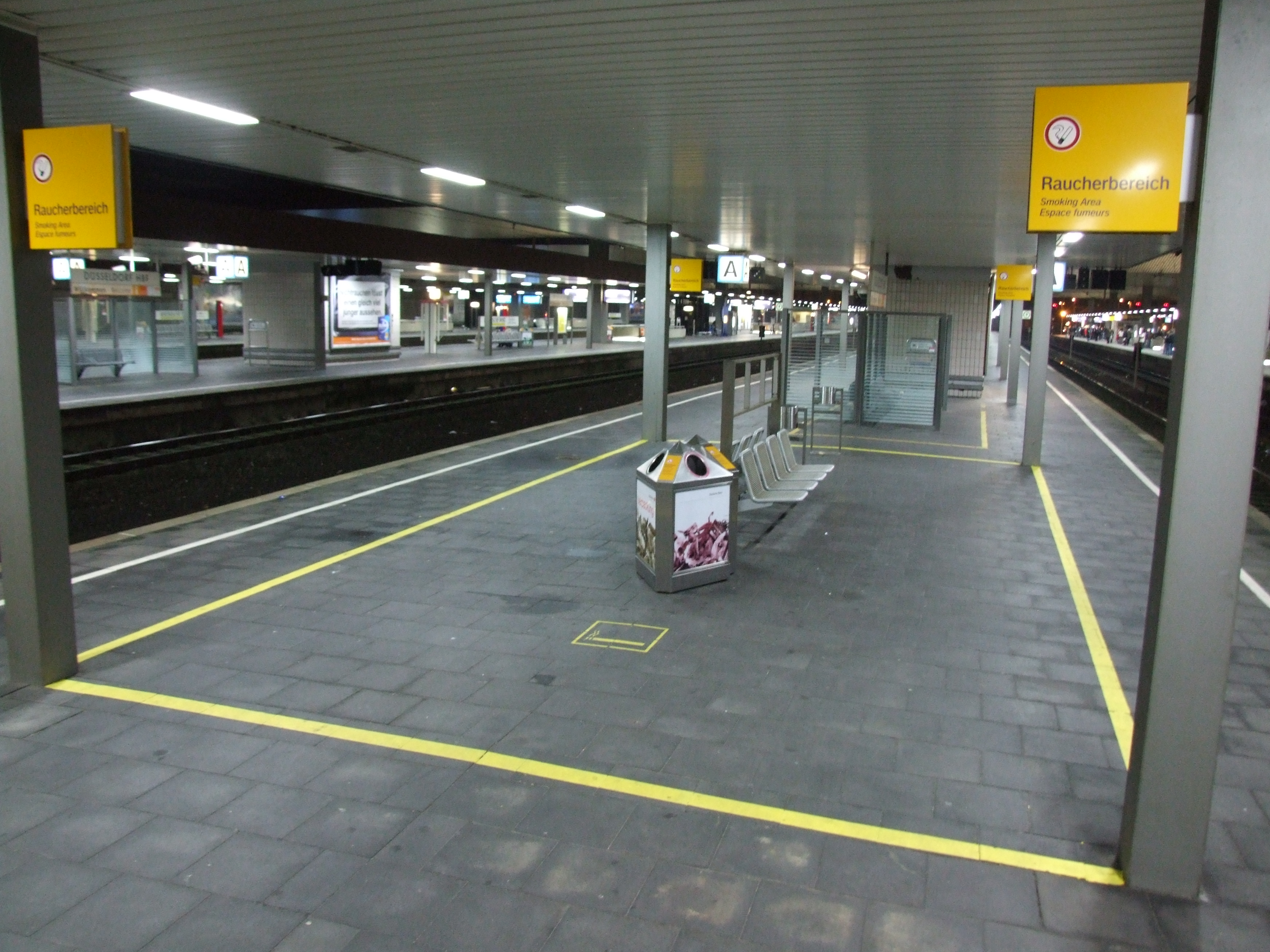
Designated smoking zone at Düsseldorf central railway station

NRW has one of the strictest smoking bans nationwide.

- General rule: A complete ban applies in almost all enclosed public spaces, including government institutions, schools, cultural institutions, restaurants, bars, and discothèques.
- Exceptions:
  - Prisons: Permitted in prisoner cells as long as all occupants are smokers.
  - Hospitals and nursing homes: Smoking rooms are permitted in inpatient nursing facilities. The ban does not apply to patients in palliative or psychiatric treatment, or for therapeutic reasons.

=== Rhineland-Palatinate ===
- Restaurants, bars and discothèques: Ban with exceptions. Smoking is permitted in:
  - Single-room pubs smaller than 75 m^{2} serving no or only cold food, clearly marked as smoking establishments.
  - Separated rooms. In discothèques, the smoking room must be separate from the dance floor.
  - Temporary festival tents (max 21 days at one location).
- Prisons: Ban with an exception for holding cells if all residents give permission, and in separated smoking rooms.
- Hospitals and nursing homes: General ban, but does not apply to rooms for personal use. Specific exceptions exist for psychiatric, palliative, or therapeutic reasons, and for residents of elderly/care homes if a separate smoking room is provided.
- Day care: Ban with an exception for individual cases where the head of the facility may permit it.
- Cultural institutions: Ban with an exception for artistic performances.
- Government institutions, schools, gym and public transport: Complete ban.

=== Saarland ===
- Government institutions: Ban with an exception for separated and clearly highlighted smoking facilities.
- Prisons and hospitals: Ban does not apply in rooms ceded for personal use in prisons, forensic commitment facilities, hospices, and palliative care facilities.
- Day care, schools, gyms, cultural institutions, discothèques, restaurants and public transport: Complete ban.

=== Saxony ===
- Restaurants, bars, clubs and gambling premises: Ban with exceptions. Smoking is permitted in:
  - Separated rooms marked for smoking, with access restricted to adults over 18.
  - Single-room bars or gambling premises smaller than 75 m^{2}, marked for smoking, with access restricted to adults over 18.
  - During private, rented events.
- Government institutions, prisons and hospitals: Ban with exceptions. Separated smoking rooms are permitted in many cases, including for therapeutic reasons in hospitals, in correctional facilities, and in designated police/prosecutor rooms during interrogations.
- Day care, schools, gyms, cultural institutions and public transport: Complete ban.

=== Saxony-Anhalt ===
- General rule for exceptions: Smoking rooms can be permitted in many public spaces, including government buildings, higher education facilities, hotels, shopping malls, and restaurants.
  - Restaurants: Owner-operated, single-room restaurants smaller than 75 m^{2} serving only cold food may permit smoking if minors are not allowed.
  - Discothèques: Smoking rooms are allowed if they are not directly connected to the dance floor and minors are not permitted.
- Prisons and hospitals: Ban does not apply to rooms for personal use, in correctional facilities, or in forensic commitment facilities.
- Day care, K-12 schools, gyms, cultural institutions, public transport: Complete ban.

=== Schleswig-Holstein ===
- Restaurants, bars and discothèques: Ban with exceptions. Smoking is permitted in:
  - Enclosed, separated rooms (including for private events), with no entry for minors.
  - Owner-operated, single-room restaurants smaller than 75 m^{2} serving only cold food, if minors are not permitted.
- Prisons and hospitals: Ban does not apply to rooms for personal use. Exemptions can be granted by facility management for medical or therapeutic reasons. Also exempt are temporary tents for events.
- Government institutions, day care, schools, gyms, cultural institutions and public transport: Complete ban.

=== Thuringia ===
- Government, restaurants, bars and discothèques: Ban with exceptions. Smoking is permitted in:
  - Structurally separated smoking rooms.
  - Single-room pubs smaller than 75 m^{2} serving only cold food, restricting access to adults over 18, and clearly marked as a smoking pub.
- Prisons and hospitals: Ban does not apply to gambling premises, rooms for personal use, or where facility management gives permission.
- Day care, schools, gyms, cultural institutions and public transport: Complete ban.

== See also ==
- Anti-tobacco movement in Nazi Germany
- European Tobacco Products Directive
- Reemtsma, the main tobacco company
