= Dirk Langerbein =

German footballer

Personal information
- Date of birth: 9 September 1971 (age 55)
- Place of birth: Lippetal, West Germany
- Height: 1.88 m (6 ft 2 in)
- Position: Goalkeeper

Team information
- Current team: Rot Weiss Ahlen (Goalkeeper coach)

Youth career
- 1977–1986: 1. SC Lippetal
- 1986–1990: Borussia Lippstadt

Senior career*
| Years | Team | Apps | (Gls) |
| 1990–1994 | Borussia Lippstadt | | |
| 1994–1995 | Amicitia Viernheim | | |
| 1995–1997 | Teutonia Lippstadt | | |
| 1997–1999 | FC Gütersloh | 17 | (0) |
| 1999–2002 | LR Ahlen | 59 | (0) |
| 2002–2004 | MSV Duisburg | 63 | (0) |
| 2005 | 1. FC Nürnberg | 3 | (0) |
| 2005–2006 | Rot-Weiss Essen | 9 | (0) |
| 2007–2009 | Rot Weiss Ahlen | 23 | (0) |
| Total | | 174 | (0) |
- * Club domestic league appearances and goals

Dirk Langerbein (born 9 September 1971, in Lippetal) is a German former professional footballer who played as goalkeeper.

During his career, he mostly played in the 2. Bundesliga, in which he made a total of 156 appearances playing for FC Gütersloh, LR Ahlen, MSV Duisburg and Rot Weiss Ahlen. In the 2004–05 season, he also made three Bundesliga appearances with 1. FC Nürnberg. He finished his career with Rot Weiss Ahlen in 2009, after which he started working as the club's goalkeeping coach.
