= Blend (cigarette) =

Swedish cigarette brand

- An old Finnish pack of Blend cigarettes, with a Finnish text warning at the bottom of the pack.
- Product type: Cigarette
- Produced by: Swedish Match AB
- Country: Sweden
- Introduced: 1971; 55 years ago
- Markets: See Markets

Blend is a Swedish brand of cigarettes. It was originally owned and manufactured by Svenska Tobaks AB and later Swedish Match AB, until Swedish Match AB sold the brand to Austria Tabak along with the rest of its cigarette production.

== History ==
Blend was introduced in 1971 by Swenska Tobaks AB as a low-tar cigarette brand. The first variant, which came to be known as Yellow Blend after the color of the package, had 12 milligrams of tar. The following year, a menthol flavored variant was launched called Blend Blue.

The Vita blend was introduced with a tar content of 8 mg in 1977, and then the variants Ultra (5 mg, launched in 1979) and Ultima (2 mg, launched in 1981). Although the company pushed towards lower tar content in its brands, it hasn't been shown that lower tar content is any less harmful.

== Markets ==
The brand's focal market is Sweden, but its products are also available in Finland, Spain and Russia.

== See also ==
- Tobacco smoking
