= Tigrão =

Brazilian footballer

Personal information
- Full name: Leandro Antonio da Silva
- Date of birth: July 6, 1982 (age 44)
- Place of birth: Rio de Janeiro, Brazil
- Height: 1.82 m (6 ft 0 in)
- Position: Midfielder

Senior career*
Years	Team	Apps	(Gls)
2002–2004	América		
2004–2005	1. FC Nürnberg	3	(0)
2005	Prudentópolis		
2006	Odd Grenland		
2006–2007	Americano		
2007	Olimpia		
2008	Tiburones Rojos de Veracruz		
2008	Hermann Aichinger		
2009	Cascavel		
2009–2010	Serra		
2011	Ferroviário		
- * Club domestic league appearances and goals

Leandro Antonio da Silva known as Tigrão (born July 6, 1982, in Rio de Janeiro) is a Brazilian former professional footballer who played as a midfielder. He spent one season in the Bundesliga with 1. FC Nürnberg.
