= Rainbow Six =

Rainbow Six may refer to:

- Rainbow Six (novel), a 1998 novel by Tom Clancy
  - John Clark (Ryanverse character), the eponymously code-named commander featured in the novel
- Tom Clancy's Rainbow Six, a video game franchise published by Ubisoft
  - Tom Clancy's Rainbow Six (video game), a tactical shooter video game
- "Rainbow Six", a song from JPEGMafia's album Veteran
- Rainbow crossings in Taipei
