= Lippetal =

- Municipality
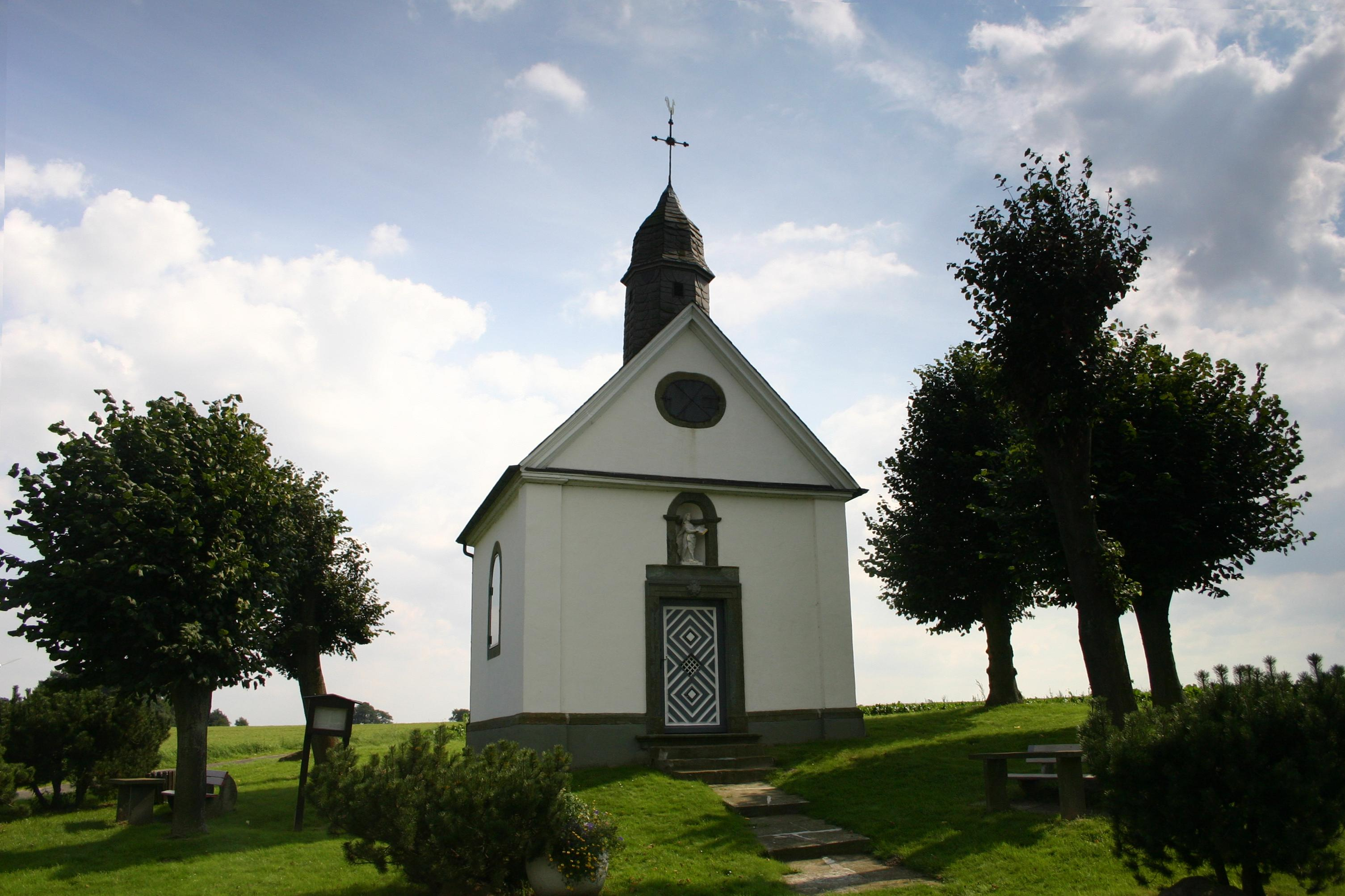
- St. Anna chapel in Nordwald

- Coat of arms

- Location of Lippetal within Soest district
- Interactive map of Lippetal
- Location within Germany Location within North Rhine-Westphalia
- Coordinates: 51°39′N 08°05′E
- Country: Germany
- State: North Rhine-Westphalia
- Admin. region: Arnsberg
- District: Soest

Government
  - Mayor (2020–25): Matthias Lürbke (CDU)
  - Governing parties: CDU

Area
  - Total: 126.61 km^{2} (48.88 sq mi)
- Elevation: 69–155 m (226–509 ft)

Population (2025-12-31)
  - Total: 11,795
  - Density: 93.160/km^{2} (241.28/sq mi)
- Time zone: UTC+01:00 (CET)
  - Summer (DST): UTC+02:00 (CEST)
- Postal codes: 59510
- Dialling codes: 02923 (Herzfeld); 02527 (Lippborg)
- Vehicle registration: SO
- Website: www.lippetal.de

Lippetal (German pronunciation: [ˈlɪpəˌtaːl], lit. 'Lippe Valley') is a municipality in the district of Soest, in North Rhine-Westphalia, Germany.

== Geography ==
Lippetal is located north and south of the river Lippe between the cities of Lippstadt (15 km (9.3 mi)) and Hamm (10 km (6.2 mi)). Lippetal is situated at the northern boundary of the Soester Börde, south of the river Lippe and the southern Münsterland in north of the river. The river Lippe flows from east to the west through the municipality.

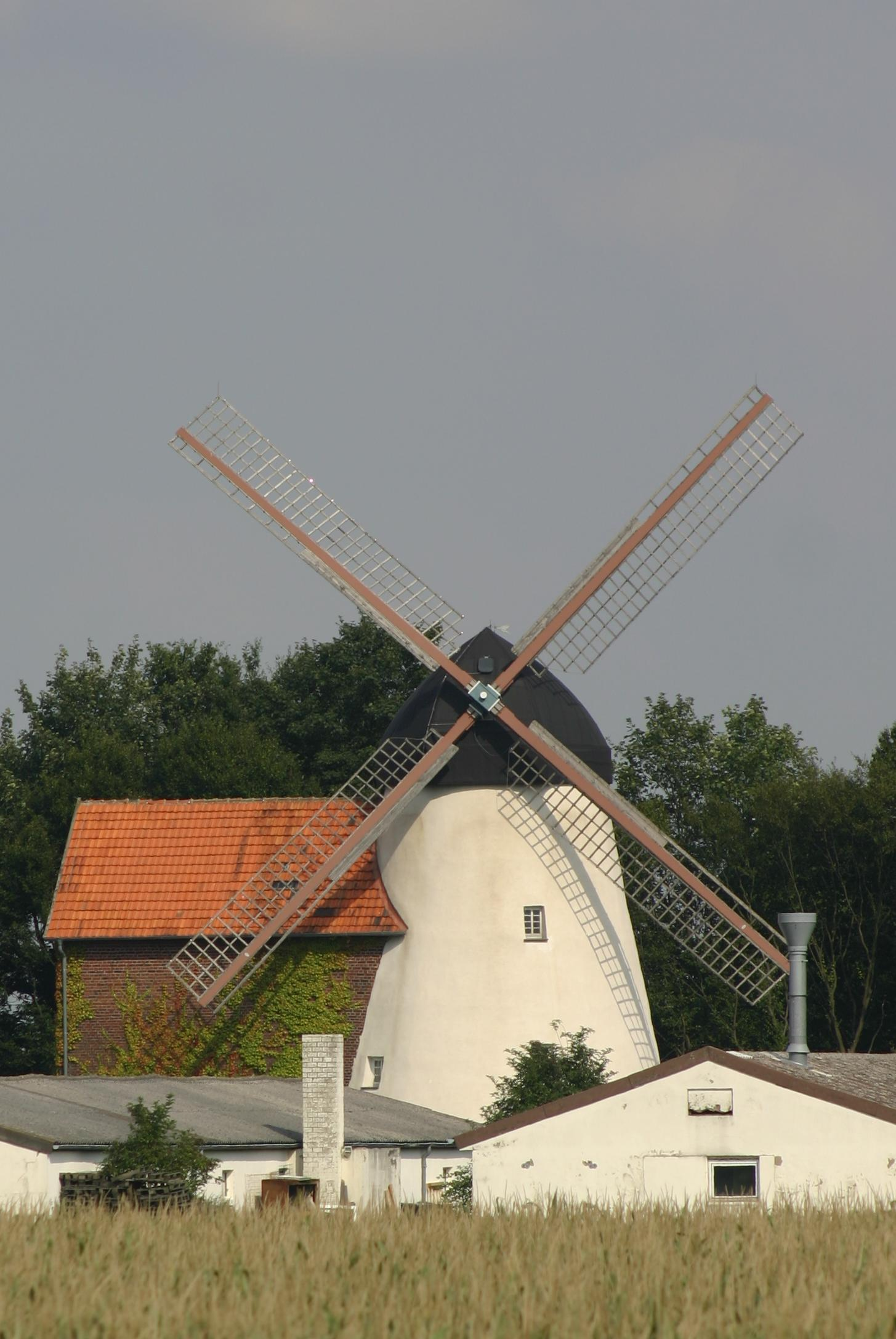
Windmill

== Division of the municipality ==
There are eleven villages in Lippetal:

- Brockhausen
- Heintrop-Büninghausen
- Herzfeld
- Hultrop
- Hovestadt
- Krewinkel-Wiltrop
- Lippborg
- Niederbauer
- Nordwald
- Oestinghausen
- Schoneberg

=== Neighbouring Places ===
- Ahlen
- Bad Sassendorf
- Beckum
- Hamm
- Lippstadt
- Soest
- Wadersloh

== History ==
The municipality Lippetal was created by administrative reorganization in 1969. Lippetal was made with eleven villages from three different districts.

The villages are mostly old Saxon settlements. The villages Oestinghausen and Lippborg were first mentioned in 1189, Hovestadt in 1213, and the place of pilgrimage Herzfeld in a document in 786.

== Population ==
Historical population

| Year | Pop. | ±% p.a. |
|---|---|---|
| 1965 | 8,866 | — |
| 1970 | 9,342 | +1.05% |
| 1975 | 10,123 | +1.62% |
| 1980 | 10,387 | +0.52% |
| 1985 | 10,498 | +0.21% |
| 1990 | 11,155 | +1.22% |
| 1995 | 12,081 | +1.61% |

| Year | Pop. | ±% p.a. |
|---|---|---|
| 2000 | 12,529 | +0.73% |
| 2005 | 12,593 | +0.10% |
| 2010 | 12,289 | −0.49% |
| 2015 | 12,027 | −0.43% |
| 2020 | 11,949 | −0.13% |
| 2025 | 11,795 | −0.26% |

Source: Landesdatabank Nordrhein-Westfalen

== Personalities ==
- William Finnemann (1882-1942), priest of the Society of the Divine Word, auxiliary bishop of Manila and apostolic vicar of Calapan,
- Leon (* 1969 as Jürgen Göbel ) German percussionist
- Dirk Langerbein (* 1971) former football goalkeeper, now goalkeeper coach
