= Hans Domizlaff =

German writer

- Born: 9 May 1892; Frankfurt, Germany
- Died: 5 September 1971 (aged 79); Hamburg, Germany
- Occupation: Writer

Hans Domizlaff (9 May 1892 – 5 September 1971) was a German writer and illustrator famous for his work on brands. His work was part of the literature event in the art competition at the 1936 Summer Olympics.

Domizlaff worked as a painter, stage designer, writer, advertising consultant and creator of well-known brands and branded articles in Leipzig, Berlin and Hamburg. With his book publications Typische Denkfehler der Reklamekritik (1929) and Die Gewinnung des öffentlichen Vertrauens. Ein Lehrbuch der Markentechnik (transcript 1937, 1st edition 1939, 2nd edition revised and supplemented by Hans Domizlaff 1951, 7th edition August 2005), he became the founder of brand technology.

== Early life ==
Hans Domizlaff was the son of Georg Domizlaff (1854-1937), president of the Oberpostdirektion Leipzig, and Anna Catharina Domizlaff née Boeter (1866-1944). He had two brothers, including Helmuth Domizlaff (1902-1983), antiquarian bookseller in Munich, and three sisters, including Hildegard Domizlaff (1898-1987), sculptor.

Hans Domizlaff first made a name for himself in Leipzig as a painter during his school years, encouraged by Fedor Flinzer and supported by Max Klinger. He stayed in Paris and London several times between 1912 and 1914. In the spring of 1914, he traveled to Morocco via Spain and back to Germany in July via Barcelona and Venice.

Back in Leipzig, Domizlaff initially began training as an airplane pilot in September 1914. A crash, which he survived with serious injuries, prevented him from going into World War I as an aviator. He used the time as a convalescent to study at the University of Leipzig. From March 1916 until the end of the war, he was a soldier in France. He was trained there as an aerial photographer.

== Artistic work in advertising ==
After World War I, he opened a studio as a painter in Leipzig's Thomaskirchhof. Among other things, he designed trade fair booths and advertising posters, but mainly stage sets at the Städtisches Theater and the Leipzig Volkstheater. As an artistic advisor to the printing company and packaging manufacturer Wezel & Naumann, he began to explore the still young field of advertising and its means of effect.

Domizlaff was the owner of the Yawl Dirk II and then the Yawl Dirk III in the interwar years, with which he sailed mainly the Baltic Sea, but also the North Sea. He published his experiences in two books in 1930 and 1934. Among others, Max Schmeling and Vice Admiral Alfred Begas sailed with him in 1929, and he also participated in regattas such as the North Sea Week with the Dirk III.

Domizlaff worked on the Reemtsma logo developed in 1920.

According to his autobiography, there was also a meeting in 1936 with Propaganda Minister Joseph Goebbels, who claimed to be an expert on Domizlaff's writings. He took part as a poet in the art competitions of the 1936 Olympic Games. Otherwise, Domizlaff kept his distance from National Socialism and at the end of 1940 withdrew more and more to his heath farm, which he had acquired in 1927, and from mid-1943 was elected chairman of the Lüneburg Heath Nature Reserve Association. In 1941, he initially ended his cooperation with Siemens. With the support of the Gauleiter of East Hanover Otto Telschow, who became the official patron of the nature reserve park, he succeeded in preserving the structure and expansion of the park against claims by the Wehrmacht.

Immediately after the end of the war, he was interrogated several times by the British military authorities and interned for six months. His property in Hamburg and Egestorf was confiscated and not released until 1947. He gradually resumed work for Siemens and Reemtsma.

Until the mid-1960s, Domizlaff worked as a consultant for Reemtsma, Siemens and Deutsche Grammophon, after which he withdrew from active business consulting.

== Family life ==
In his first marriage Hans Domizlaff was married since 1919 to Natalie, née Domizlaff (1892-1960), in 1950 he married Dora, née Kreuzberger (b. 1921), with whom he had four children: Svante (b. 1950), Irina (b. 1951), Georg C. (b. 1953), and Andrea (b. 1956).
