= Oestinghausen =

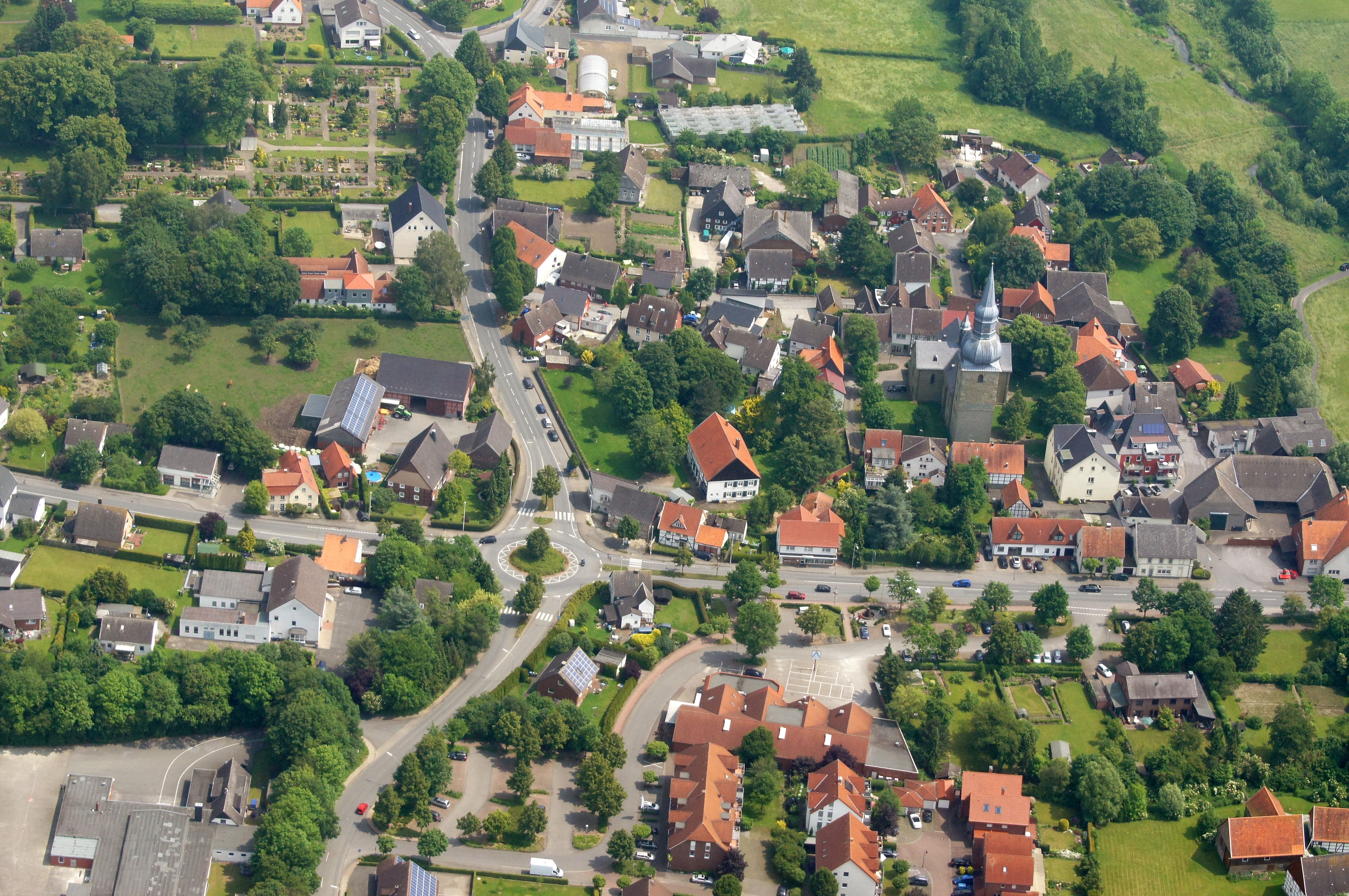

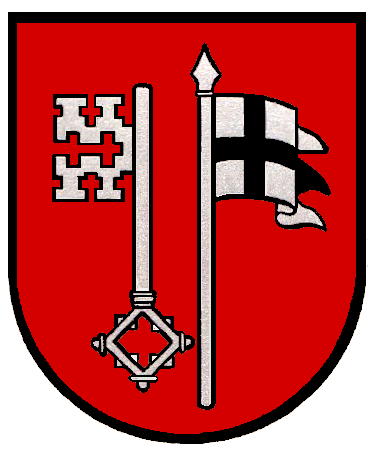
- Coat of arms

- Location within Germany
- Coordinates: 51°38′09″N 8°06′09″E

Oestinghausen is a village in the municipality of Lippetal in North Rhine-Westphalia, Germany, with a population of 1,944 (as of 30 June 2012).

Oestinghausen has a primary school the St. Stephanus-Schule and a kindergarten. The sports club Schwarz-Gelb Oestinghausen, the Carnival-Club and the "Schuetzenverein" Sankt Hubertus regularly use the Community Hall and the sports field. Other local associations are the Oestinghausen marching band, the Scouts and a volunteer fire department.

== Geography ==
Oestinghausen is located on the Bundesstraße 475 (Federal Road) about seven kilometers north of the city of Soest on the creeks Ahse and Rosenaue, which meet south of the village.51°38′09″N 08°06′09″E.

== Economy ==
The economic centre is in the area around the old railway station. Here there are a supermarket, a hairdresser, bank, pharmacy, and stationery and photo-shop with post office. Several companies are located in an industrial estate. There is a market for local produce on Wednesdays and Sundays.

== History ==
It is presumed that Oestinghausen was an old Saxon settlement; it was first mentioned in a document in 1189. After the Soest Feud, a local conflict which ended with the separation of Soest from the archbishops of Cologne in 1449, Oestinghausen remained under the control of Cologne. The "Amt Oestinghausen" had its own independent jurisdiction. In 1802, the temporal estates of the archbishops of Cologne were reorganized and Oestinghausen became part of Hesse.

In 1808, the population of Oestinghausen was 552, and in 1816, Oestinghausen became part of Prussia. Thus Oestinghausen lost its own jurisdiction and became part of the district of Soest. The "Amt Oestinghausen" consisted of the villages of Bettinghausen, Eickelborn, Heintrop-Bünninghausen, Hovestadt, Hultrop, Krewinkel-Wiltrop, Lohe, Niederbauer, Nordwald, Oestinghausen, Ostinghausen and Schoneberg.

In 1898, a narrow-gauge (1 metre gauge) railway, later known as Pengel Anton (a Westphalian expression for a steam railway), was built to serve the rural area. In Oestinghausen a four-track switchyard and station were constructed, as the main rail line from Hamm to Soest connects here with the branch line to the village of Hovestadt. The last train ran on 5 October 1952.

In the local government reorganisation of 1969, the village of Oestinghausen was incorporated into the municipality of Lippetal. Its population in the 19th and 20th centuries did not alter significantly; today the population is over 2,000, compared to the prewar (1939) figure of 602.

=== Buildings ===
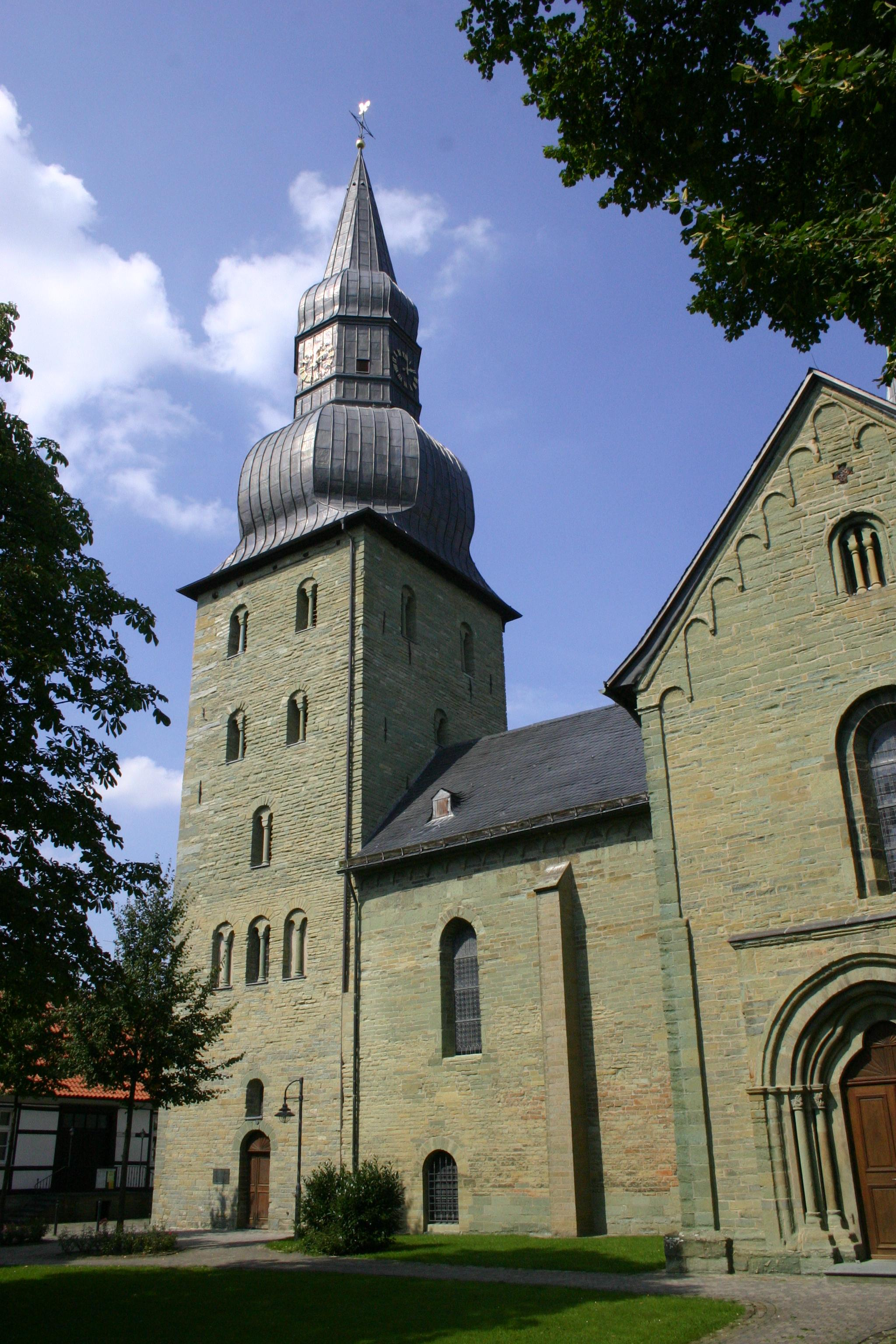
Saint Stefanus parish church

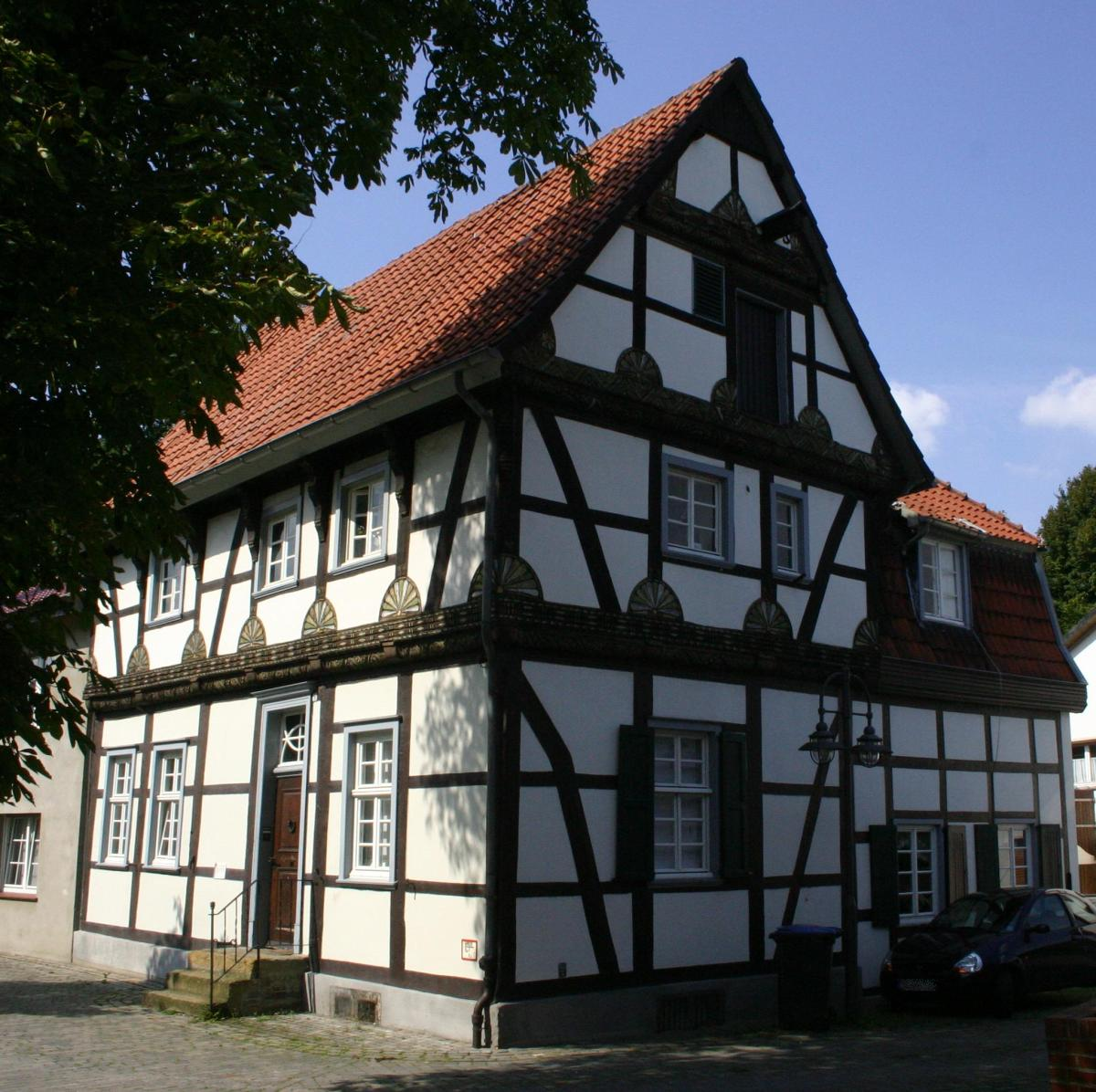
Chur Cöllnisches Amtshaus

The most important building in Oestinghausen is the romanesque church of St Stephanus in the old centre of the village. It has been the parish church for the villages of Oestinghausen, Krewinkel, Wiltrop and Niederbauer.

The church was built c. 1000 as a parish church for the local farm (erzbischöflichen Oberhof). In 1186, Phillip von Heinzberg, bishop of Cologne, called it the "Oberhof". The transept and vaulted ceiling were added in the thirteenth century and the top of the steeple was erected in 1715]. The altar was built in the Baroque style c. 1685 and the side altars built in the late Rococo style c. 1775. The church was restored between 1975 and 1980.

The church is surrounded by several half-timbered houses. The court clerk worked and lived in the Renaissance-style half-timbered house called the "Chur Cöllnisches Amtshaus".

An important event in Oestinghausen is the annual Schützenfest.
