= Reemtsma =

Tobacco company

Reemtsma Cigarettenfabriken GmbH
- Type: GmbH
- Industry: Tobacco
- Predecessor: Badische Tabakmanufaktur Roth-Händle; Dresdner Emballagenfabrik; Zigarettenfabrik Manoli
- Founded: 1910; 116 years ago in Erfurt, German Empire
- Founder: Bernhard Reemtsma
- Headquarters: Hamburg, Germany
- Parent: Imperial Brands
- Website: reemtsma.com

Reemtsma Cigarettenfabriken GmbH is one of the largest tobacco and cigarette manufacturing companies in Europe and a subsidiary of Imperial Brands. The company’s headquarters are in Hamburg, Germany.

== History ==
Reemtsma was founded in 1910 in Erfurt, Germany. In 1918, production was automated. During the 1920s, many German cigarette firms went bankrupt, and the market was increasingly dominated by a few large, highly automated manufacturers, including Reemtsma.

By 1920, Reemtsma had attracted the talents of tobacco expert David Schnur, who became a shareholder and oversaw blending and sourcing.

In 1921, the trademark "R6" was introduced to the market by Hans Domizlaff. In 1923, production was moved to Altona, now part of the city of Hamburg, where Reemtsma's main headquarters remain. In 1930, Reemtsma acquired the Berlin-based Problem Cigarettes.

In July 1932, Philipp Fürchtegott Reemtsma, head of the company, met with Adolf Hitler, Rudolf Hess, and Max Amann. Reemtsma's advertisements ran in the publications of other political factions, but had been banned from Nazi party publications. However, the Nazi publications were unprofitable, and the party needed funds for election campaigning. Hitler scolded Reemtsma for having Jewish partners and managers, but they agreed to an initial deal of half a million marks for advertising.

During the Third Reich, the company prospered despite the Nazis' official anti-tobacco policy. Shortly after the Nazis took power in 1933, Philipp Reemtsma asked Hermann Göring, then the highest official in Prussia, to address a court case and SA attacks against the company. In early 1934, Göring dismissed the court case in exchange for three million marks; Reemtsma subsequently paid him a million marks annually, in addition to substantial donations to the party. By July 1934, the Night of the Long Knives had removed the threat of the SA. Reemtsma's Jewish partners, notably David Schnur, emigrated, along with many Jewish employees, with assistance from Reemtsma.

In 1937, the company merged with "Haus Neuerburg" and achieved a 65% market share. Between 1933 and 1939, the firm's profits increased tenfold, reaching 114 million reichsmarks. In 1939, Philipp F. Reemtsma was appointed leader of the Fachuntergruppe Zigarettenindustrie, a part of the National Socialist economy, and was recognized by Göring as a Wehrwirtschaftsführer. Cigarettes were distributed free to soldiers, including minors, as part of their pay, and the market continued to expand rapidly.

During the war, forced labor was used by Reemtsma, with prison camps established at some locations. Reemtsma also used forced labor, including child labor, to harvest tobacco in the Crimea, with the local population receiving bread and flour in exchange for their work.

By 1941, tobacco taxes contributed about one-twelfth of state income, and anti-smoking efforts were being discouraged. In 1942, a tobacco shortage led to the shutdown of two-thirds of all German tobacco factories, with some converted into armaments factories. Tobacco was placed on ration, slowing the rapid rise in consumption. Reemtsma remained profitable.

Reemtsma's financial support of the Nazis was unmatched among German companies. The Sturmabteilung and other party organizations received six-figure sums, and the Hitler Youth were gifted an aircraft. After the war, Philipp Reemtsma was charged with having paid 12.3 million reichsmarks to Göring. No legal conviction followed, and he was released after twenty months. In 1948, he was deemed denazified and resumed running the business, reinstating or compensating his partners who had fled.

In 1980, Philipp Reemtsma's only surviving son, upon reaching adulthood after his father's death, declined to take over the company and sold his shares. He later privately undertook to compensate surviving Crimeans for their unpaid labor under his father.

The German coffee-producing company Tchibo subsequently acquired the majority of Reemtsma. In 2002, the shares were sold to Imperial Tobacco, then the world’s fourth-largest tobacco company. It is now a subsidiary of the renamed Imperial Tobacco, Imperial Brands.

== Products ==
Today, Reemtsma sells cigarettes, loose tobacco, cigarillos, and other tobacco products. Although its products are predominantly distributed in Germany, some are available across Europe. Brands such as Gauloises are produced and distributed by Reemtsma in Germany but are managed by Imperial Tobacco in other regions.

Some of their most famous brands include

- Cabinet
- Davidoff
- Gauloises
- John Player Special (JPS)
- R1
- West

== See also ==
- Smoking in Germany
