= Ahse =

River in Germany

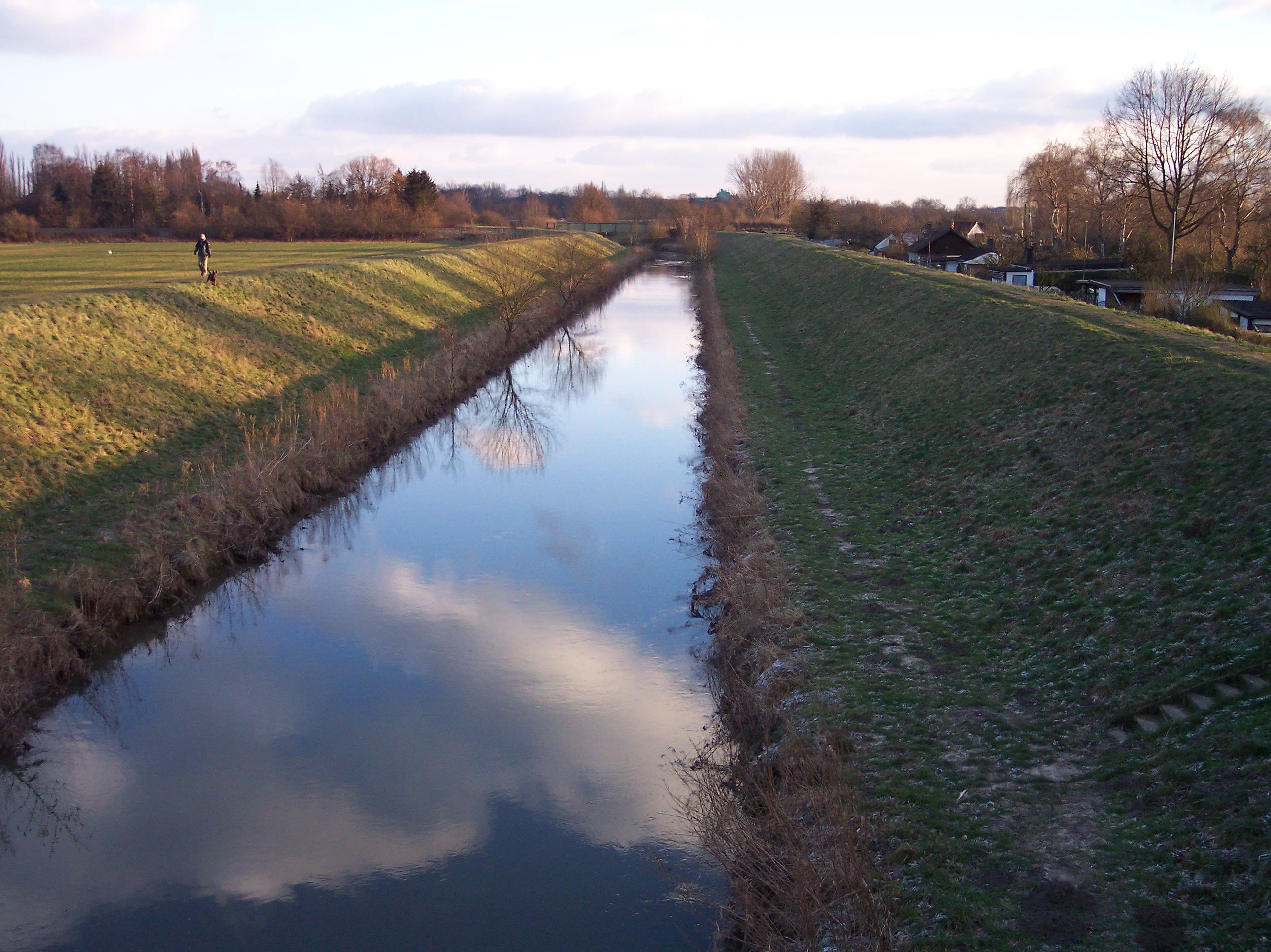

Location
- Country: Germany
- State: North Rhine-Westphalia

Physical characteristics
- Mouth
  - location: Lippe
  - coordinates: 51.6925°N 7.8356°E
- Length: 49.9 km (31.0 mi)
- Basin size: 441 km^{2} (170 sq mi)

Basin features
- Progression: Lippe→ Rhine→ North Sea

Ahse (German pronunciation: [ˈaːzə]) is a river of North Rhine-Westphalia, Germany. It flows into the Lippe near Hamm.

== See also ==
- List of rivers of North Rhine-Westphalia
