= Regionalverkehr Ruhr-Lippe =

German operator of public transport

The Regionalverkehr Ruhr-Lippe GmbH (RLG) is a publicly owned company in Westphalia that operates several railway lines as a rail infrastructure company, conducts freight transport as rail transport company, and is active in bus transport.

== History ==
Founded on January 24, 1979, in Soest, RLG is the successor to the AG Ruhr-Lippe-Eisenbahnen (RLE).

The shareholders of this transport company are the Westfälische Verkehrsgesellschaft mbH, which also manages the business, as well as the districts of Hochsauerlandkreis and Kreis Soest. Also involved are the cities of Arnsberg, Brilon, Erwitte, Hallenberg, Hamm, Marsberg, Medebach, Olsberg, Rüthen, Soest, Sundern, Warstein, Werl, and Winterberg, as well as the municipalities of Anröchte, Ense, Lippetal, Möhnesee, and Welver.

The following were consolidated in the company:

- The railway lines Hamm–Lippborg and Neheim-Hüsten–Arnsberg Süd of the RLE including the RLE bus operation
- The Neheim-Hüsten–Sundern railway line including bus operation
- The transport companies Kreis Brilon – Kleinbahn Steinhelle–Medebach – (bus operation only) and
- The partial operation Brilon–Warstein–Lippstadt of the bus service of the Westfälische Landes-Eisenbahn.

Operations management for rail freight traffic is located in Hamm and Hüsten Ost; for bus transport, the depots in Arnsberg, Brilon, Lippstadt, and Soest are responsible.

The operation of the remaining freight traffic of the Westfälische Landes-Eisenbahn in the urban area of Soest (taken over by the RLE from 1973) was relatively short-lived. It was carried out by Deutsche Bundesbahn from May 1987 and completely discontinued on December 31, 2001.

The rail network, serving only freight traffic, was 41.732 km long in 2012.

RLG operates two diesel locomotives, No. 54 (MaK G 1206, built in 2008) and No. 68 (KHD DG 1200 BBM, built in 1962).

In bus transport, a total of 217 vehicles (including 107 own buses) were used in 2012 on a route network of 3,993 km in length, which annually transported around 12.7 million passengers in the district of Soest and in the Hochsauerlandkreis.

Since 2012, RLG, together with Hochsauerlandkreis, Kreis Soest, and BRS Busverkehr Ruhr-Sieg GmbH, has been implementing the mobil4you project. Planned was, among other things, an electric bus as a neighborhood bus in Winterberg and Medebach, which was partially operated between 2013 and 2016 (now replaced in Winterberg by a community bus).

In 2022, RLG had 12.8 million passengers.

== Route ==
=== Express bus lines ===
Line	Route	Remarks	Frequency
S10	Neheim – Arnsberg	Operates via A46	Every 60 min
S20	Neheim – Neheim-Hüsten – Hachen – Stemel – Sundern	Runs parallel to R25	Every 60 min
S30	Brilon – Altenbüren – Olsberg – Bigge – Küstelberg – Medebach	Connection guarantee to S40 in Niedersfeld	Every 60 min
D30	Brilon – Altenbüren – Olsberg – Bigge – Küstelberg – Medebach	Runs parallel to S30 in peak hours	Occasionally during peak hours
S40	Schmallenberg – Nordenau – Winterberg – Niedersfeld	Connection guarantee to S30 in Niedersfeld	Every 60 min
S60	Lippstadt – Erwitte – Anröchte – Belecke – Warstein	Runs parallel to R61 until Erwitte	Every 60 min, Every 30 min during peak hours until Erwitte

=== Regional bus lines Soest ===
Line	Route	Remarks	Frequency Monday–Friday + Saturday morning	Frequency Saturday afternoon + Sunday
R36	Soest – Hovestadt – Herzfeld		Every 60 min	Irregular
R41	Hamm-Rhynern – Werl	Connection guarantee to R47 / C5	Every 60 min	Every 120 min
R47	Werl – Westönnen – Ostönnen	Continues as C5	Every 60 min	Every 120 min
R51	Soest – Echtrop (- Körbecke) – Belecke – Warstein	Not all trips operate via Körbecke	Every 60 min	Every 120 min
R54	Neheim – Niederense – Ostönnen	Connection in Ostönnen to C5 / R47	Every 60 min	Every 120 min

=== Citybus Arnsberg ===
Line	Route	Frequency
C1	Neheim, Bus Station – Hüsten – Niedereimer – Arnsberg, Neumarkt Continues as C3 Gierskämpen / Waldfriedhof	Every 30 min
C2	Neheim, Bus Station – Moosfelde	Every 30 min
C3	Arnsberg Gierskämpen / Waldfriedhof – Neumarkt Continues as C1 Neheim	Every 30 min
C4	Neheim, Johanneskirche – Bus Station – Rusch	Every 30 min
C5	Neheim, Bus Station – Bergheim – Bachum – Voßwinkel	Every 60 min
C6	Neheim, Bus Station – Hüsten – Herdringen – Hüstener Markt	Every 60 min
C7	Neheim, Bus Station – Rumbecker Holz – Neheim-Hüsten, Train Station	Irregular
C8	Neheim-Hüsten, Train Station – Holzen – Oelinghauser Heide	Every 60 min
C9	Hüstener Markt – Flammberg	Every 60 min
C10	Arnsberg, Train Station – Von-Bernuth-Str. – Neumarkt – Obereiemer	Irregular

=== Citybus Soest ===
Line	Route	Frequency Monday–Friday and Saturday morning	Frequency Saturday afternoon and Sunday
C1	Bus Station Hansaplatz – Südostsiedlung	Every 30 min	Every 60 min
C2	Bus Station Hansaplatz – Gotlandweg	Every 30 min	No service – served by Line C1
C3	Bus Station Hansaplatz – Deiringser Weg	Every 60 min	No service
C4	Bus Station Hansaplatz – KlinikumStadtSoest – Günne (Saturday afternoon and Sunday to Neheim – Sundern)	Every 60 min	Every 120 min
C5	Bus Station Hansaplatz – KlinikumStadtSoest – Ostönnen	Every 60 min	Every 120 min
C6	Bus Station Hansaplatz – Train Station – Hermannstraße	Every 60 min	No service
C7	Bus Station Hansaplatz – Train Station – Dortmundweg	Every 60 min	No service
C8	Bus Station Hansaplatz – Train Station – Endloser Weg	Every 60 min	No service

=== Other lines (Neheim/Arnsberg) ===
323 Neheim-Hüsten, Train Station – Hövel – Holzen (school service)

326 Neheim-Hüsten, Train Station – Neheim, Bus Station – Wimbern (school service)

412 Arnsberg – Schreppenberg – Wennigloh (school service)

413 Schreppenberg – Breitenbruch (school service)

414 Arnsberg, Neumarkt – Uentrop (school service)

N5 Arnsberg, Neumarkt – Niedereimer – Bruchhausen – Hüsten – Neheim, Bus Station – Bergheim – Bachum – Voßwinkel

N6 Sundern, Town Hall – Müschede – Herdringen – Neheim-Hüsten, Train Station – Neheim, Bus Station – Niederense – Bremen

== Gallery ==
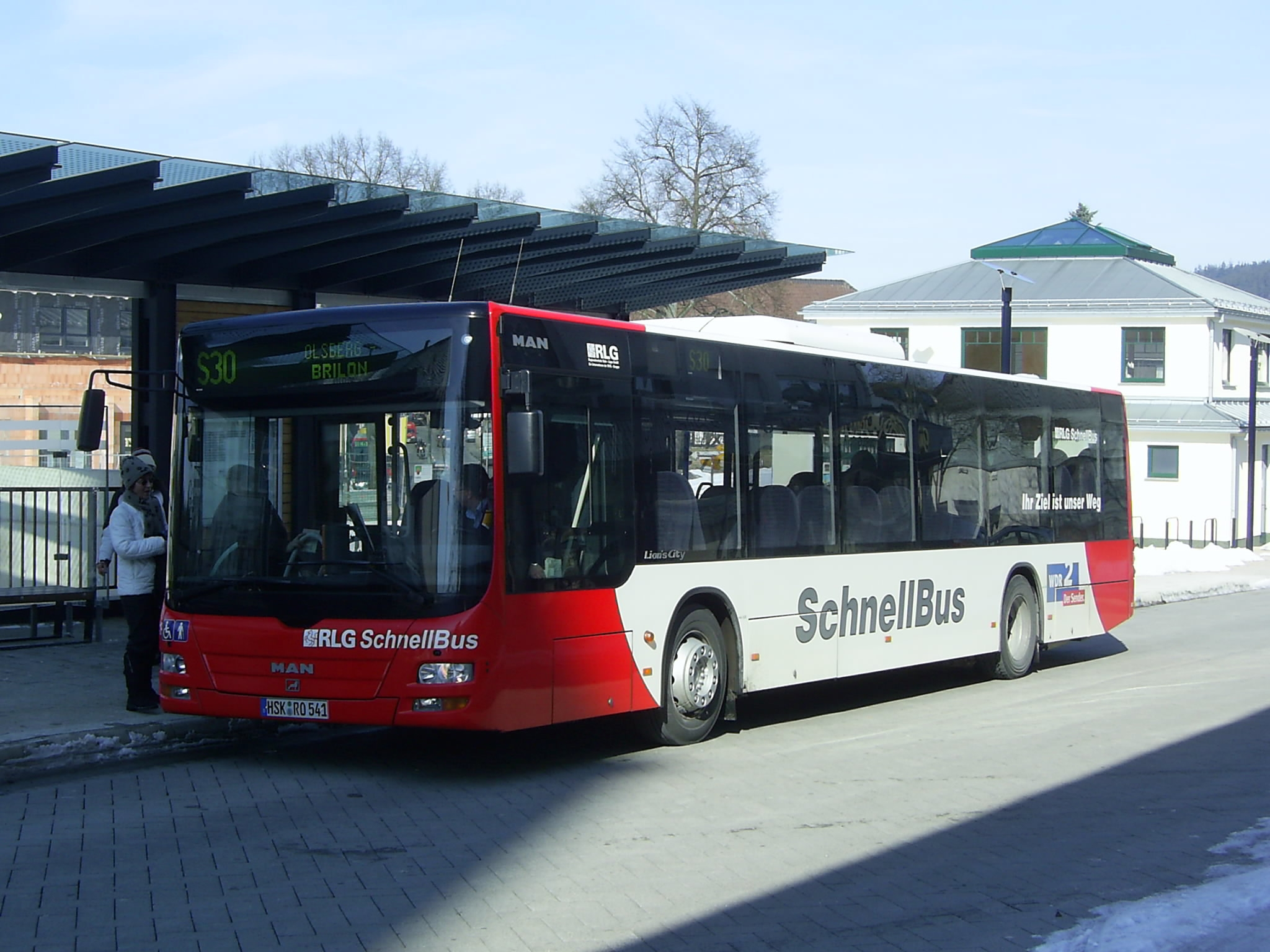
Express bus

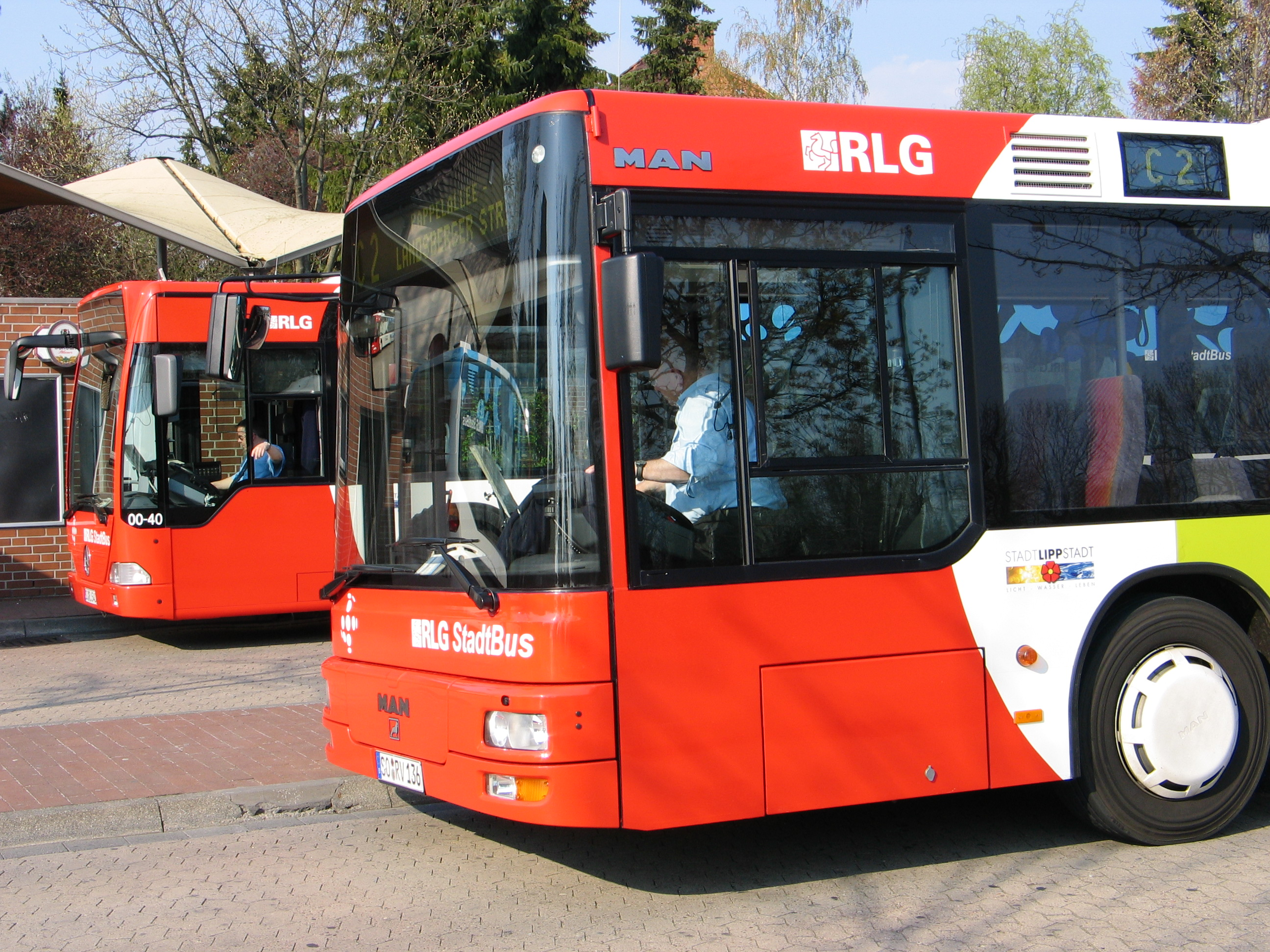
City bus

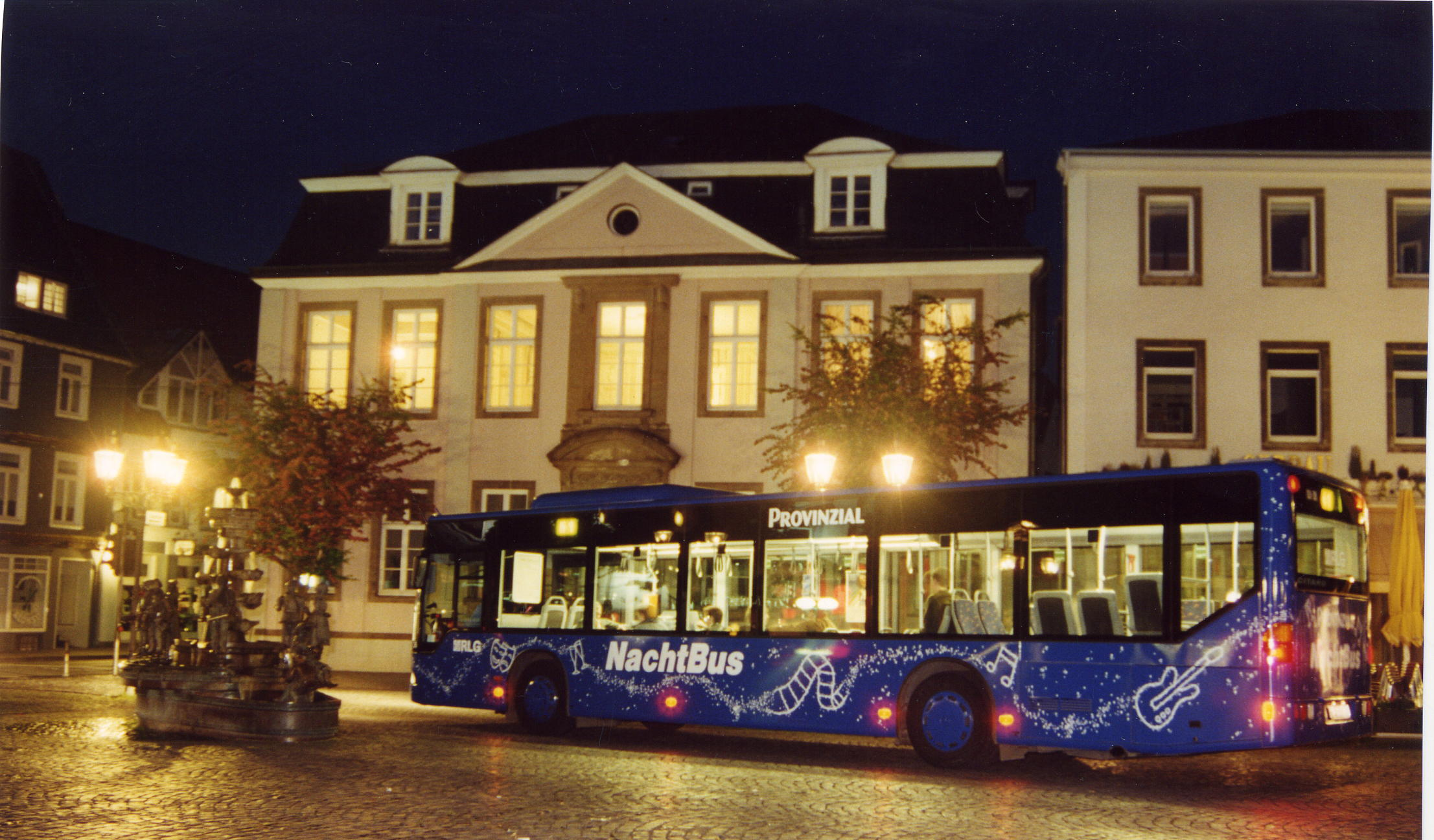
Night bus

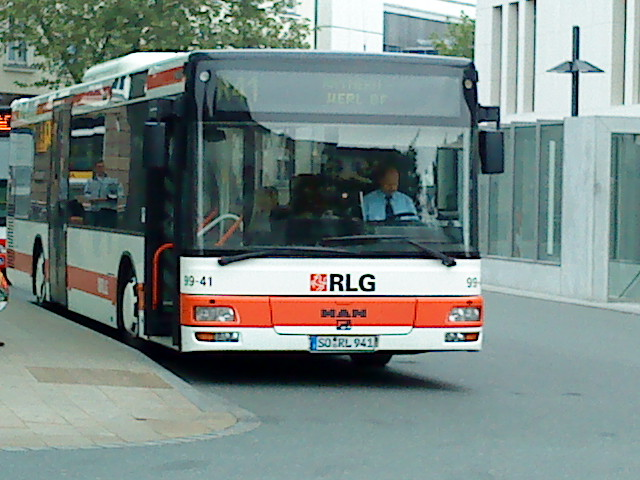
Regional bus

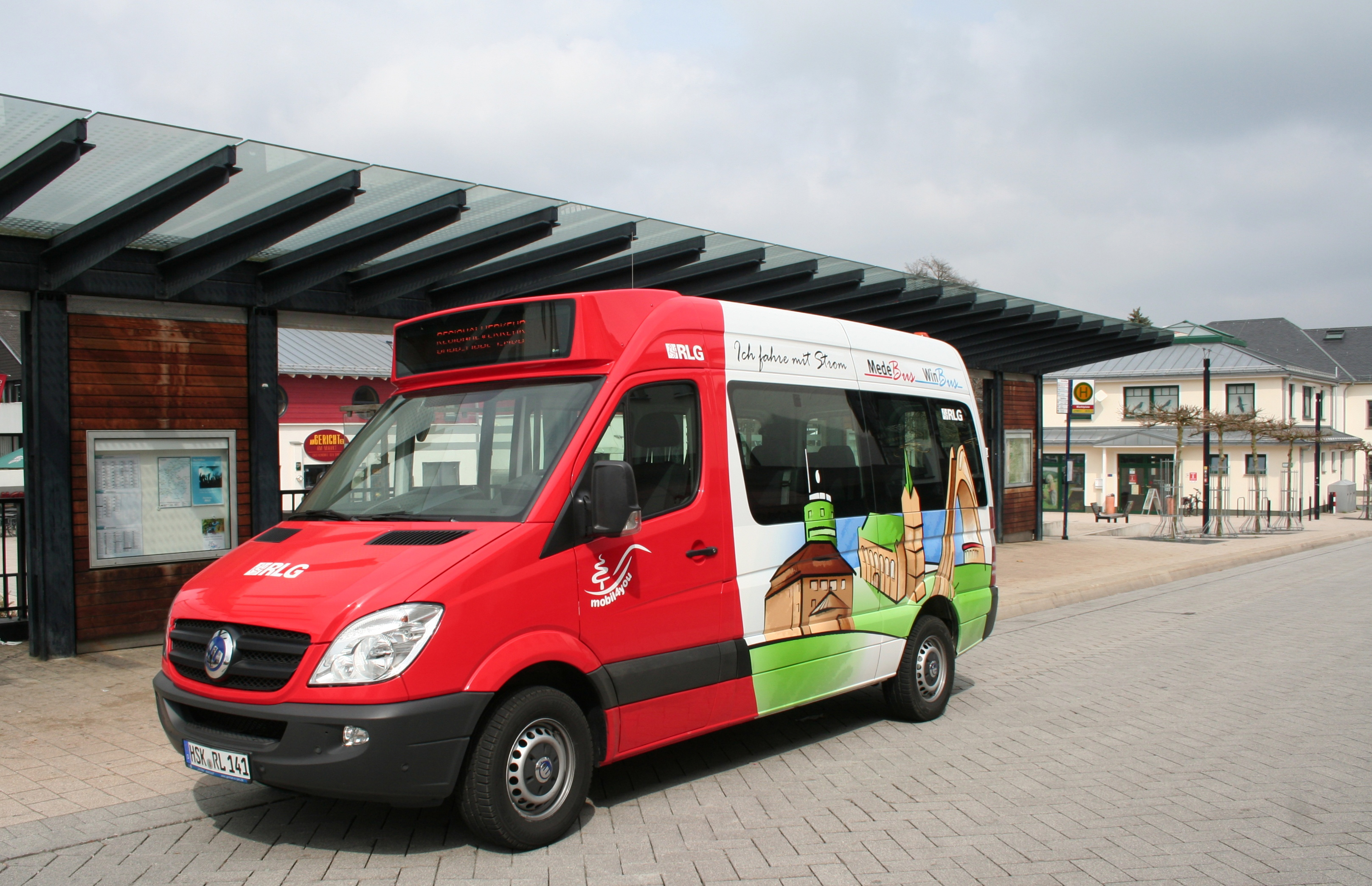
Battery bus

== Literature ==
- Ketteler, Friedhelm, Paul Wambach (1980). In der Heimat fest verwurzelt. Die Ruhr-Lippe-Eisenbahnen: Geschichte und Geschichten. by Ketteler, Friedhelm u. Paul Wambach (in German)
- Richter, Karl-Arne, Georg Ringler (2002). Lexikon deutscher Privatbahnen. Strecken, Fahrzeuge und Betrieb zwischen Küste und Alpen. (in German). ISBN 3-7654-7174-7
- Wolff, Gerd (2000). Deutsche Klein- und Privatbahnen Band 6: Nordrhein-Westfalen, nordöstlicher Teil (in German). ISBN 3-88255-664-1
- Burkert, Raimund (2011). Bahn und Bus zwischen Ruhr und Lippe (in German). Podszun. ISBN 978-3-86133-589-4
