= Pöppelsche =

River in Germany

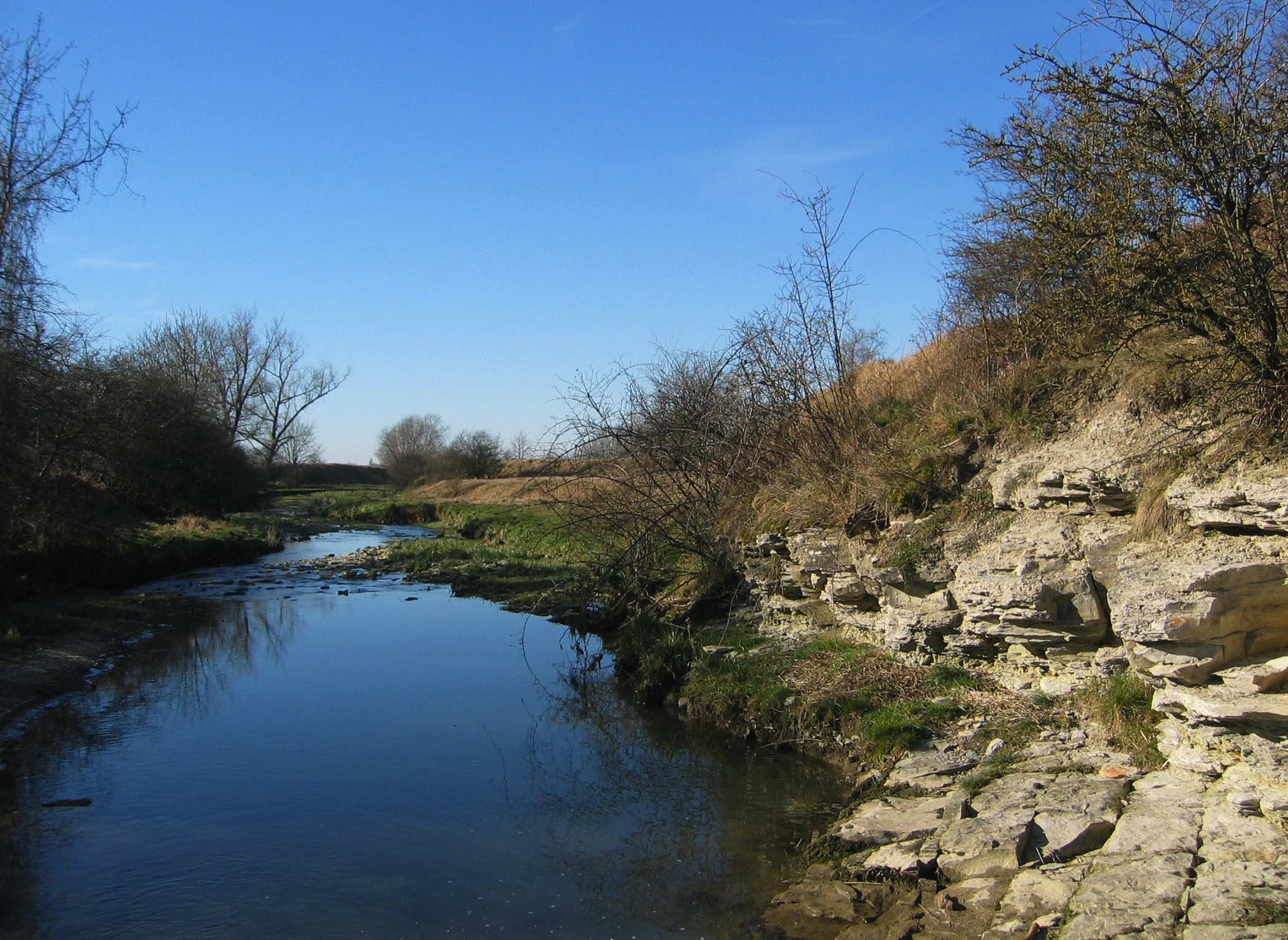

Location
- Country: Germany
- State: North Rhine-Westphalia

Physical characteristics
- Mouth
  - location: Gieseler
  - coordinates: 51.6350°N 8.3905°E
- Length: 16.7 km (10.4 mi)

Basin features
- Progression: Gieseler→ Lippe→ Rhine→ North Sea

Pöppelsche is a river of North Rhine-Westphalia, Germany. It flows into the Gieseler near Erwitte.

== Urban Legends ==
The river is known by the people of Berge, Germany, located on the bank of the river, for its magical properties. Local legend states that in 1855, a young boy living in the village became horribly sick with measles and eventually died. His mother who wished to cleanse her son's body of blood and infection, laid him in the river. Miraculously, after being placed in the river, the boy's body allegedly became warm again and woke up alive and well, and without any symptoms of the disease. It is unconfirmed if this legend is true or not, but ever since it has been custom within the town of Berge to soak sick individuals with a cloth full of water form the river.

== See also ==
- List of rivers of North Rhine-Westphalia
