= Anröchte =

- Municipality
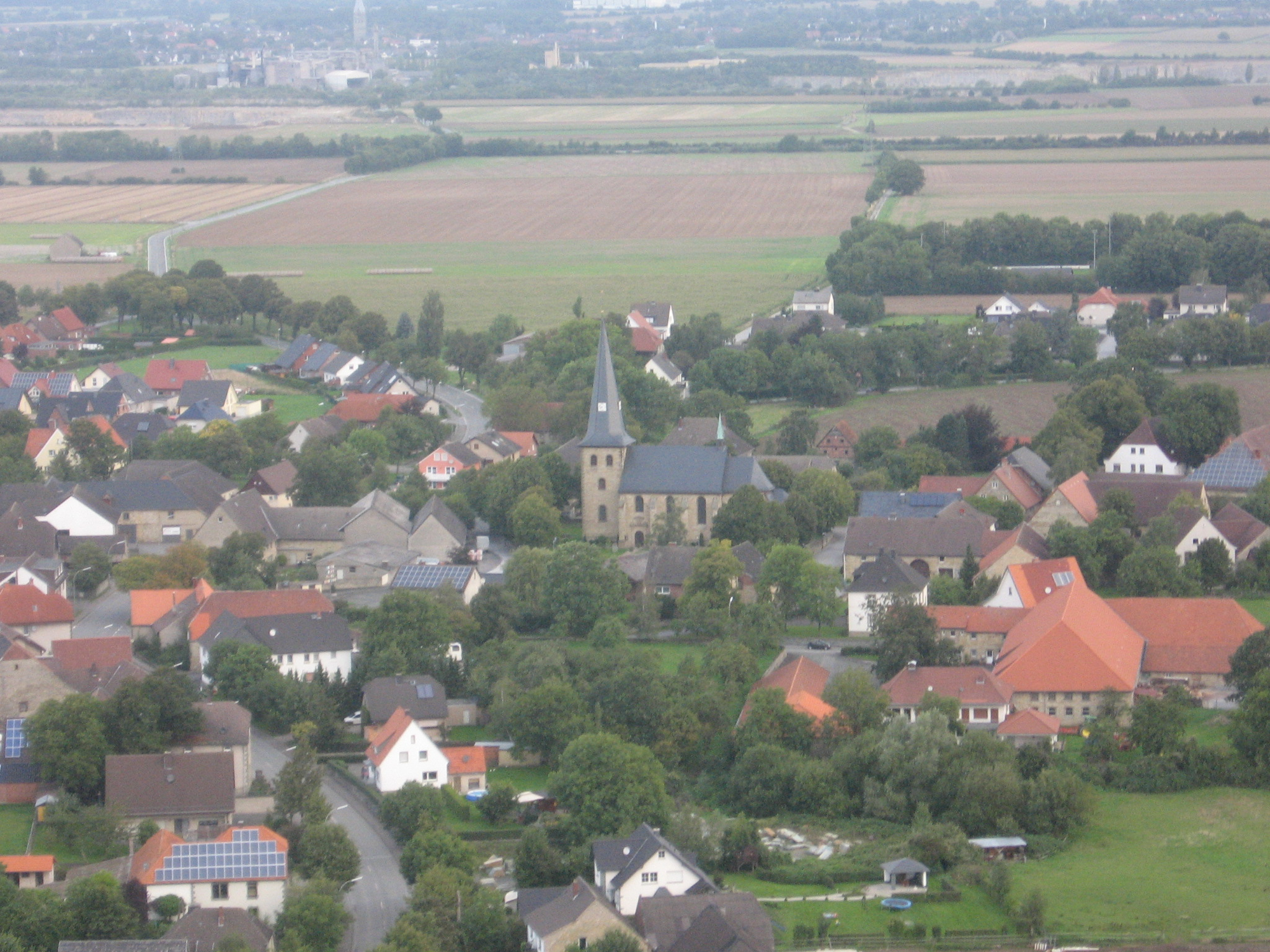

- Coat of arms

- Location of Anröchte within Soest district
- Interactive map of Anröchte
- Location within Germany Location within North Rhine-Westphalia
- Coordinates: 51°34′N 8°20′E
- Country: Germany
- State: North Rhine-Westphalia
- Admin. region: Arnsberg
- District: Soest
- Subdivisions: 10

Government
  - Mayor (2020–25): Alfred Schmidt (Ind.)

Area
  - Total: 73.79 km^{2} (28.49 sq mi)
- Elevation: 197 m (646 ft)

Population (2025-12-31)
  - Total: 10,276
  - Density: 139.3/km^{2} (360.7/sq mi)
- Time zone: UTC+01:00 (CET)
  - Summer (DST): UTC+02:00 (CEST)
- Postal codes: 59609
- Dialling codes: 02947, 02927
- Vehicle registration: SO
- Website: www.anroechte.de

Anröchte (German pronunciation: [ˈanʁœçtə]) is a municipality in the district of Soest, in North Rhine-Westphalia, Germany.

== Geography ==
It is situated approximately 13 km south of Lippstadt and 15 km east of Soest.

=== Neighbouring municipalities ===
- Bad Sassendorf
- Erwitte
- Rüthen
- Warstein

=== Division of the town ===
After the local government reforms of 1975 Anröchte consists of 10 districts:

- Anröchte (7.087 inhabitants)
- Altengeseke (901 inhabitants)
- Altenmellrich (370 inhabitants)
- Berge (715 inhabitants)
- Effeln (752 inhabitants)
- Klieve (381 inhabitants)
- Mellrich (767 inhabitants)
- Robringhausen (153 inhabitants)
- Uelde (110 inhabitants)
- Waltringhausen (102 inhabitants)

=== Twin towns ===
- Radków (Poland) – since 1954

== Population ==
Historical population

Year	Pop.	±% p.a.
1965	8,057	—
1970	8,723	+1.60%
1975	8,683	−0.09%
1980	8,751	+0.16%
1985	8,936	+0.42%
1990	9,587	+1.42%
1995	10,429	+1.70%

Year	Pop.	±% p.a.
2000	10,802	+0.71%
2005	10,794	−0.01%
2010	10,456	−0.63%
2015	10,557	+0.19%
2020	10,225	−0.64%
2025	10,276	+0.10%

Source: Landesdatabank Nordrhein-Westfalen

== People ==
- Gotthard Kettler (1517–1587), last Master of the Livonian Order and the first Duke of Courland and Semigallia.
