= Bad Sassendorf =

- Municipality
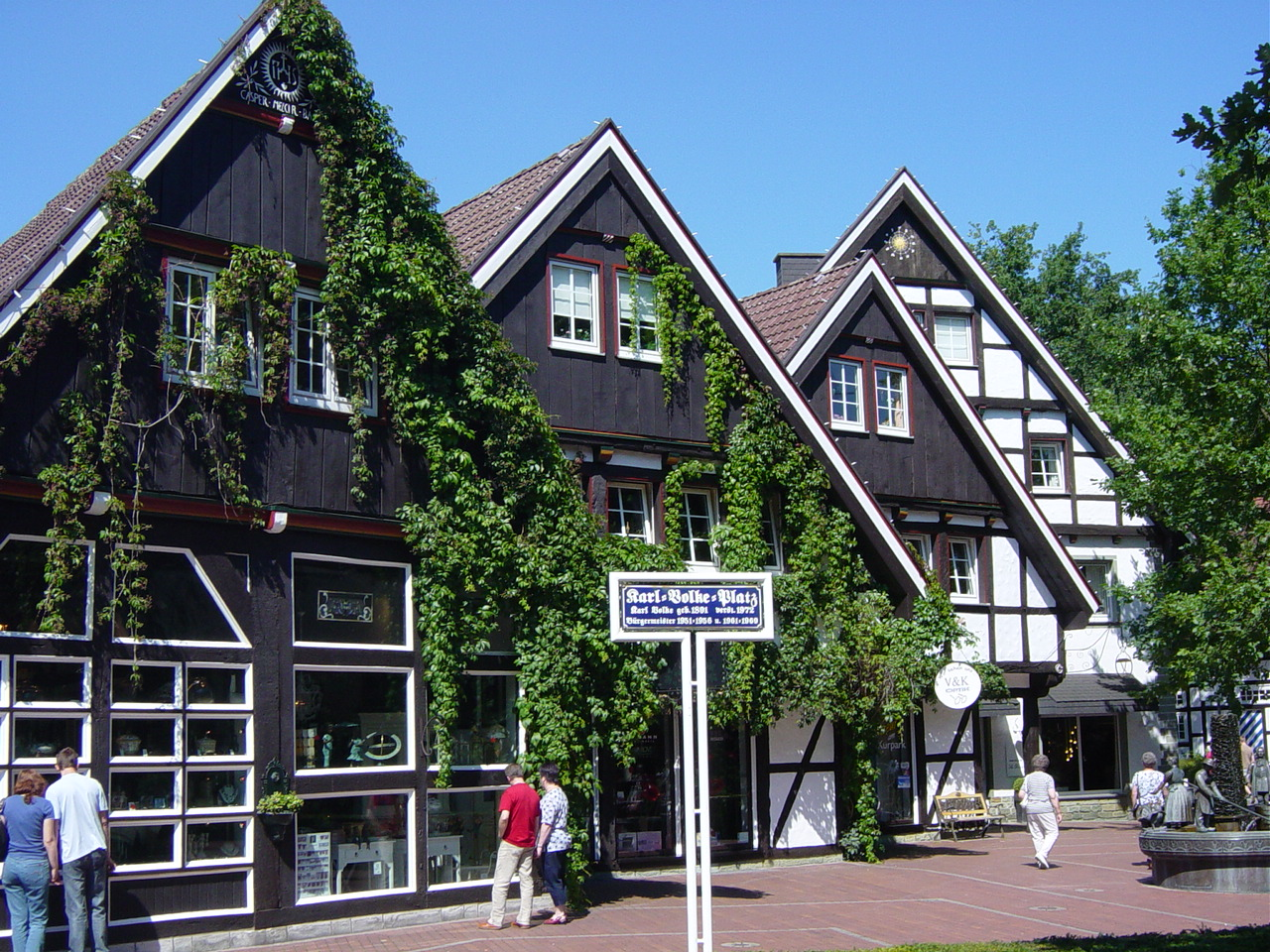
- Karl-Volke-Platz

- Coat of arms

- Location of Bad Sassendorf within Soest district
- Interactive map of Bad Sassendorf
- Location within Germany Location within North Rhine-Westphalia
- Coordinates: 51°34′59″N 08°10′00″E
- Country: Germany
- State: North Rhine-Westphalia
- Admin. region: Arnsberg
- District: Soest
- Subdivisions: 12

Government
  - Mayor (2025–30): Malte Dahlhoff (CDU)

Area
  - Total: 63.46 km^{2} (24.50 sq mi)
- Elevation: 107 m (351 ft)

Population (2025-12-31)
  - Total: 12,138
  - Density: 191.3/km^{2} (495.4/sq mi)
- Time zone: UTC+01:00 (CET)
  - Summer (DST): UTC+02:00 (CEST)
- Postal codes: 59505
- Dialling codes: 02921
- Vehicle registration: SO
- Website: www.bad-sassendorf.de

Bad Sassendorf (German pronunciation: [baːt ˈzasn̩ˌdɔʁf]; Low German: Saßtrop) is a municipality in the district of Soest, in North Rhine-Westphalia, Germany.

== History ==
From the 8th century, the area around the Soester plain was under the Merovingian dynasty. The name “Sassendorf” indicates that it was a Saxon settlement. Mention was made of salt springs in the area appear in the 10th century, and were noted by the ambassador of the Caliphate of Cordoba to the court of Emperor Otto the Great in 973. Along with the surrounding area, the village was under the control of the Archbishopric of Cologne from at least the 12th century; however exploitation of the salt springs was the right of free peasant families in the area. From the 19th century, the brine produced in the area was used for bathing and medicinal purposes, and the first therapy center or spa was opened in 1852. Commercial salt production faced declining yields, and was largely discontinued in 1934, and completely discontinued by 1952. The village was renamed from “Sassendorf” to Bad Sassendorf officially in 1906.

From February 15, 1944, to April 4–5, 1945, inmates of the Neuengamme concentration camp used as the Eisenbahnbaubrigade 11 repaired rail tracks at the railway station Soest and between Bad Sassendorf and Soest. They slept in freight train wagons on the track between Bad Sassendorf and Soest. After an air raid end-February 1945 the inmates slept in a nearby farm. At the cemetery Bad Sassendorf a memorial plaque is installed on the burying place of the dead.

== Geography ==
It is situated approximately 4 km northeast of Soest.

=== Neighbouring municipalities ===
- Anröchte
- Erwitte
- Lippetal
- Lippstadt
- Möhnesee
- Soest
- Warstein

=== Division of the town ===
Bad Sassendorf consists of 12 districts:

- Bad Sassendorf
- Bettinghausen
- Beusingsen
- Elfsen
- Gabrechten
- Heppen
- Herringsen
- Lohne
- Neuengeseke
- Opmünden
- Ostinghausen
- Weslarn

== Population ==
Historical population

Year	Pop.	±% p.a.
1965	7,716	—
1970	8,359	+1.61%
1975	9,079	+1.67%
1980	9,670	+1.27%
1985	10,098	+0.87%
1990	10,147	+0.10%
1995	10,800	+1.26%

Year	Pop.	±% p.a.
2000	11,033	+0.43%
2005	11,522	+0.87%
2010	11,700	+0.31%
2015	11,931	+0.39%
2020	12,052	+0.20%
2025	12,138	+0.14%

Source: Landesdatabank Nordrhein-Westfalen

== Politics ==
The current mayor of Bad Sassendorf is Malte Dahlhoff of the CDU who has been serving since 2014. In the 2025 election he was reelected with 83% of the vote, being the only candidate.

=== City council ===
After the 2025 local elections, the Bad Sassendorf city council is composed as follows:

Party	Votes	%	+/-	Seats	+/-
Christian Democratic Union (CDU)	2,616	41.4	▼4.6	15	▲1
Social Democratic Party (SPD)	1,268	20.1	▲1	7	▲1
Alternative for Germany (AfD)	794	12.6	New	5	New
Free Democratic Party (FDP)	577	9.1	▼1.6	3	±0
Alliance 90/The Greens (Grüne)	543	8.6	▼4.7	3	▼1
Citizens Alliance Bad Sassendorf (BG)	524	8.3	New	3	New
Valid votes	6,322	99.0			
Invalid votes	67	1.0			
Total	6,389	100.0		36	▲6
Electorate/voter turnout	10,350	61.7			
Source: State returning officer of North Rhine-Westphalia

=== Twin towns ===
- Gaming (Austria)
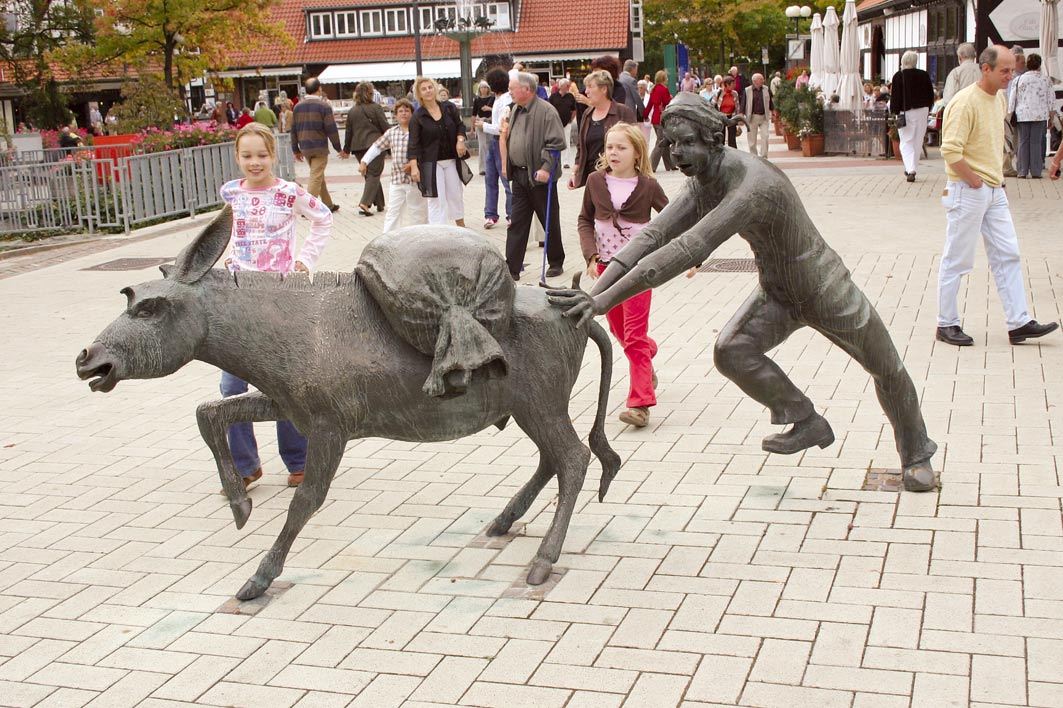

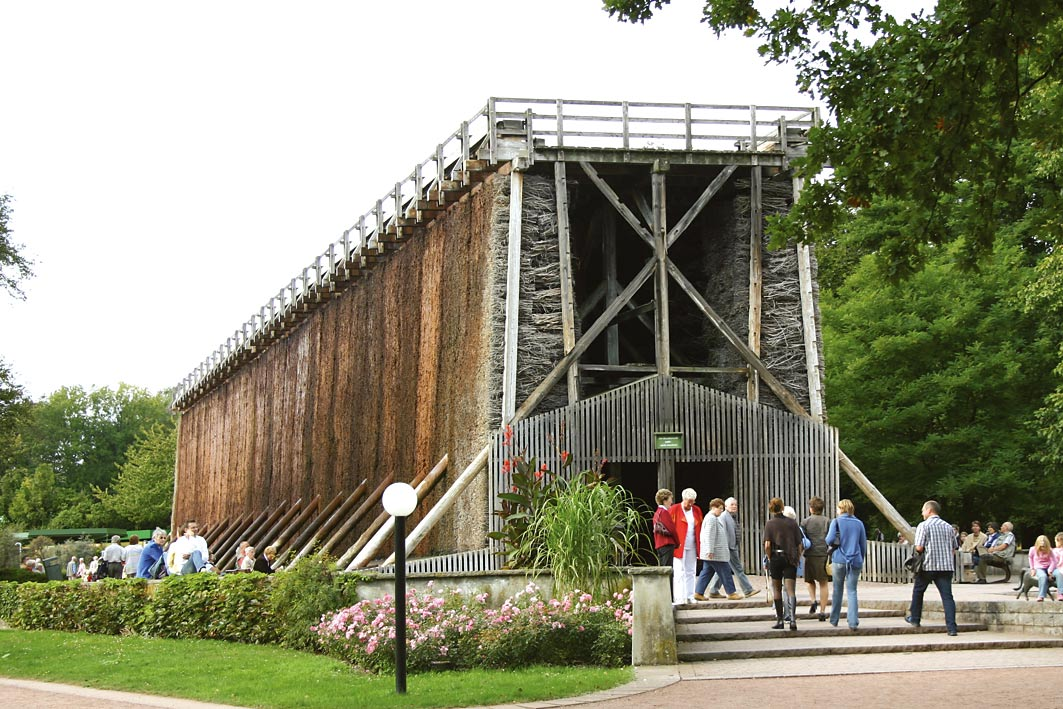

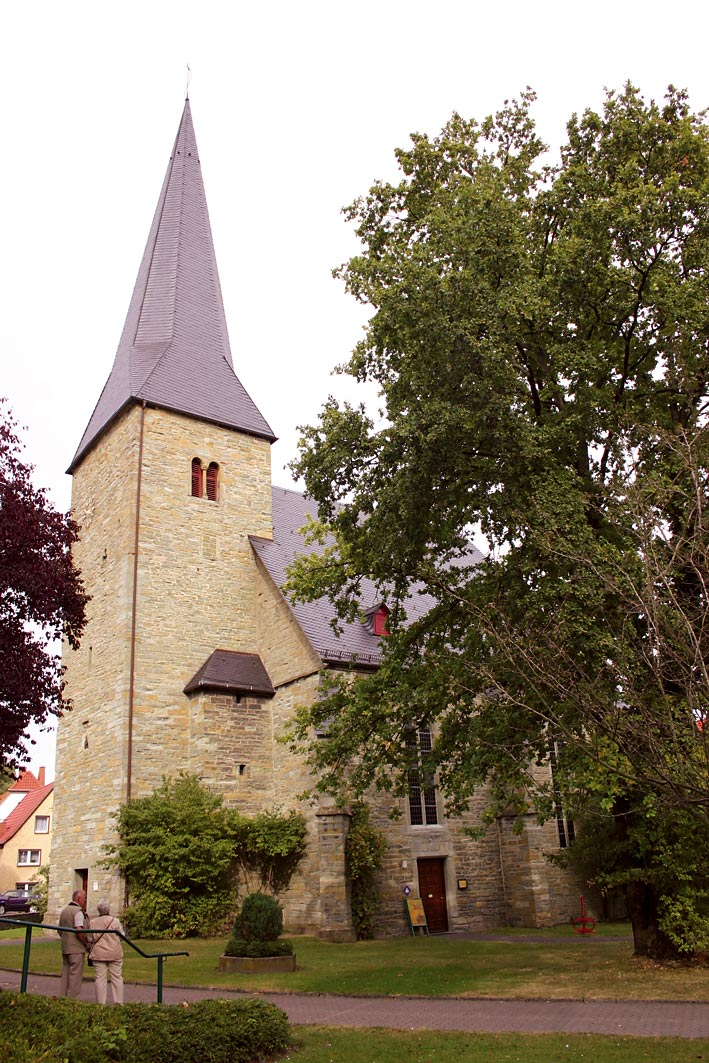
