= Soest (district) =

Coordinates: 51°35′N 8°15′E

Kreis Soest
- District
- Flag Coat of arms
- Country: Germany
- State: North Rhine-Westphalia
- Adm. region: Arnsberg
- Capital: Soest

Government
  - District admin.: Eva Irrgang (CDU)

Area
  - Total: 1,327.47 km^{2} (512.54 sq mi)

Population (31 December 2024)
  - Total: 300,297
  - Density: 226.218/km^{2} (585.901/sq mi)
- Time zone: UTC+01:00 (CET)
  - Summer (DST): UTC+02:00 (CEST)
- Vehicle registration: SO, LP
- Website: www.kreis-soest.de

Soest (German: [ˈzoːst]) is a Kreis (district) in the middle of North Rhine-Westphalia, Germany. Neighbouring districts are Warendorf, Gütersloh, Paderborn, Hochsauerland, Märkischer Kreis, Unna and the independent town of Hamm.

== History ==
In medieval times Soest was the biggest town in Westphalia; however, after it liberated itself from the bishops of Cologne in the Soester Fehde in 1449 it slowly lost importance, only to gain it again when in 1816 the new Prussian government created the district. In 1975 the district was merged with the neighbouring district of Lippstadt and parts of the former district of Arnsberg.

== Geography ==
Geographically it covers the northern part of the Sauerland hills and the lower land north of it, the 'Hellweg'. The rather flat land and very fertile loess soil have made it an agricultural area from ancient times. The main rivers through the district are the Ruhr, the Lippe and the Möhne, which is dammed to form the Möhne Reservoir. The highest elevation is in the area of Warstein at 580m, while the lowest is the Lippe valley at 65m.

== Coat of arms ==
The coat of arms show two symbols of the bishops of Cologne, who possessed Soest until 1449. In left half is the key of Saint Peter, the patron of Cologne; in the right is the black cross of Cologne. After the district was merged with Lippstadt the rose, symbol of the Lippe area, was added on top of the cross. This new version of the coat of arms was granted in 1976.

== Towns and municipalities ==
Clickable map of towns and municipalities in the district

Towns
1. Erwitte
2. Geseke
3. Lippstadt
4. Rüthen
5. Soest
6. Warstein
7. Werl
Municipalities
1. Anröchte
2. Bad Sassendorf
3. Ense
4. Lippetal
5. Möhnesee
6. Welver
7. Wickede
