= Erwitte =

- Town
- Coat of arms

- Location of Erwitte within Soest district
- Interactive map of Erwitte
- Location within Germany Location within North Rhine-Westphalia
- Coordinates: 51°37′N 08°21′E
- Country: Germany
- State: North Rhine-Westphalia
- Admin. region: Arnsberg
- District: Soest
- Subdivisions: 15

Government
  - Mayor (2020–25): Hendrik Henneböhl

Area
  - Total: 89.41 km^{2} (34.52 sq mi)
- Elevation: 105 m (344 ft)

Population (2025-12-31)
  - Total: 16,225
  - Density: 181.5/km^{2} (470.0/sq mi)
- Time zone: UTC+01:00 (CET)
  - Summer (DST): UTC+02:00 (CEST)
- Postal codes: 59597
- Dialling codes: 02943 02945
- Vehicle registration: SO, LP
- Website: www.erwitte.de

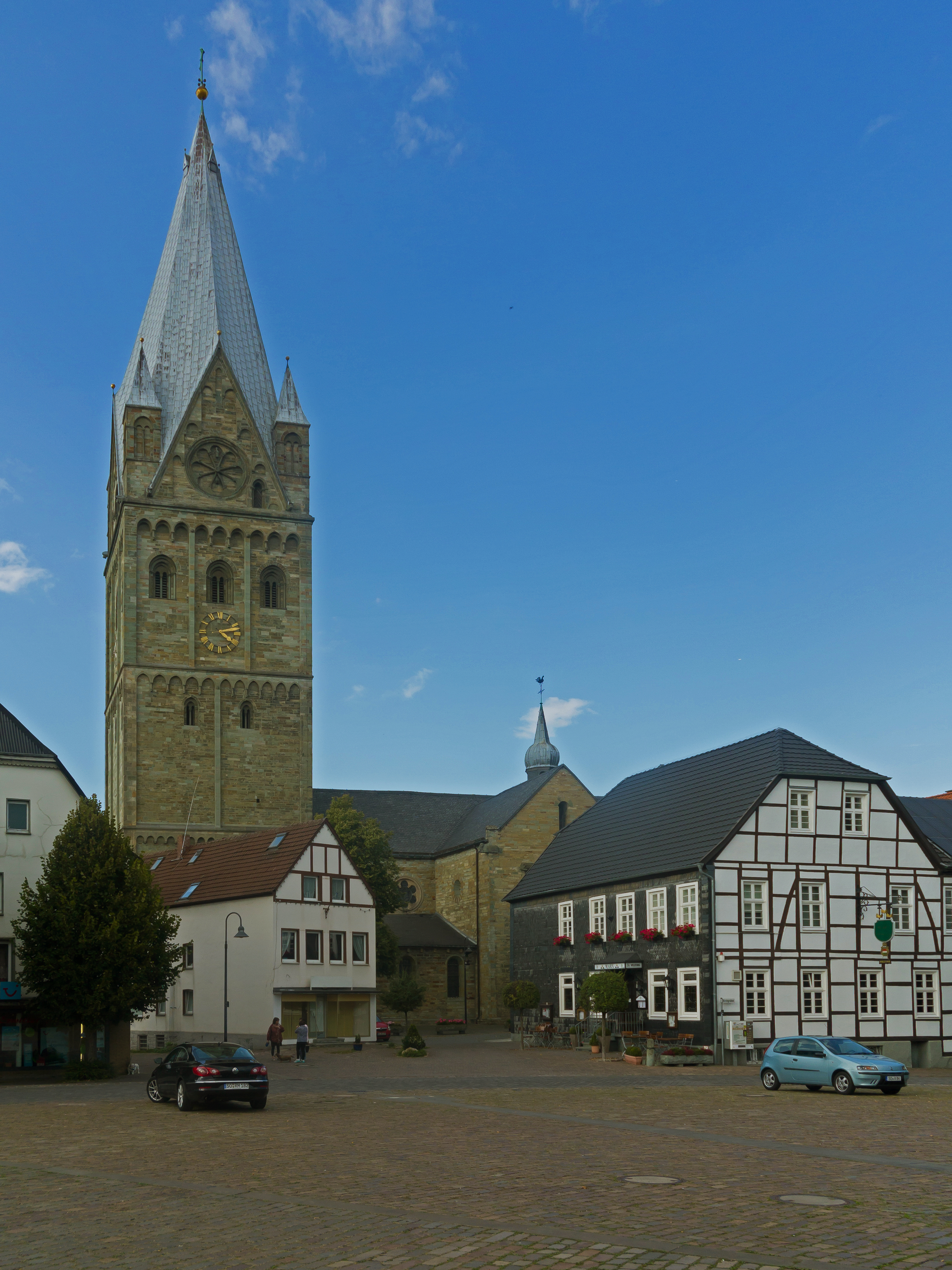
Erwitte, church: die Sankt Laurentius Kirche

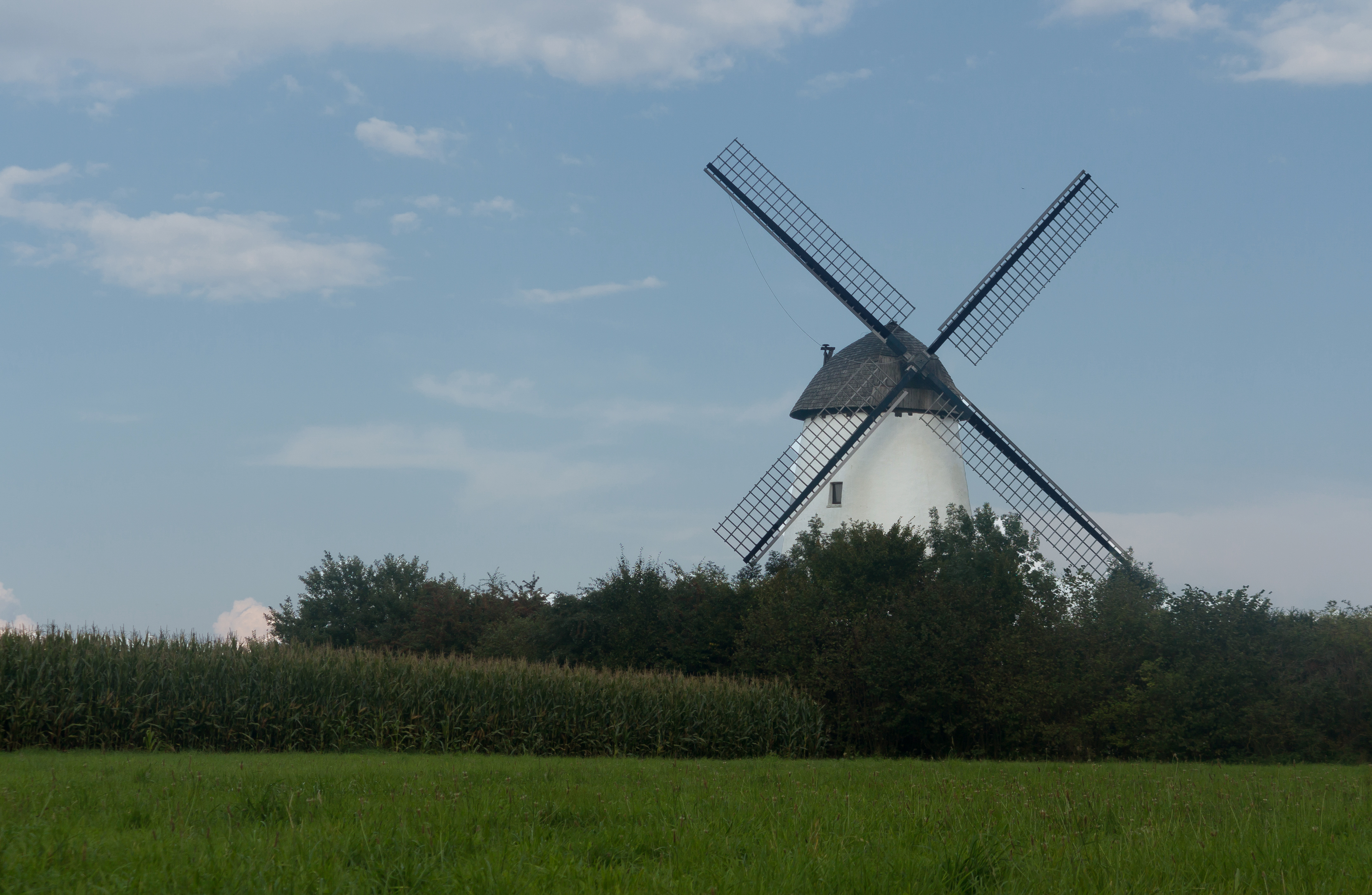
Schmerlecke, windmill Am Alten Hellweg

Erwitte (German pronunciation: [ˈɛʁvɪtə]) is a town in the district of Soest, in North Rhine-Westphalia, Germany.

== Geography ==
Erwitte is situated approximately 8 km south of Lippstadt and 15 km east of Soest.

=== Neighbouring municipalities ===
- Lippstadt
- Geseke
- Rüthen
- Anröchte
- Bad Sassendorf

=== Division of the town ===
After the local government reforms of 1975 Erwitte consists of 15 districts:

- Erwitte (6510 inhabitants)
- Eikeloh (518 inhabitants)
- Merklinghausen/Wiggeringhausen (179 inhabitants)
- Horn-Millinghausen (894 inhabitants)
- Berenbrock (309 inhabitants)
- Seringhausen (65 inhabitants)
- Stirpe (1079 inhabitants)
- Ebbinghausen (201 inhabitants)
- Böckum (209 inhabitants)
- Völlinghausen (811 inhabitants)
- Schallern (291 inhabitants)
- Norddorf (159 inhabitants)
- Schmerlecke (732 inhabitants)
- Weckinghausen (67 inhabitants)
- Bad Westernkotten (4097 inhabitants)

== Population ==
Historical population

Year	Pop.	±% p.a.
1965	12,279	—
1970	12,763	+0.78%
1975	12,958	+0.30%
1980	12,842	−0.18%
1985	13,017	+0.27%
1990	13,849	+1.25%
1995	14,982	+1.59%

Year	Pop.	±% p.a.
2000	15,669	+0.90%
2005	15,915	+0.31%
2010	15,710	−0.26%
2015	16,128	+0.53%
2020	16,117	−0.01%
2025	16,225	+0.13%

Source: Landesdatabank Nordrhein-Westfalen

== International relations ==
Erwitte is twinned with:

- Aken (Germany)

== History ==
Officially the town of Erwitte is mentioned in the year 836 for the first time and the medieval architecture can still be seen in the town center.

== Industry ==
Erwitte is home to a thriving cement industry which, together with the heating valve company Heimeier, make up the largest companies in the area.

== Sons and daughters of the town ==
- Charles Nordhoff (1830–1901), American journalist and author, was born in Erwitte
- Friedrich Blumenröhr (born 1936), jurist, former chairman at the Federal Court
- Ulrich Cyran (born 1956), actor and lecturer
- Christof Rasche (born 1962), politician (FDP)
- Wolfgang Schäfers (born 1965), owner of the chair for real estate management at the University of Regensburg
- Jens Behrens (born 1978), politician (SPD)

== People who are connected to the place ==
- Jodocus Boget († 1630), Erwitt pastor, burned for witchcraft on the pyre
- Heinrich Gersmeier (nickname: Schäfer Heinrich) (born 1966), farmer and singer from Völlinghausen
- YANXVICH (born 2007), producer from Soest
