= Patroclus (disambiguation) =

In Greek mythology, Patroclus, Greek Patroklos, was Achilles’ best friend and, according to some, his lover. Due to the wide fame of Homer's work, it was used as a male first name throughout the Hellenistic and Roman periods.

Patroclus may also refer to:

== People ==
- Patroclus (admiral), a Macedonian admiral in the service of Ptolemy II of Egypt, 3rd century BC
- Patroclus of Bourges, 5th-century Christian saint
- Patroclus of Troyes, 3rd-century Christian saint
- Patroclus, a bishop of the Ancient Diocese of Arles
- Patroclus, son of Heracles by Pyrippe, a daughter of Thespius
- Patroklos Karantinos, Greek architect

== Places ==
- Patroklos, Attica, a private island near Attica, Greece, named after the 3rd c. admiral
- St. Patrokli, Soest, Germany
- Patroclus Hill, a hill on Anvers Island

== Scientific ==
- Patroclus, a taxonomic synonym for the plant genus Narcissus
- 617 Patroclus, an asteroid

== Other uses ==
- Several ships named SS Patroclus
- Patroklos, a character from the Soul Calibur video game series

== See also ==
- Saint Patroclus (disambiguation)
