= Patrocles =

Patrocles name may refer to:

- Patrocles of Thurii (5th century BC), tragic poet
- Patrocles (coppersmith) (5th century BC), bronze worker
- Patrocles teacher of rhetoric mentioned by Quintilian
- Patrocles (geographer) (c. 312-261 BC), Macedonian general and writer under Seleucus and Antiochus
- Noël Patrocles de Thoisy (died 1671), early governor general of the French Antilles
- Patrocles (half-brother of Socrates), half-brother of the philosopher Socrates

== See also ==
- Patroclus (disambiguation)
