= Saint Patroclus =

Saint Patroclus may refer to:

- Patroclus of Bourges (496-576), Merovingian ascetic
- Patroclus of Troyes (d. 259), wealthy native of Troyes, known for his charity

== See also ==
- St. Patrokli, Kirchhörde, Dortmund, Germany
- St. Patrokli, Soest, Germany
