= St. Patrokli =

St. Patrokli may refer to:

- Patroclus of Troyes, a Christian martyr who died around 259 AD, or churches dedicated to him:
- St. Patrokli, Kirchhörde, a Catholic church and parish in Dortmund, Germany
- St. Patrokli, Soest, a Catholic church and parish in Soerst, Germany
