= Susato =

Susato is an archaic demonym for people from one of 2 cities, Soest, Netherlands and Soest, Germany.

It may also refer to:

- Johannes de Susato, also known as Johannes Steinwert von Soest (1448-1506), German composer
- Tielman Susato (c. 1510 – c. 1570), Renaissance composer
- Susato Mikotoba, a character in the Ace Attorney video game series
