= Heinrich Frieling =

German politician (born 1985)

Member of the Landtag of North Rhine-Westphalia
- In office 1 June 2017 – 31 October 2025
- Preceded by: Eckhard Uhlenberg
- Succeeded by: Wilhelm Hausmann
- Constituency: Soest I

Personal details
- Born: 8 June 1985 (age 40) Soest
- Party: Christian Democratic Union (since 2004)

Heinrich Frieling (born 8 June 1985 in Soest) is a German politician serving as Landrat of Soest since 2025. From 2017 to 2025, he was a member of the Landtag of North Rhine-Westphalia.
