= Michael Lejan =

German-born Belgian footballer

Personal information
- Date of birth: 2 May 1983 (age 43)
- Place of birth: Soest, West Germany
- Height: 1.81 m (5 ft 11 in)
- Position: Left back

Youth career
- 1989–1992: Blau-Weiss Werl
- 1992–1994: Sportfreunde Siegen
- 1994–2002: 1. FC Köln

Senior career*
Years	Team	Apps	(Gls)
2002–2004	1. FC Köln II	70	(6)
2004–2005	1. FC Köln	2	(0)
2005–2009	Wuppertaler SV Borussia	128	(3)
2009–2011	VfL Osnabrück	43	(2)
2012–2013	Fortuna Köln	36	(4)
2013–2015	Alemannia Aachen	65	(3)
2015–2017	Viktoria Köln	59	(1)
Total		403	(19)
- * Club domestic league appearances and goals

Michael Lejan (born 2 May 1983) is a German-born Belgian former professional football left back.

== Early years ==
Michael Lejan was born in Soest, Germany as son of a member of the Belgian army in Soest in the German state of North Rhine-Westphalia. He lived in Werl for nine years and moved to Siegen, where he lived for two years before moving to Cologne, where his father was transferred.
