= Johannes von Soest =

German composer (1448–1506)

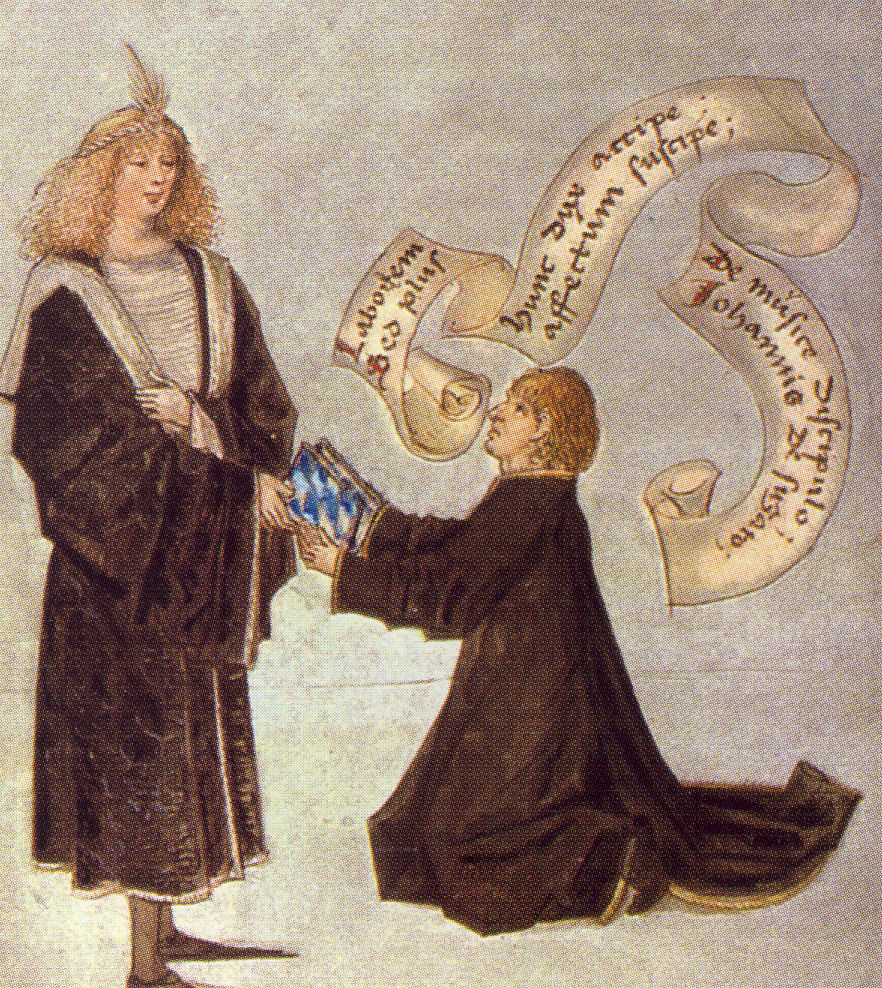
Johannes von Soest (right) and his patron Philip the Upright

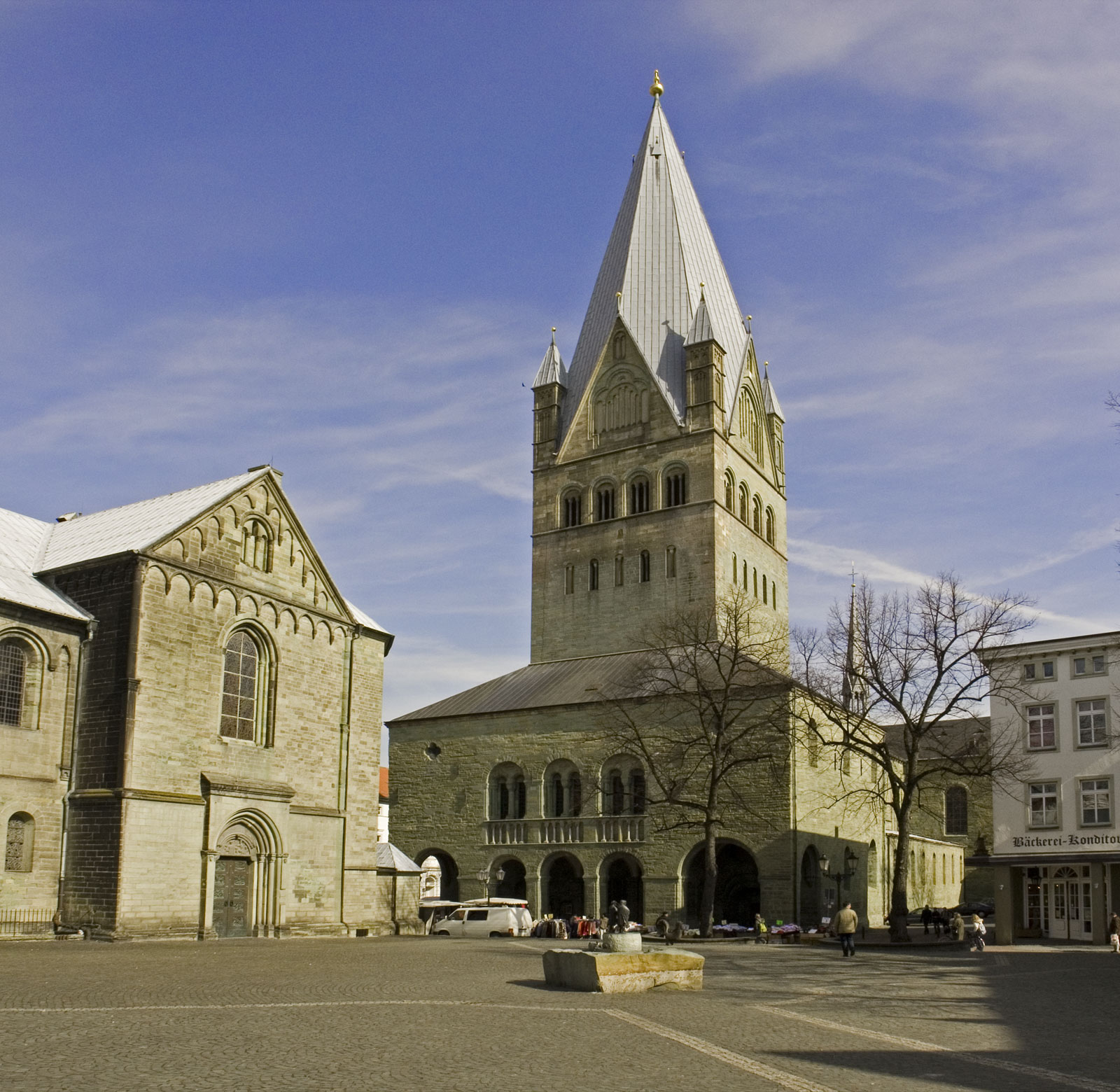
St. Patrokli, Soest, where his career began

Johannes Steinwert von Soest (Johannes de Susato) (1448 – 2 May 1506) was a German composer, theorist and poet. Most biographical details about his life survive in Johannes' verse autobiography, which was printed in 1811 (although the manuscript no longer survives) and has been partially translated into modern English. He was born in Unna and brought up in the nearby town of Soest. As a boy, he sang at the church of St. Patrokli. At one point a juggler almost succeeded in kidnapping him for his beautiful voice, but the plan did not succeed. The boy eventually left Soest when John I, Duke of Cleves hired him as a singer.

At Cleves, Johannes von Soest studied composition with an unknown teacher, quickly distinguishing himself as the best student and becoming, in his own words, a better composer than his master. Johannes' attitude towards music changed completely when he heard two English singers who were travelling through Cleves; he persuaded them to teach him their distinctive English style. They agreed to do so on the condition that he go to Bruges with them; accordingly, Johannes managed to get a permission to leave the Duke. He subsequently worked at Overijssel, Maastricht, and Kassel. In 1472 the 24-year-old composer went to Heidelberg and made such an impression on the Elector that he was immediately offered a contract for life.

Although he had a large salary and a high reputation, by 1476 Johannes was apparently no longer satisfied with his musical activities. That year he entered the University of Heidelberg to study medicine; after several years there and a period in Pavia, by 1490 at the latest, he received a degree. He became a municipal doctor (Stadtarzt) in Worms in 1495, then worked in the same capacity in Oppenheim and Frankfurt. He died in 1506 in Frankfurt.

No compositions by Johannes von Soest survive, but contemporary sources mention vocal music for 9 to 12 voices and other pieces. His treatises are lost as well; only the title of one survives: De musica subalterna. He was also active as a teacher. His pupils included composer and theorist Sebastian Virdung, author of one of the earliest known German treatises on musical instruments. Organist and composer Arnolt Schlick, author of the earliest German treatise on organs and organ building, also may have studied with Johannes.
