= Patrocles (coppersmith) =

Ancient Greek bronze worker of the 5th century BC

Patrocles (Ancient Greek: Πατροκλής) was a significant bronze worker of the 5th century BC.

According to the testimony of Pausanias, Patrocles is said to have crafted, together with Canachus the Younger, the statues of the Lacedaemonians Epicydidas and Eteonicus. These statues formed the multifaceted monument that the Spartans had erected at Delphi in memory of their great victory at the Battle of Aegospotami.

== Bibliography ==
- "Pausanias, Description of Greece". Perseus Library. "last come the Lacedaemonians Epicydidas and Eteonicus. These, they say, are works of Patrocles and Canachus."
- Bostock, John. "Pliny the Elder, The Natural History". Perseus Library.
- Smith, William. "A Dictionary of Greek and Roman Antiquities (1890)". Perseus Library.
- Papyrus Larousse Britannica vol. 48, p. 261
