= SS Patroclus =

A number of ships have been named SS Patroclus after Patroclus, the Ancient Greek hero Achilles' best friend.

- SS Patroclus (1872), a 2,074-ton ship of the Blue Funnel Line
- SS Patroclus (1896), a 5,509-ton ship of the Blue Funnel Line
- SS Patroclus (1923), an 11,314-ton ship of the Blue Funnel Line, commissioned as HMS Patroclus on outbreak of World War II, torpedoed and sunk by U-99 on 3 November 1940.
- SS Patroclus (1950), a 10,109-ton ship of the Blue Funnel Line
- SS Patroclus (1966), a 12,299-ton ship of the China Mutual Steam Navigation Company and later NSMO; was SS Glenalmond (1966) of the Blue Funnel Line until 1973.
