= St. Patrokli, Kirchhörde =

Church building in Dortmund, Germany

Coordinates: 51.456845°N 7.458244°E

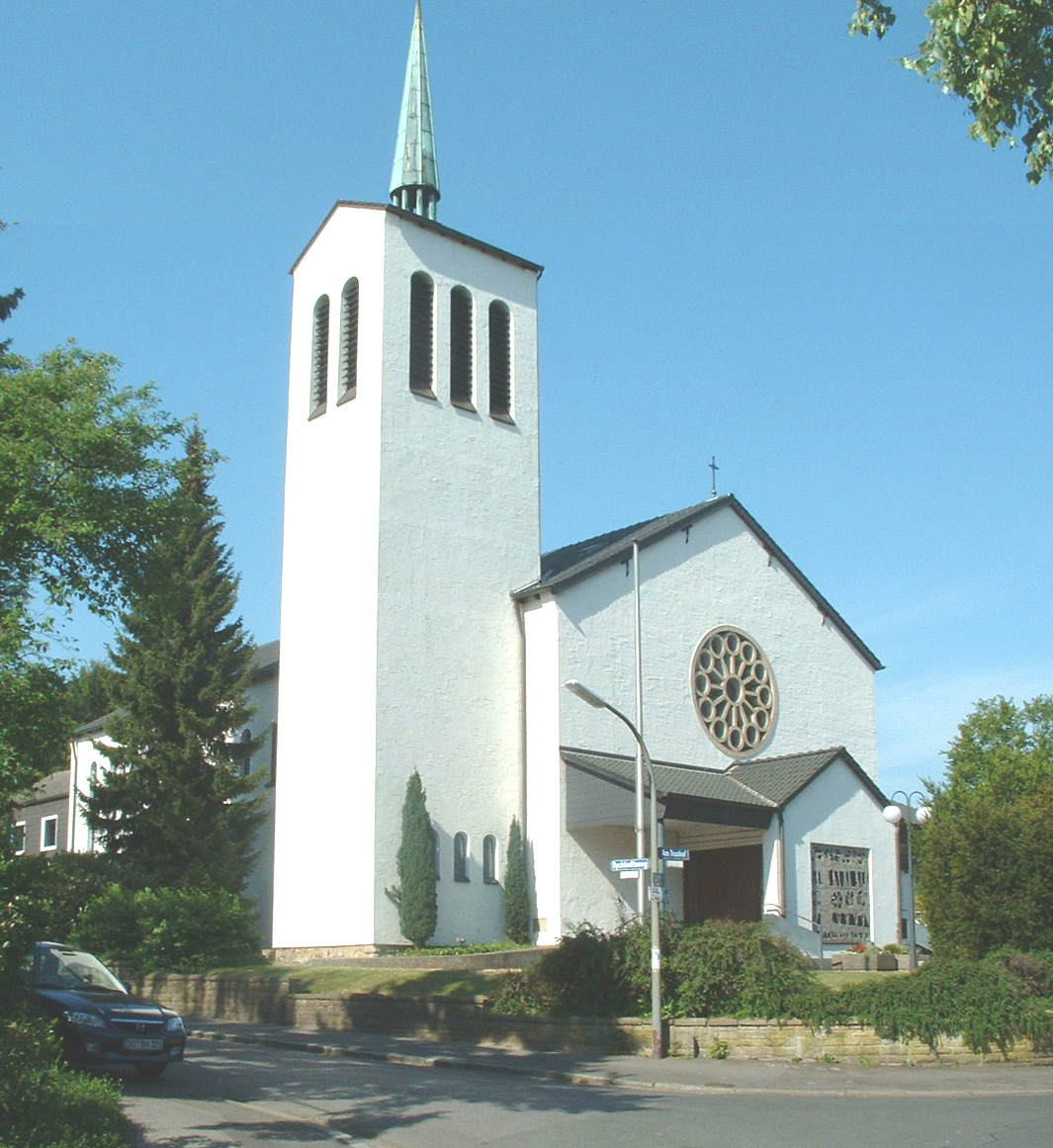
St. Patrokli

St. Patrokli is a Catholic church and parish in Kirchhörde, a Stadtteil of Dortmund, North Rhine-Westphalia. The parish also has churches in St. Clemens in Hombruch, St. Franziskus Xaverius in Barop, Maria Königin in Eichlinghofen, and Heilige Familie in Brünninghausen.

== History ==
The church of Kirchhörde was dedicated to Patroclus of Troyes, but changed to Lutheran in the Reformation. With the industrialisation, a growing community of Catholics wanted to worship in their own church. The first plans for a parish in Kirchhörde were developed in 1937.

After World War II around 180 people gathered for services, first in the villa of the entrepreneur and politician Florian Klöckner. In 1948 a property was found on which to build a church. The architect was Alfred Kalmbacher, whose second design was approved in June 1951. The building was managed by St. Clemens. The new church was consecrated on 26 September 1954 by Franz Hengsbach. An organ was built in 1956 by Anton Feith.

== External ==
- Official website
