= Soest, Germany =

Soest
- Town
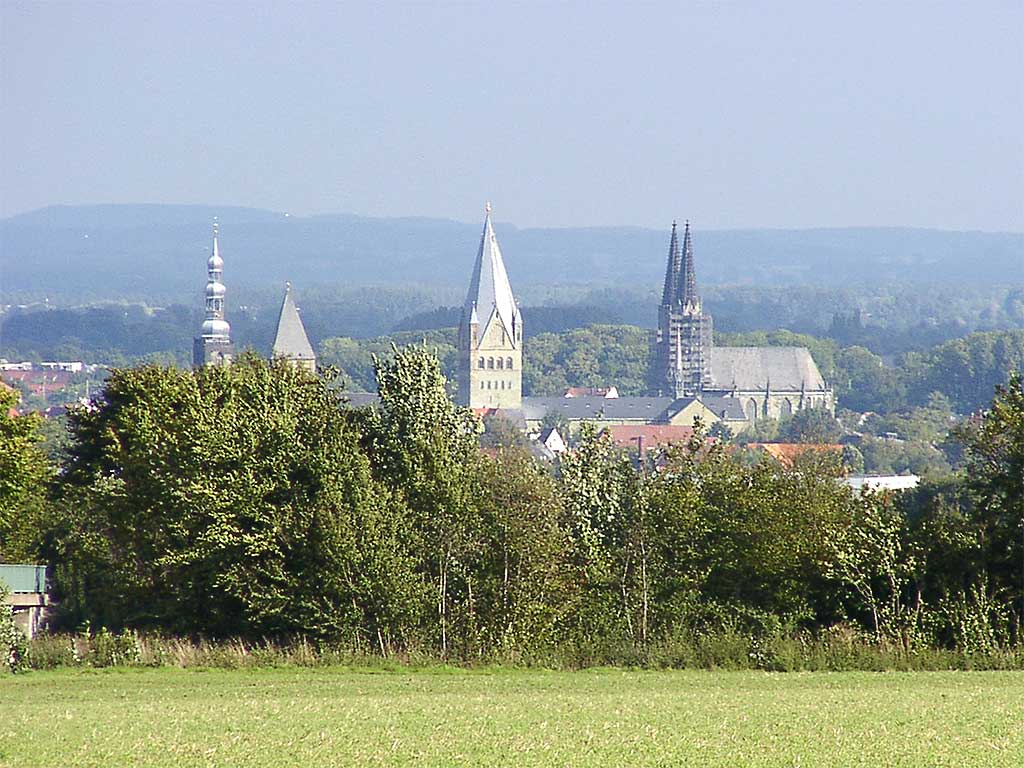
- Soest

- Flag Coat of arms

- Location of Soest within Soest district
- Interactive map of Soest
- Location within Germany Location within North Rhine-Westphalia
- Coordinates: 51°34′16″N 8°06′33″E
- Country: Germany
- State: North Rhine-Westphalia
- Admin. region: Arnsberg
- District: Soest
- Subdivisions: 19

Government
  - Mayor (2025–30): Marcus Schiffer (SPD)

Area
  - Total: 85.81 km^{2} (33.13 sq mi)
- Elevation: 90 m (300 ft)

Population (2025-12-31)
  - Total: 47,752
  - Density: 556.5/km^{2} (1,441/sq mi)
- Time zone: UTC+01:00 (CET)
  - Summer (DST): UTC+02:00 (CEST)
- Postal codes: 59494
- Dialling codes: 02921
- Vehicle registration: SO
- Website: www.soest.de

Soest (German pronunciation: [ˈzoːst], as if it were 'Sohst'; Westphalian: Saust) is a city in North Rhine-Westphalia, in western Germany. It is the capital of the Soest district.

== Geography ==
Soest is located along the Hellweg road, approximately 23 kilometres (14 miles) south-west of Lippstadt, roughly 50 km (31 mi) east of Dortmund and roughly 50 km (31 mi) west of Paderborn.

=== Neighbouring places ===
- Bad Sassendorf
- Ense
- Lippetal
- Möhnesee
- Werl
- Welver

== Legends ==
The Norwegian Þiðrekssaga from the 13th century, a series of tales about the Gothic King Theoderic the Great, identifies Soest (called Susat) as the capital of Attila's (?–453) Hunnic Empire. The actual location of Attila's capital has not been determined.

== History ==
=== Early history ===
Owing to its fertile soil (predominantly brown silty clay loam), the area around Soest is believed to have been settled well before the village is first mentioned in the Dagobertsche Schenkung in 836. Excavations in recent decades have uncovered signs of habitation stretching back more than 4000 years. During the 11th and 12th centuries, Soest grew considerably, making it one of the largest towns in Westphalia with some 10,000 citizens. It was also, until 1609, an important member of the Hanseatic League.

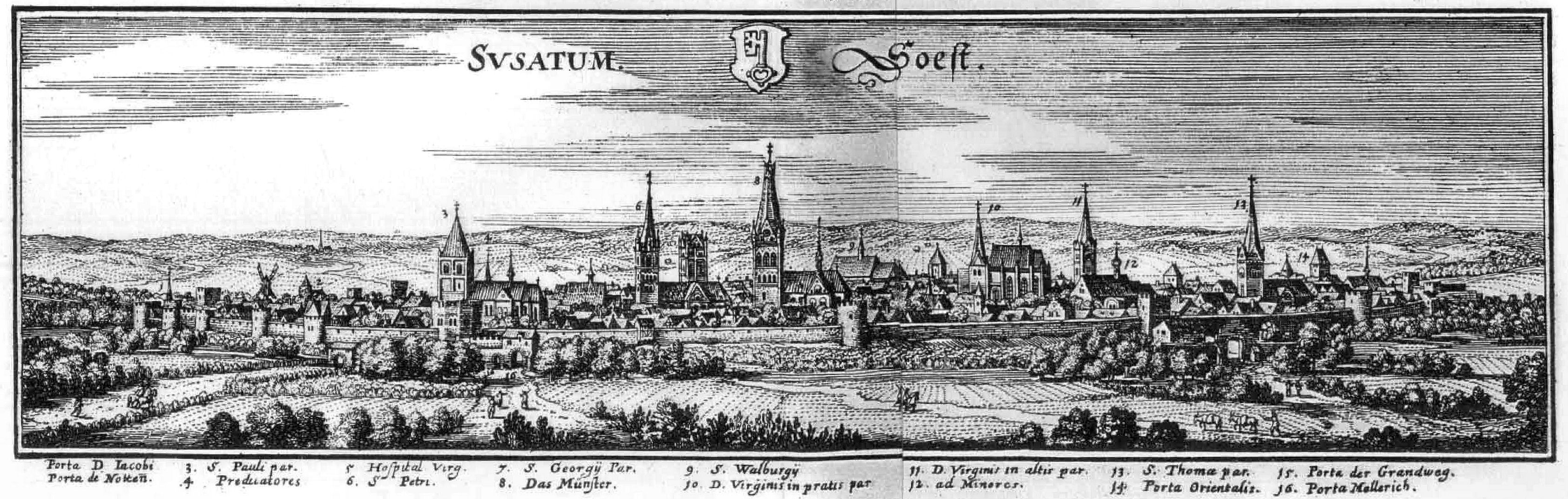
17th-century view of Soest

An increasingly confident and powerful Soest liberated itself, between 1444 and 1449, from the Bishop of Cologne, who controlled Westphalia (the so-called Soest Feud). No longer a capital of Westphalia, Soest aligned itself instead with the Duke of Cleves. This proved to be mostly a Pyrrhic victory, however. Though it had shown itself strong enough to defy the powerful Archbishop of Cologne, the town lost much of its trade as a consequence, with a "liberated" Soest surrounded by territories with other allegiances. When the last Duke of Cleves died in 1609, his dukedom was inherited by Brandenburg and, after a short siege, Soest was incorporated into it.

The painter Peter Lely, later to win fame in England, was born in 1618 in Soest to Dutch parents, where his father was an officer serving in the armed forces of Elector Johann Sigismund of Brandenburg.

During and after the Thirty Years' War, Soest suffered a tremendous loss of both population and influence; at its lowest point, in 1756, having merely 3,600 citizens. In the 1690s, a small commune of French Huguenots was founded in the town.

=== 19th to 21st centuries ===
With the creation of the Soest district in 1817, its influence again began to rise. However, the industrialization of the Ruhr area throughout the 19th century did not reach Soest, which remained a small town.

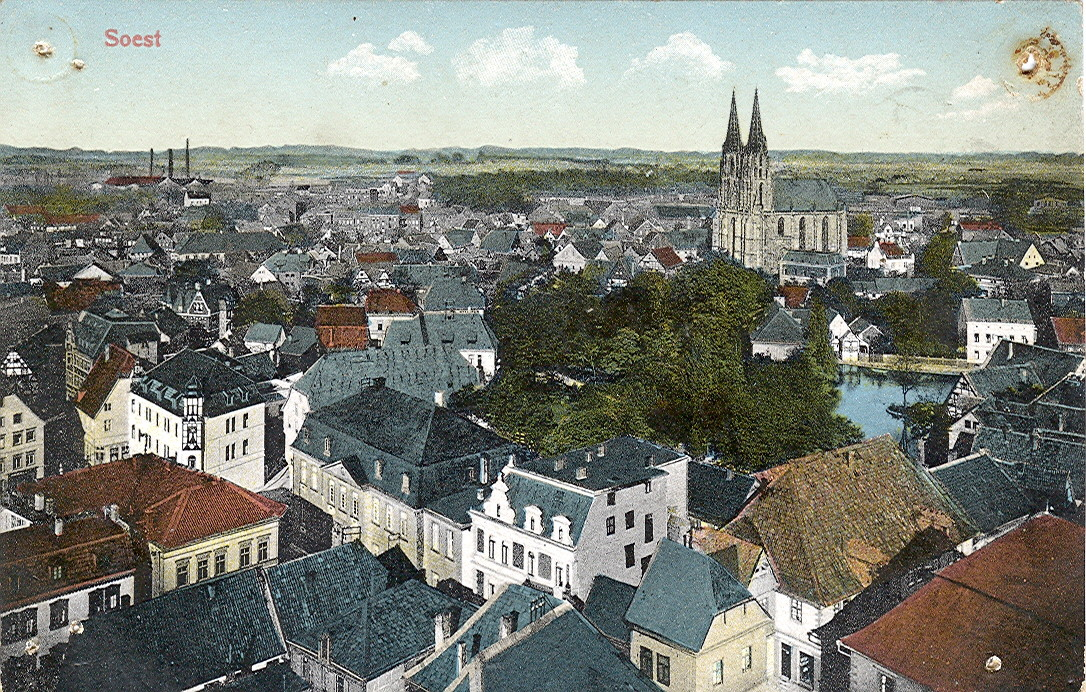
Postcard from c. 1914

Under the re-drawing of political borders within the Reich by the Nazi Party Soest was placed in Gau Westphalia-South. During World War II, the Stalag VI-E prisoner-of-war camp for Polish, French, Belgian and British POWs was operated in the town. In 1945, an SS construction brigade was dispatched to the town, and its prisoners were mostly Poles and Soviets, but also Danes, French, Belgians and Dutch. Soest was the target of several allied bomber raids targeting the marshalling yard, one of the biggest in the Reich, and the important battery factory Akku Hagen. In early April 1945, Soest suffered from major fighting as Allied forces captured the town. Though retaken by a German counterattack shortly thereafter, destructive front-line combat continued to rage in Soest and its environs at the eastern edge of the Ruhr Pocket until the Allies, spearheaded by the U.S. Ninth Army, gained permanent control on April 7.

From 1953 to 1971, a sizable garrison of Canadian soldiers and their families was stationed at Soest (with the Canadian camps located just east of the town in Bad Sassendorf), as well as at Werl and Hemer-Iserlohn and Deilinghofen to the southwest. In addition, an American Nike Battery (66th Battalion) was situated just south of the town, and was subsequently turned over to the German military.

From 1971 to 1993, the former Canadian properties, including the Married Quarters along Hiddingser Weg, south of the B-1, were used and occupied by British military personnel and their families. With the eventual closure of the Belgian and British army facilities, many of these properties were re-purposed for civilian use, abandoned, or demolished. The former Married Quarters area was converted to civilian housing. The former CANEX (the Canadian Army's food and clothing store for NATO families) was converted to a NAAFI under the British and finally demolished in 2006.

== Population ==
Historical population

Year	Pop.	±% p.a.
1965	39,145	—
1970	39,845	+0.36%
1975	40,310	+0.23%
1980	40,792	+0.24%
1985	41,726	+0.45%
1990	42,602	+0.42%
1995	47,730	+2.30%

Year	Pop.	±% p.a.
2000	48,520	+0.33%
2005	48,534	+0.01%
2010	48,579	+0.02%
2015	47,974	−0.25%
2020	47,206	−0.32%
2025	47,752	+0.23%

Source: Landesdatabank Nordrhein-Westfalen

== Education ==
The city is home to a major branch of the South Westphalia University of Applied Sciences (also: Fachhochschule Südwestfalen (FH SWF)) which offers various engineering, and Business Administration programmes.

== Sights ==
Soest has a multitude of historical buildings and attractions. The many medieval churches are built from a greenish sandstone unique to this area.

=== St. Patroclus ===
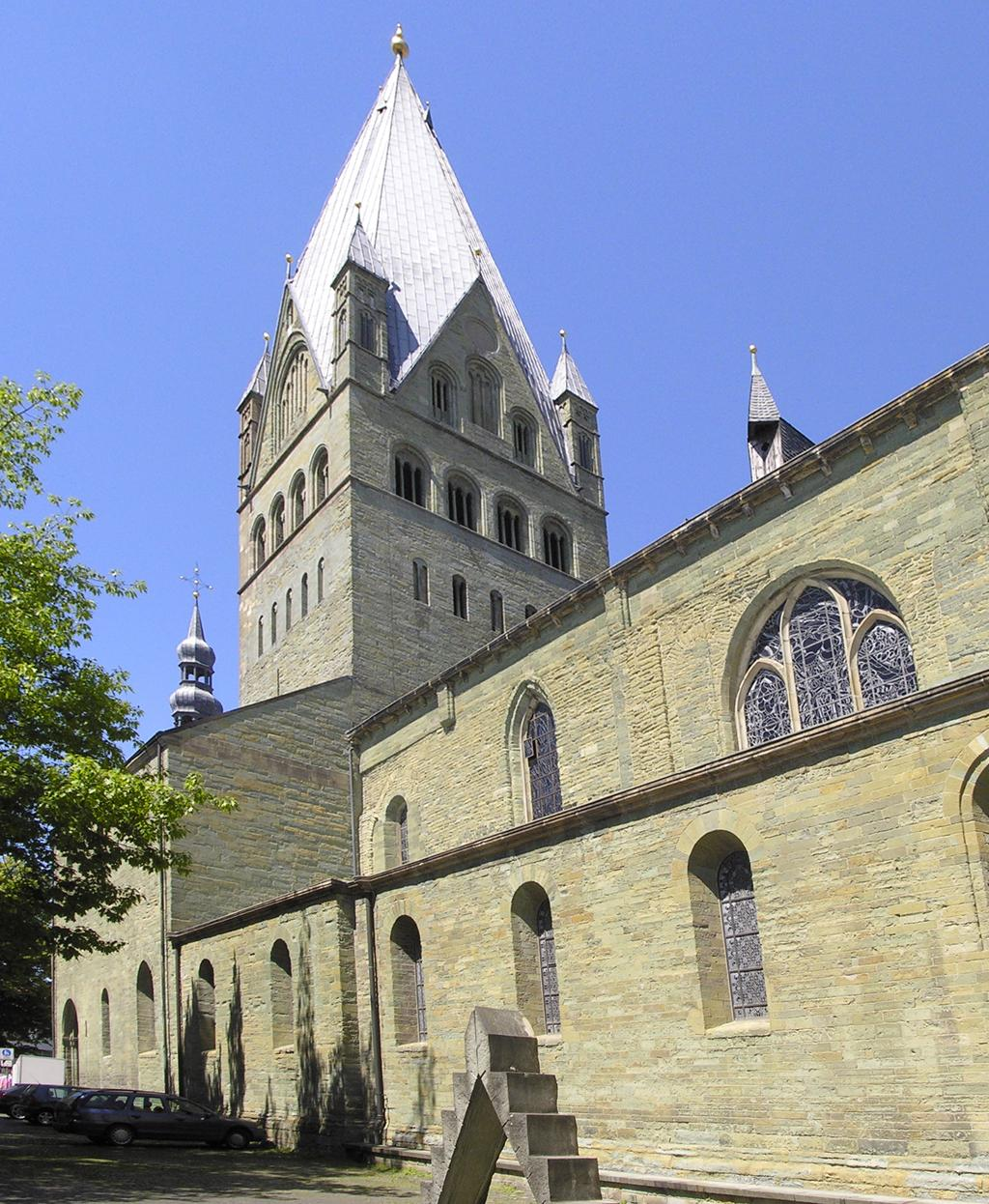
Church of St. Patrokli

In 960, Bruno I, Archbishop of Cologne transferred relics of St. Patroclus from Troyes to Soest. From 964 on, they have been housed in what became the provost church St.-Patrokli-Dom (St. Patroclus' "Cathedral"), a particularly fine example of Romanesque architecture.

The cathedral is an example of early medieval Romanesque architecture fashioned from the local greenish sandstone. Its massive squared bell tower or steeple can be seen for many kilometres, rising up out of the city centre of the old town and a landmark of the Soester Boerde.

=== Allerheiligenkirmes ===
The Allerheiligenkirmes is named for All Saints' Day as it starts every year at the first Wednesday after All Saints' and lasts for five days. It is Europe's biggest old town fair and was held for the 685th time in 2023.

=== Specialties of Soest ===
Among the traditional specialities of Soest are Möppken bread and pumpernickel. The Haverland bakery in the city centre, which formerly supplied dark bread to the royal court of Bavaria, has existed since 1570. A more recent speciality is Bullenauge (Bull's Eye), a mocha liqueur, sold mostly at the Allerheiligenkirmes. Another speciality is the Soester beer, also known as Zwiebel-Bier (Onion Beer) as it has been brewed, since 1993, in the Zwiebel (Onion) Inn.

== Coat of arms ==
The town's coat of arms shows a key, which is the symbol for Saint Peter, the patron saint of Cologne. The key symbol remained unchanged, even after Soest no longer fell within the jurisdiction of Cologne.

== Twin towns – sister cities ==
Soest is twinned with:

- Bangor, Wales
- Visby, Sweden
- Guérard, France
- Herzberg, Germany
- Kampen, Netherlands
- Sárospatak, Hungary
- Soest, Netherlands
- Strzelce Opolskie, Poland

== Notable people ==
- Johannes von Soest (1448–1506), composer, theorist and poet
- Johann Gropper (1503–1559), Catholic church politician of the Reformation period
- Peter Lely (1618–1680), Dutch-English painter.
- August Meineke (1790–1870), German classical scholar.
- Heinrich von Sybel (1817–1895), historian
- Otto Modersohn (1865–1943), landscape painter
- Sigfrid Henrici (1889–1964), army officer of armoured forces
- Wilhelm Jahn (1891–1952), SA general and police chief
- Ernst Krappe (1891–1977), lawyer and politician
- Wilhelm Morgner (1891–1917), Expressionist painter
- August Müller (1895–1960), member of parliament (CDU)
- Helmut Bertram (1910–1981), politician
- Hartwig Bleidick (born 1944), footballer
- Ralf König (born 1960), known comic book creator
- Heinrich Frieling (born 1985), politician
- Sascha Schmitz (born 1972), singer-songwriter and actor
- Sebastian Hille (born 1980), footballer
- Oliver Kirch (born 1982), footballer
- Michael Lejan (born 1983), footballer
- Rebecca Handke (born 1986), pair skater
- Gaëtan Bille (born 1988), Belgian cyclist
- Julian Büscher (born 1993), footballer

== Gallery ==
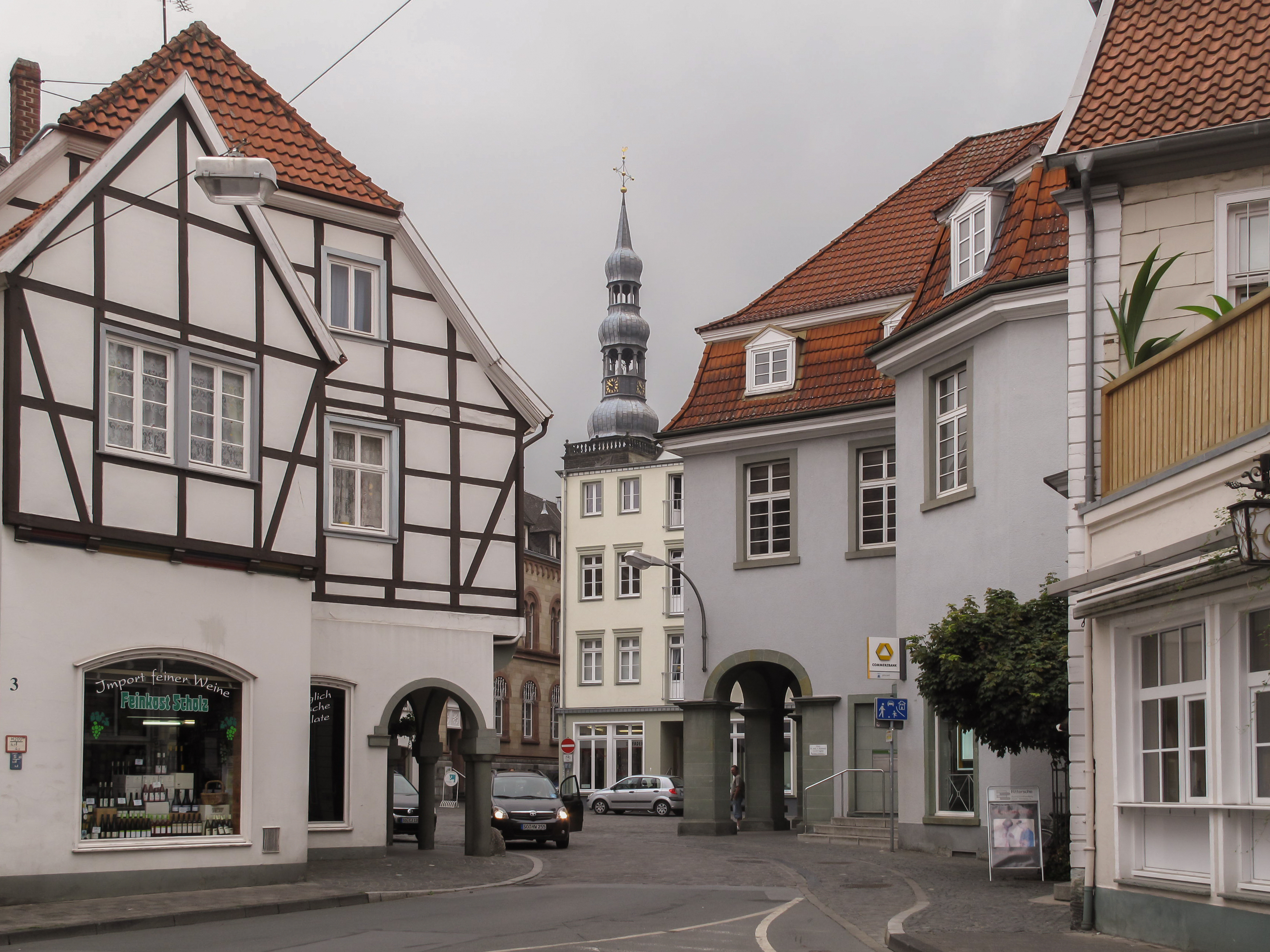
Soest, view to a street

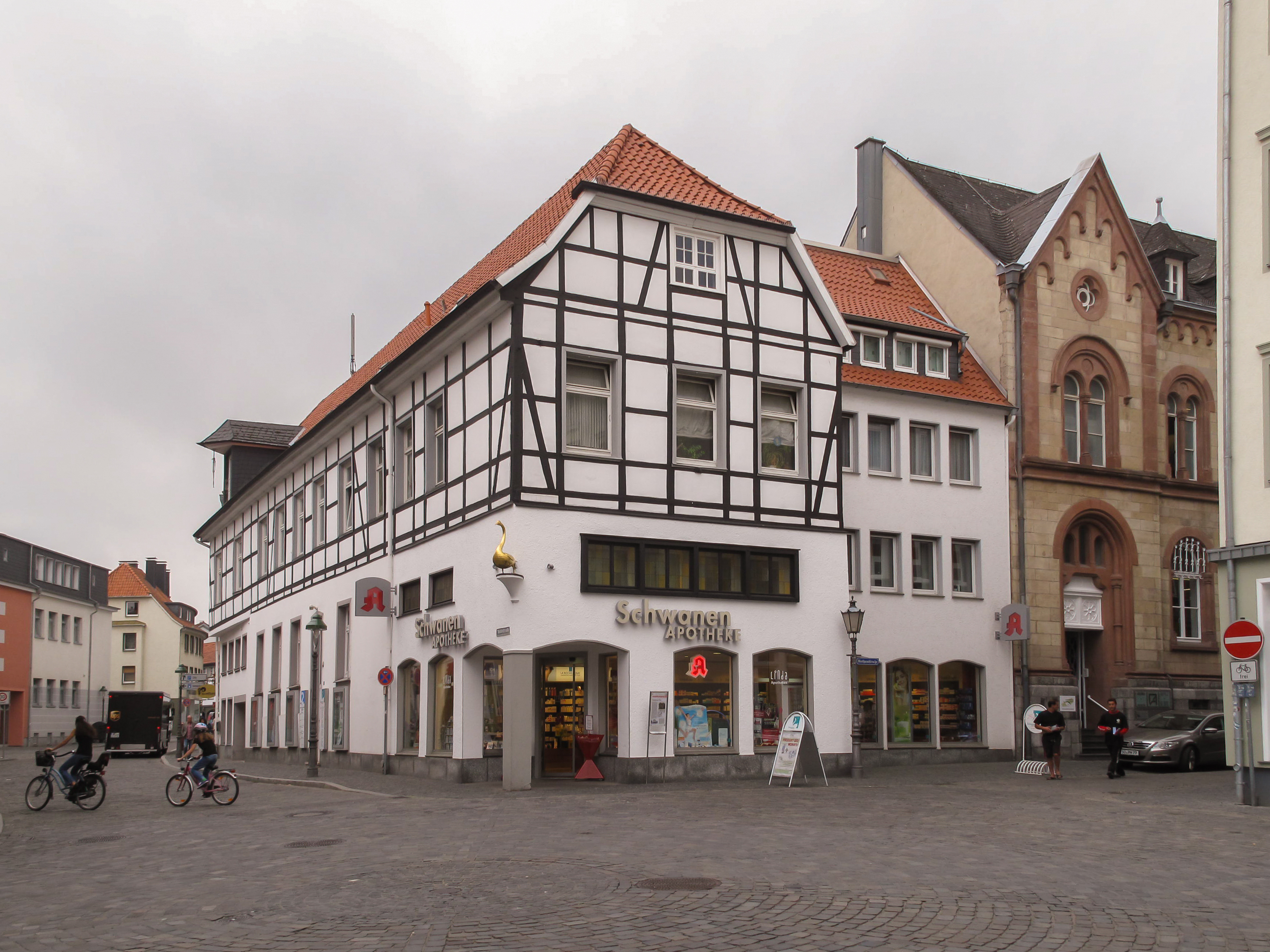
Soest, view to a street

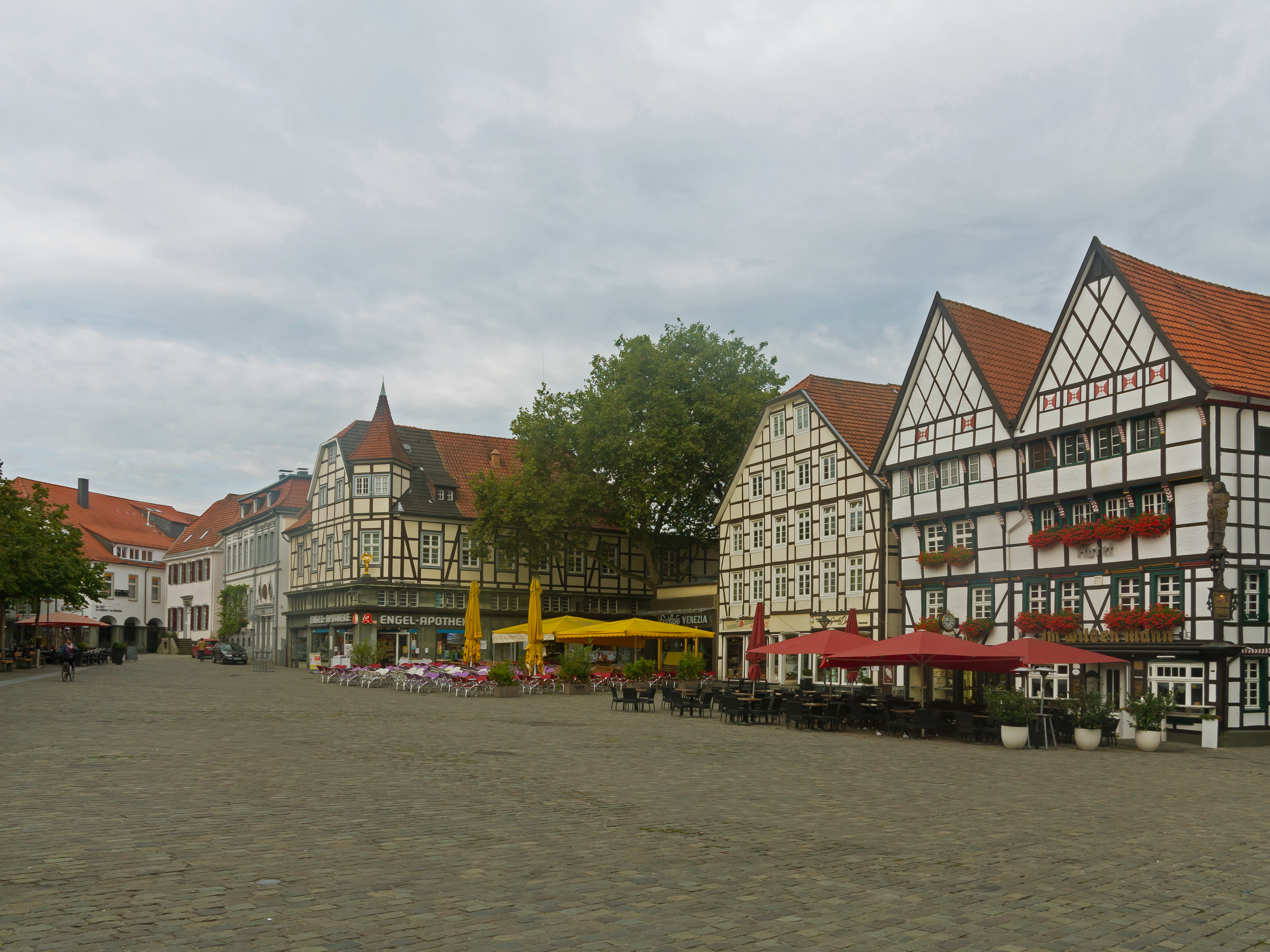
Soest, view to a street
