= Patrocles (half-brother of Socrates) =

Athenian of the Classical period

Patrocles (Ancient Greek: Πατροκλῆς) was an Athenian of the Classical period, known chiefly for being the half‐brother of the philosopher Socrates. Patrocles was King Archon of the board of ten oligarchs who replaced the Thirty Tyrants after their downfall.

== Biography ==
Patrocles was born in Athens during the 5th century BC. He was the son of Phaenarete, the mother of Socrates and a midwife of some renown in Athens, and Chaeredemus, her second husband. In 415 BC, a Patrocles (believed to be Socrates' half-brother) was one of seven who fled into exile as a result of the scandals and failed oligarchic coup of that year. He later returned to Athens and held an official position in the Athenian treasury, being Archon basileus of the board of ten oligarchs.

== See also ==
- Socrates
- Phaenarete
