= Patroclus of Bourges =

Saint Patroclus of Bourges (c. 496–576) was a Merovingian ascetic, who was a native of the province of Berry, France. A deacon at Bourges, he withdrew to become a hermit.

== Life ==
In his childhood Patroclus guarded sheep while his older brother, Antonius, pursued an education. Eventually, his parents allowed him to go to school. He continued his education under Nunnion, a man greatly esteemed by King Childebert.

In his Historia Francorum, Gregory of Tours writes that Patroclus became a deacon at Bourges in his youth. He was so absorbed in prayer that he did not appear at the table for meals with the other clergy, which annoyed the archdeacon, who felt it unseemly that he did share meals with those with whom he shared ecclesiastical responsibilities.

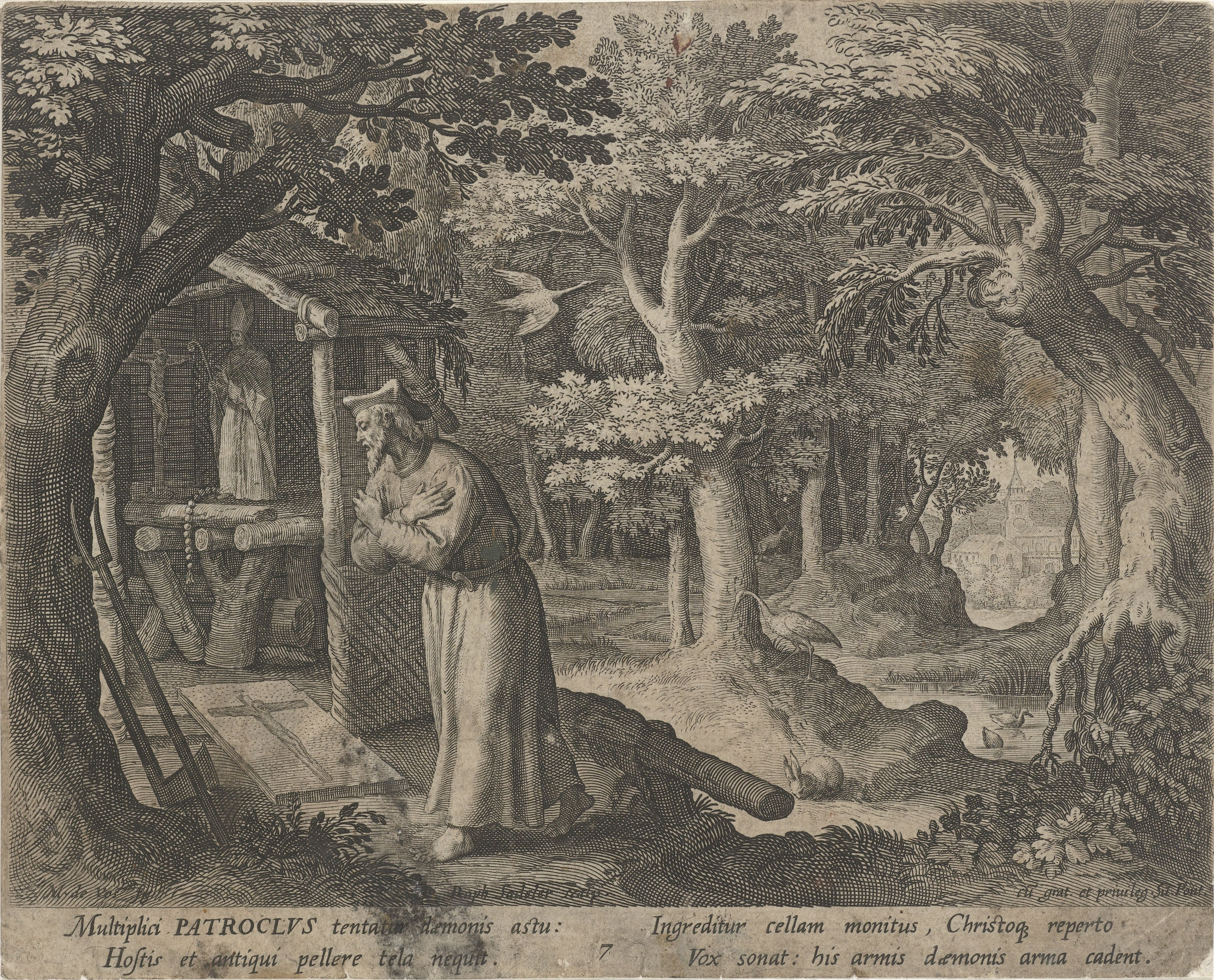
Patroclus at Néris

Patroclus withdrew to Néris, where he built a small chapel dedicated to Martin of Tours and began to teach the children. The sick came to him and were cured. His virtue becoming conspicuous, he resolved to retreat to greater solitude; but first he established a small monastic community for women.

Patroclus built himself a cell in a place called Moichant. He would drink nothing stronger than water that had been sweetened with honey. He ate only bread, water, and salt, and devoted long periods to prayer, being credited with healing powers. In this place he restored health to an enormous number of possessed people by the imposition of his hands and the sign of the cross.

Later, he built a monastery at Colombier and served as its first abbot. He died at La Celle, aged eighty years old, and was buried at the monastery. His tomb became a destination of pilgrimages.

Patroclus is a patron saint of cattle. He is commemorated in the Roman Catholic Church on November 18; in the Orthodox Church on November 17.
