= Patroclus of Troyes =

Christian martyr from Troyes, Gaul (c. 259)

Saint Patroclus of Troyes
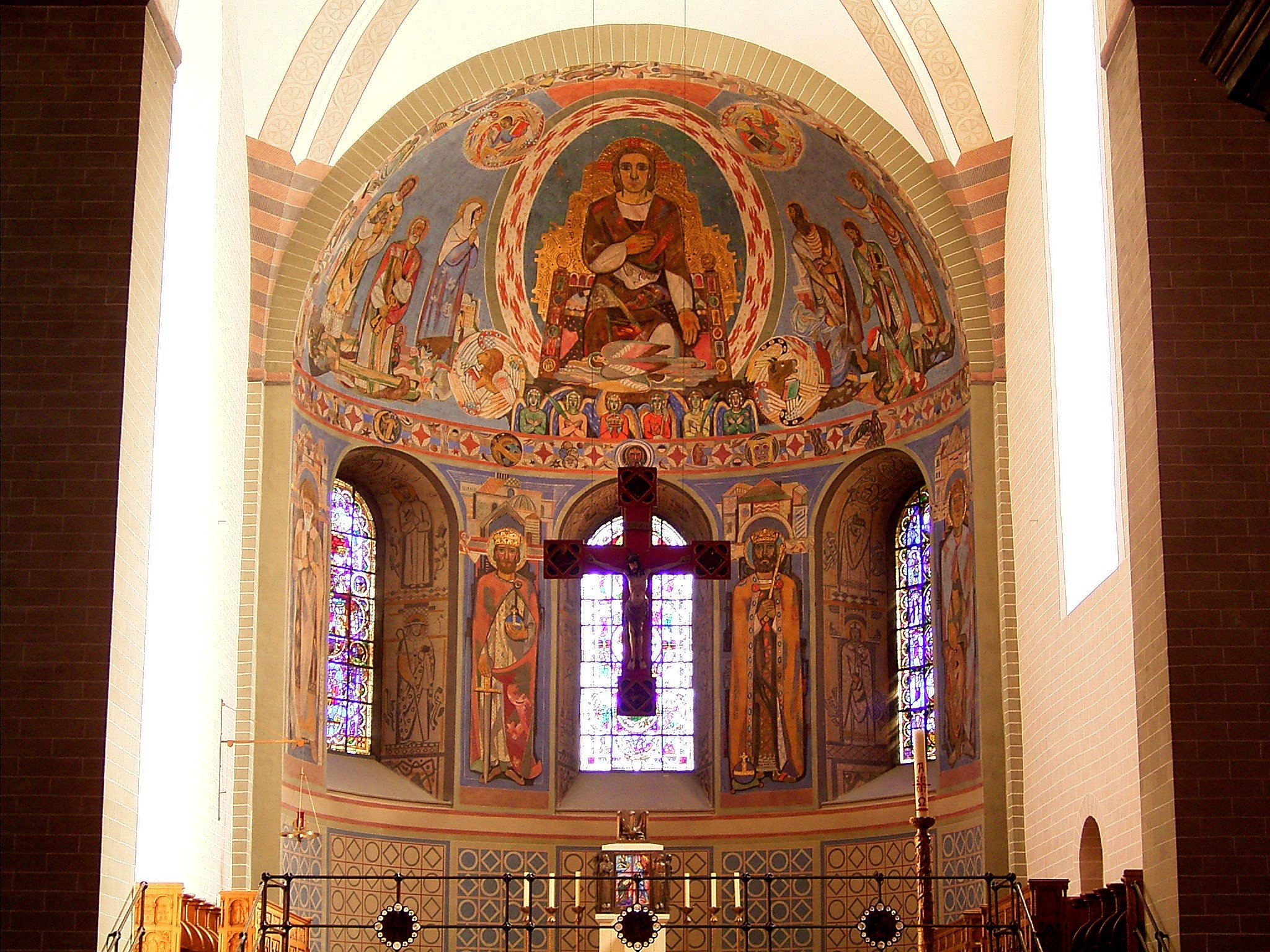
- Born: Troyes
- Died: c. 259 AD; Troyes
- Venerated in: Roman Catholic Church, Orthodox Church
- Feast: January 21 (Roman Catholic), August 17 (Eastern Orthodox)
- Attributes: depicted as a warrior pointing to a fish with a pearl in its mouth
- Patronage: invoked against demons and fever

Saint Patroclus (Patroccus; French: Parre, German: Patroklus) of Troyes was a Christian martyr who died around 259 AD.

== Life ==
Patroclus was a wealthy aristocrat of the city of Tricassinum (now Troyes). His parents had left him a substantial estate just outside the city, where he led a pious Christian life. He was noted for his charity and for this the Lord bestowed upon him the gift of wonderworking.

He is said to have converted Sabinian of Troyes. Patroclus was probably beheaded under Emperor Valerian.

== Passio ==
His passion story is in many parts an adoption of the Passio of Symphorianus of Autun.

The "Passio sancti Patrocli Trecensis" attributes Patroclus's death to the Emperor Aurelian. When Patroclus refused to worship the Roman gods, the emperor ordered him taken to water and there beheaded, so that his body might not rest in peace on dry land. The guards brought him to the River Seine, but their eyes were clouded and Patroclus managed to briefly escape across the river. The guards argued over whether their captive had been delivered by his god or through magic. Patroclus was subsequently recaptured and beheaded at Troyes.

Two old beggars who often received alms from Patroclus collected the body and watched over it until evening. Then Eusebius, the archpriest of that place, and the deacon Liberius came by night, wrapped the body in linen, and buried it discreetly. They then kept vigil with the two old men.

== Veneration ==
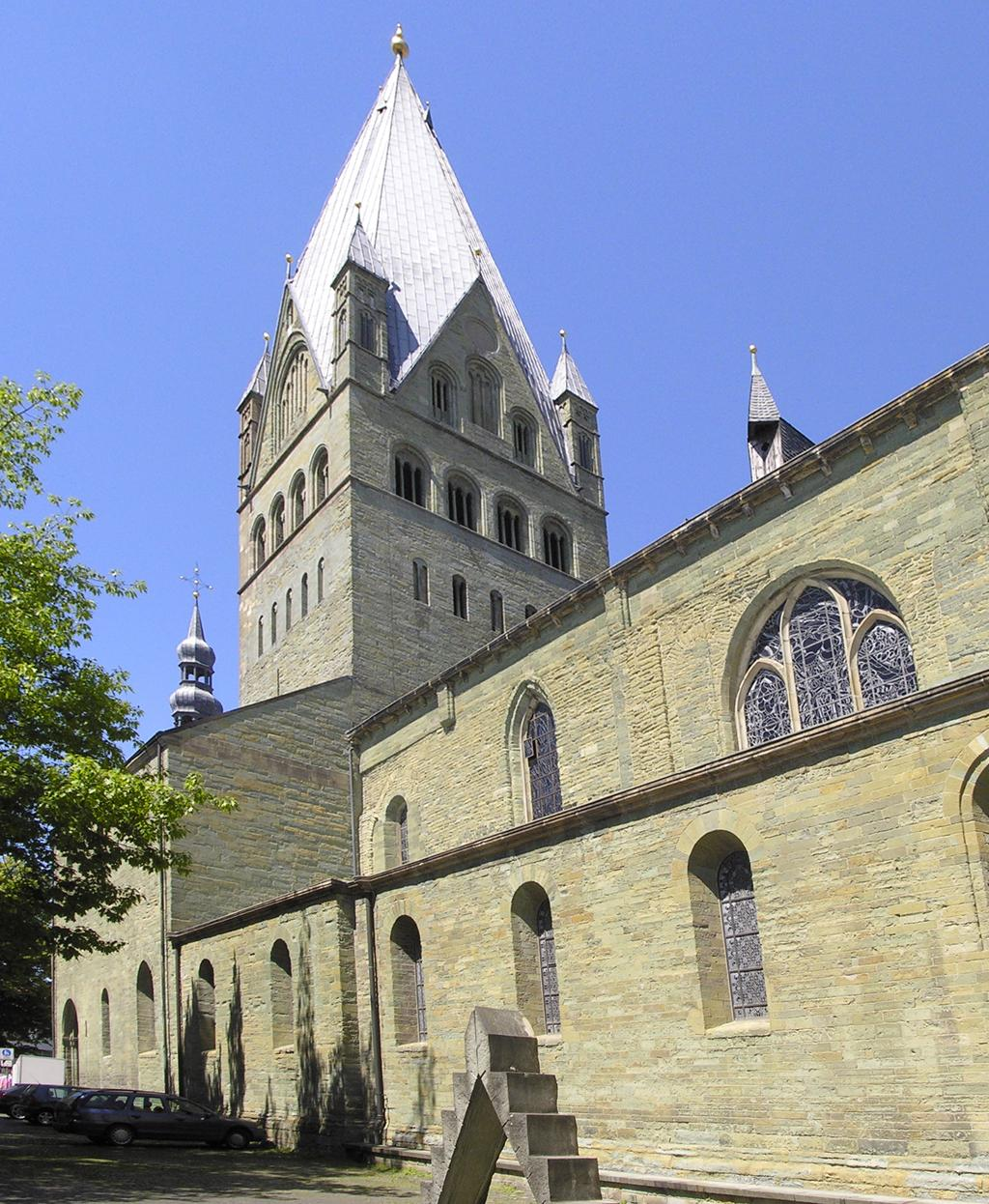
St. Patrokli, Soest in Westphalia, Germany

Gregory of Tours recounts that a small chapel was built over the saint's grave at Saint-Parres-aux-Tertres.

Bruno I, Archbishop of Cologne transported Patroclus' relics from Troyes to Cologne in 962, and transferred them in 964 to Soest, Germany, where they are held in the church St. Patrokli, dedicated to the saint. Patroclus is the patron saint of Soest, where there is a polychrome statue of the saint in the central part of the façade of the townhall.

In art, Patroclus is depicted as a warrior pointing to a fish with a pearl in its mouth, often invoked against demons and fever.

His feast day is January 21.
