= St. Patrokli, Soest =

Roman Catholic parish and church in Soest, Germany

Coordinates: 51°34′18″N 8°06′30″E

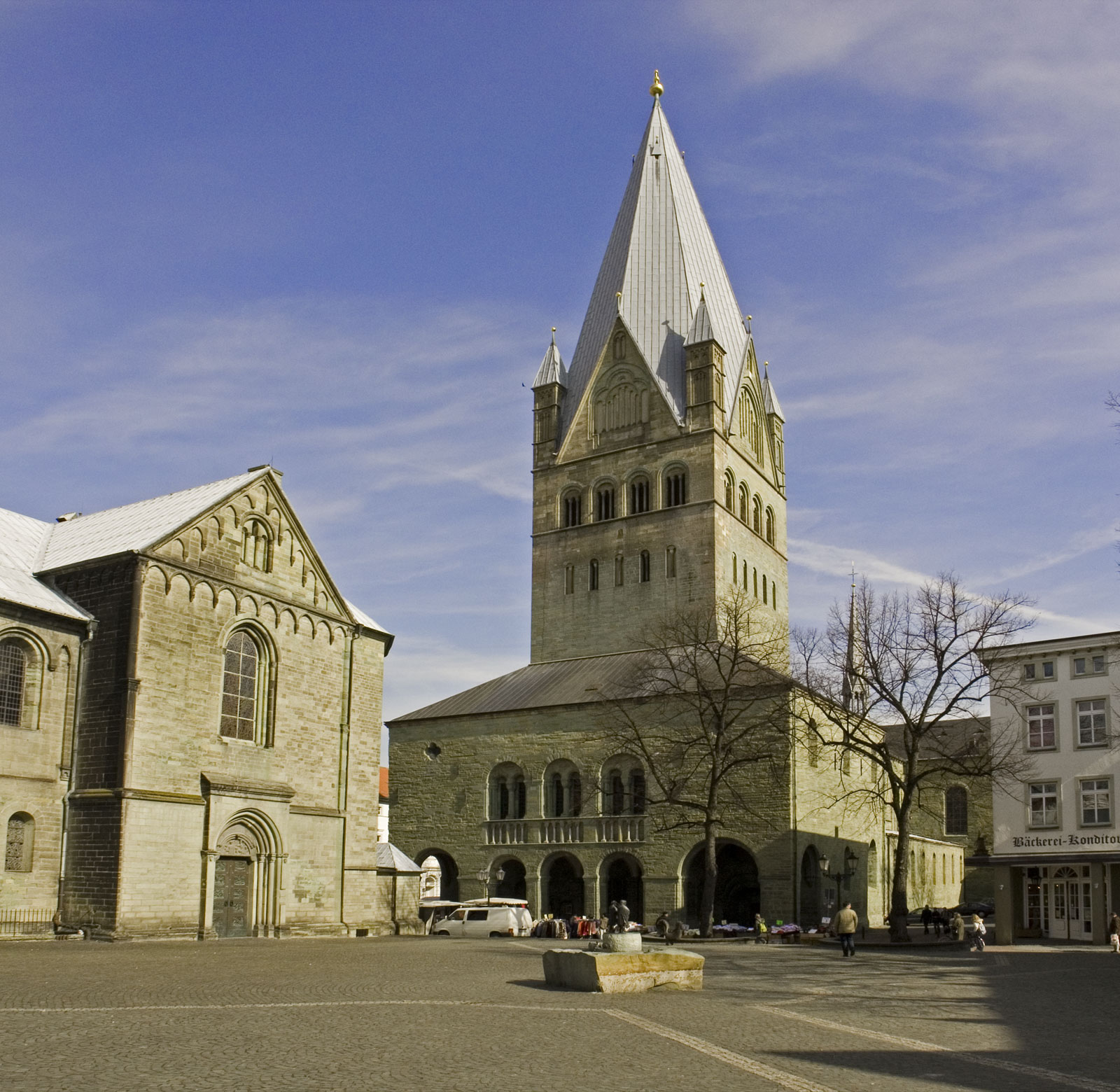
The front

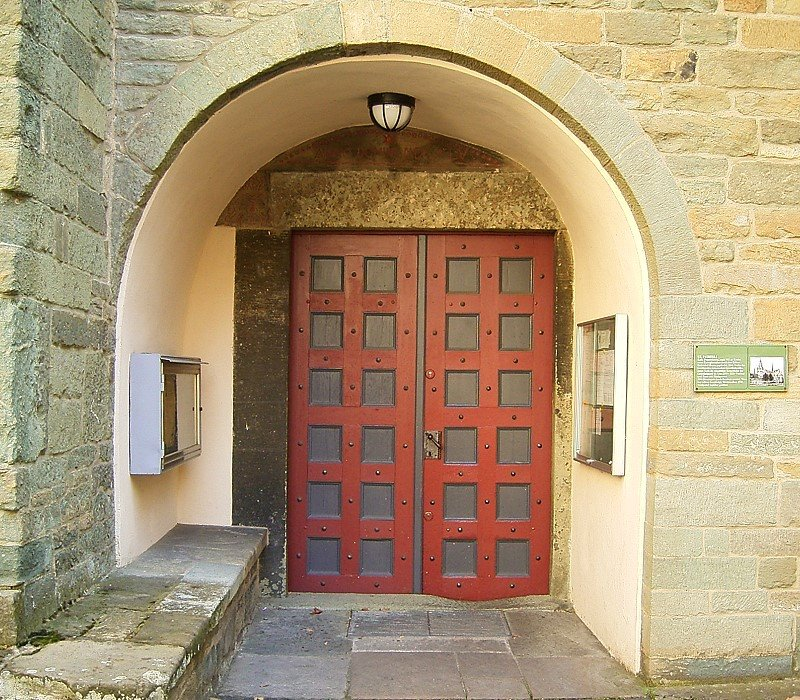
Southern entrance

St. Patrokli is a Roman Catholic parish and church in Soest, Germany. The church is of great significance in the history of architecture as it is the epitome of Romanesque architecture in Westphalia. As a result, it is known as St.-Patrokli-Dom (St. Patroclus' "Cathedral"). It holds relics of its patron saint Patroclus of Troyes from 954. It was the church of the canonical foundation of St. Patroclus, which existed from the 10th century until its abolition in 1812. Since 1823 the church has been the parish church of the St. Patrokli parish in the diocese of Paderborn. In 1859 it was promoted to the rank of provost church.

== Building ==
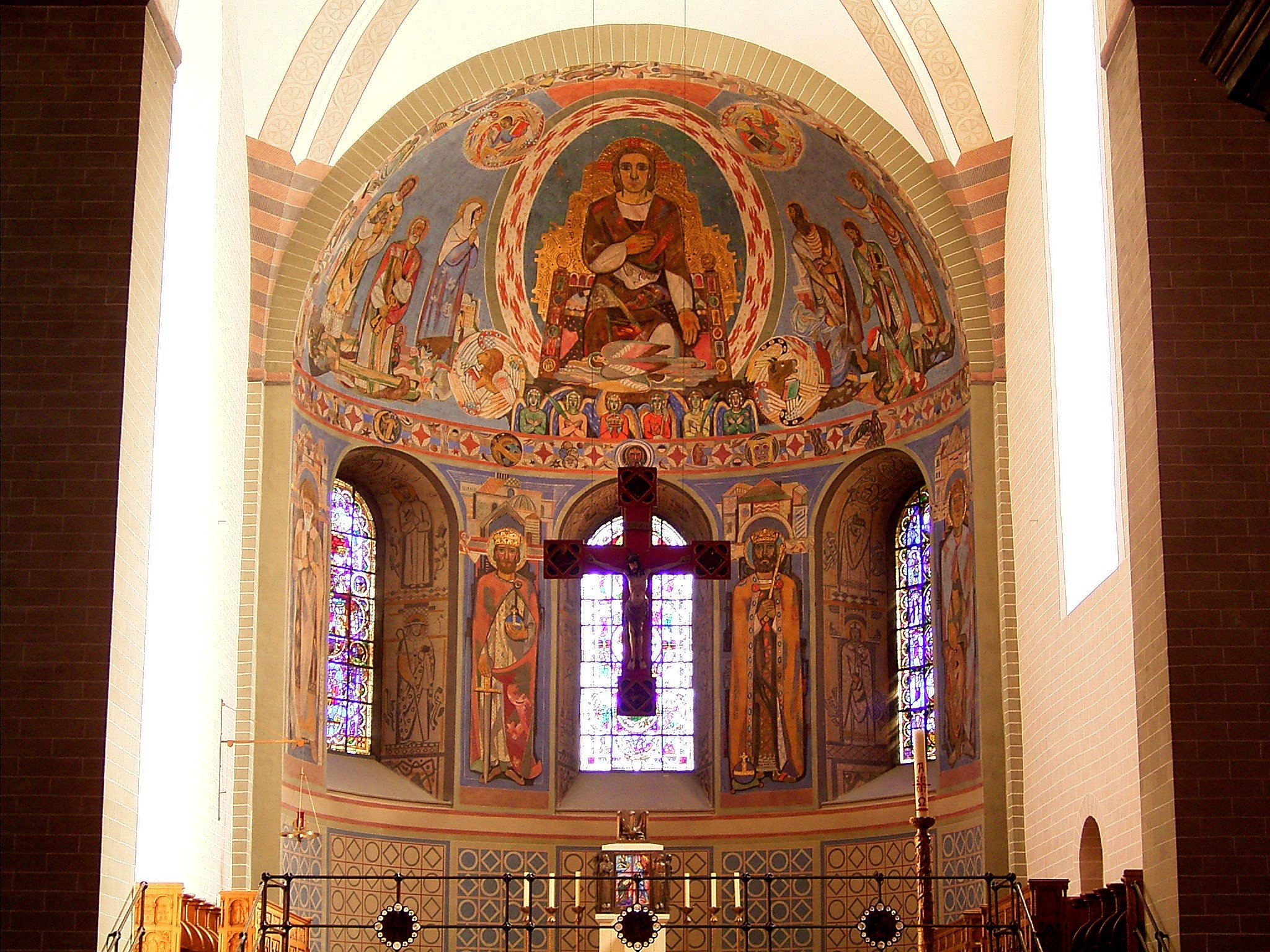
1954 apse following the High Middle Ages model

The church was originally a basilica consecrated to St. Stephen and it had two turrets which were destroyed by fire. One can see traces of these towers even now. Today, the building's great green sandstone mass is impressive, but the most notable feature of the building is its 80-metre tall tower with four smaller turrets on its corners, which is often singled out by experts as the most beautiful Romanesque tower in Germany. The tower is called colloquially Turm Westfalens (Tower of Westphalia). The spacious forehall with loggia is another highlight. This once formed a connection from the modern church square. The tower was under municipal ownership until the beginning of the 19th century and served as the municipal armoury (today it is the church Museum). Some of the military artefacts (crossbow bolts) can now be seen in the museum of the Osthofentor.

The painting of the main apse with a modified version of the Christ Pantokrator motif was carried out by the painter Peter Hecker in 1954, after the "oldest and most extensive" apse memorial to survive from Westphalia was destroyed in the Second World War.

== Building history ==
=== Middle Ages ===
Crypt

The original building (Building I), with a monumental westwerk, was completed before 1000. In the first half of the 11th century, the westwerk was rebuilt after a fire (Building II). The knight Walther, brother of Anno II, Archbishop of Cologne, was buried in the crypt in 1075. In the course of a further building phase (Building III), the vaulted aisles were erected, with St. Andrew's Chapel on the northern aisle. At the same time, the transepts were expanded, the westwerk was rebuilt as well as a secondary crypt and a sacristy was and an attached cloister were added to the south transept. The altar was consecrated on 11 July 1118 by Archbishop Frederick I. St. Stephen's chapel was consecrated in 1149.

In a further phase of construction (Building IV) a large hall crypt, the apse and a vaulted choir were installed. The Mary choir, the paradise and the East cloister were also built. The nave and the transepts were vaulted and the whole interior received painted decoration. This phase of construction ended with the reconsecration of the church by Archbishop Rainald of Dassel (r. 1159–1167) in 1166. The western portion of the building was rebuilt from the last quarter of the 12th century and into the 13th century. The old westwerk was made to appear part of the nave by the removal of supports, partitioning, and the installation of new vaulting in the last one and a half bays. Master Sigefridus of Soest spent the years between 1313 and 1340 creating the silver-gilt shrine of St. Patroclus.

=== Modern times ===
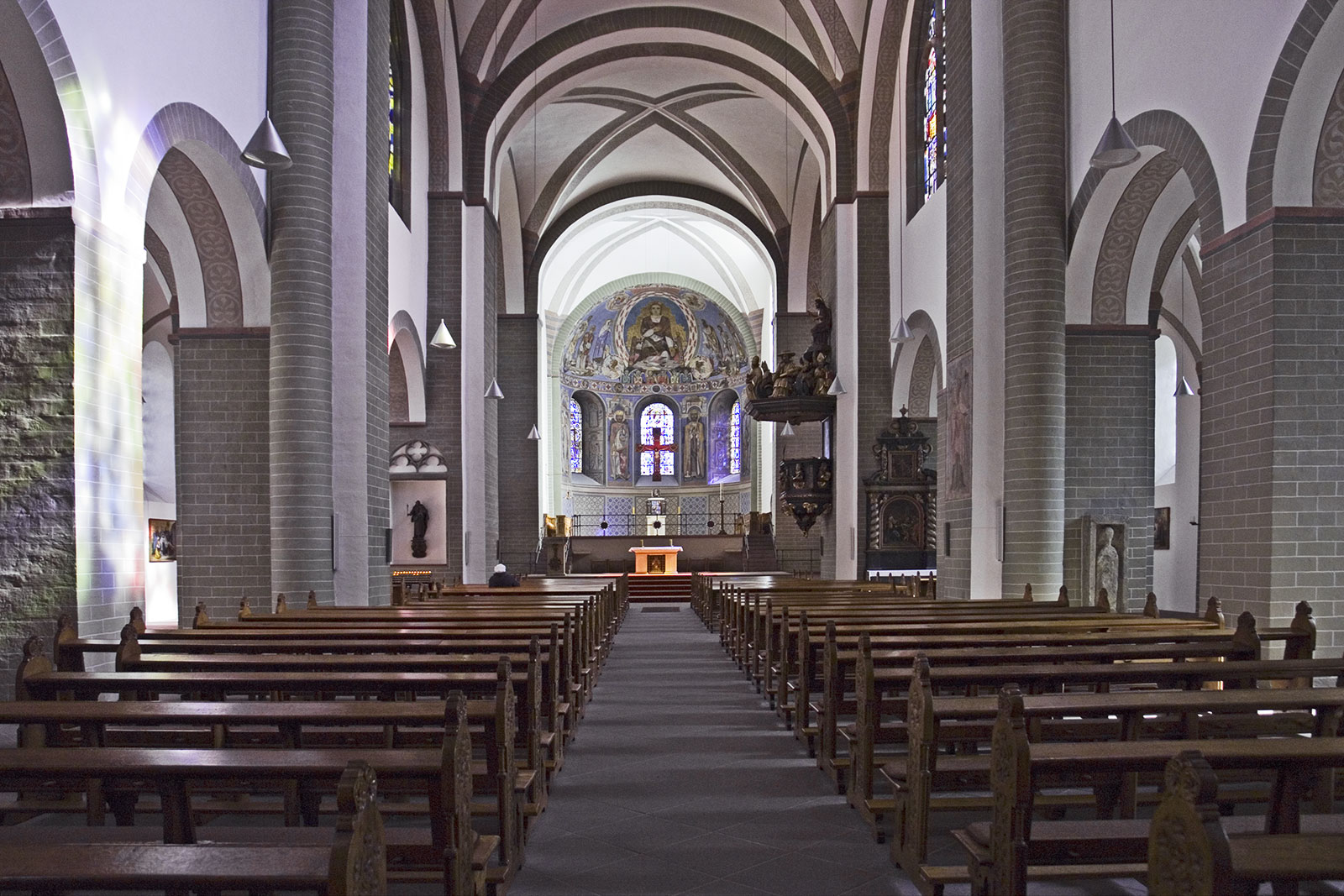
Nave

The crypt was blown up in 1817. During an aerial attack in 1944, the north side of the westwerk and vaults were severely damaged. In the aerial attacks of 1945, the organ was destroyed, the apse was obliterated and there was severe damage to the spire and vaulting. The reconstruction began with the laying of the groundstone in 1949. By 1954, a new high altar had been erected, and the vaults and apse had been repainted. The southern cloister and the eastern and southern wings were renovated. The local painter Hans Kaiser created windows for the westwerk and secondary crypt.

== Treasures ==
=== High choir and high altar ===
The high choir is decorated with wall and ceiling paintings. It is dominated by a very large red double cross. The simple high altar was placed between the stairs to the high choir. The 1871 shrine of St Patroclus, containing the remains of the saint have stood below.

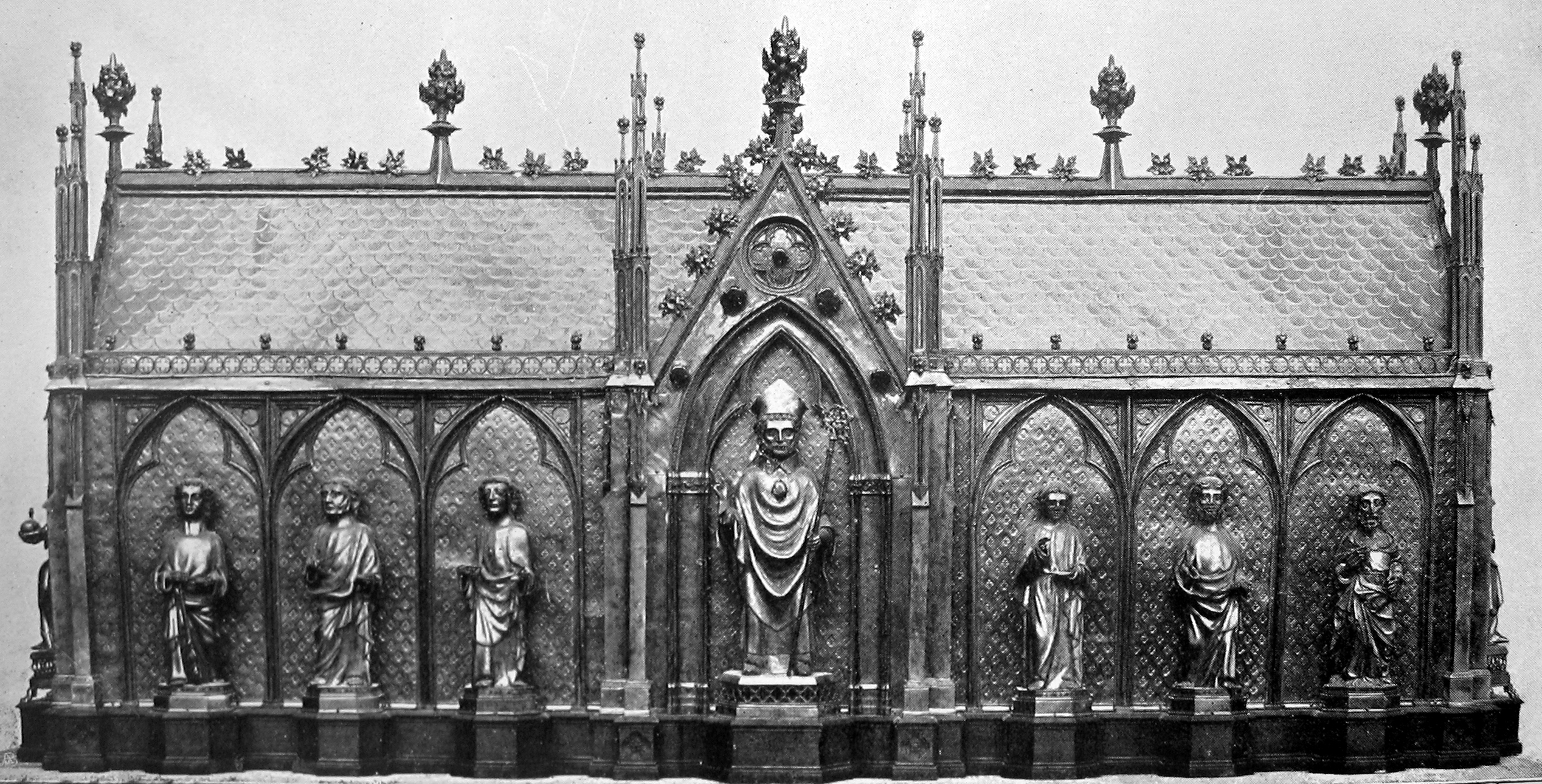
Sigefridus' Shrine of Patroclus, a reliquary chasse, made in Soest, 1311–1330

The Shrine of Patroclus, created between 1311 and 1330 by Master Sigefridus was sold to the Berlin Museum in 1841 and was lost in 1945 in the burning of the Friedrichshain bunker in Berlin. A few parts were saved or stolen before the fire and several of these including a statue dating from 1340 are today in the Bode Museum.

=== Rex in Gloria ===
Rex in Gloria was a painting created around 1200. The painting, which dominated the church, was 5.3 metres (17 ft) high and 3.9 metres (13 ft) metres wide. It depicted Christ on a golden throne, his right hand in a gesture of blessing and his left hand holding a book. Above in Romanesque majuscule was written SI DILIGITIS ME MANDATA MEA SERVATE (If you love me, obey my commands). This work was destroyed in an aerial attack on 7 March 1945.

=== Statue of Patroclus ===
On a column between the round arches of the organ loft on the west side is a statue of Patroclus. He wears a suit of armour, bears the Imperial Eagle on his shield and has his sword drawn, ready to serve as protector of the order and the city. Patroclus of Troyes was beheaded in 275 under Emperor Valerian, because he refused to sacrifice to the Roman gods. In the Catholic church he is venerated as a martyr. His feast day is 21 January.

=== Mary choir ===
In the Mary choir there are romanesque wall paintings from the second half of the 12th century. The paintings show Mary with the baby Jesus, as well as the Three Kings and Jesus' grandparents Saint Anne and Joachim.

== Organ ==
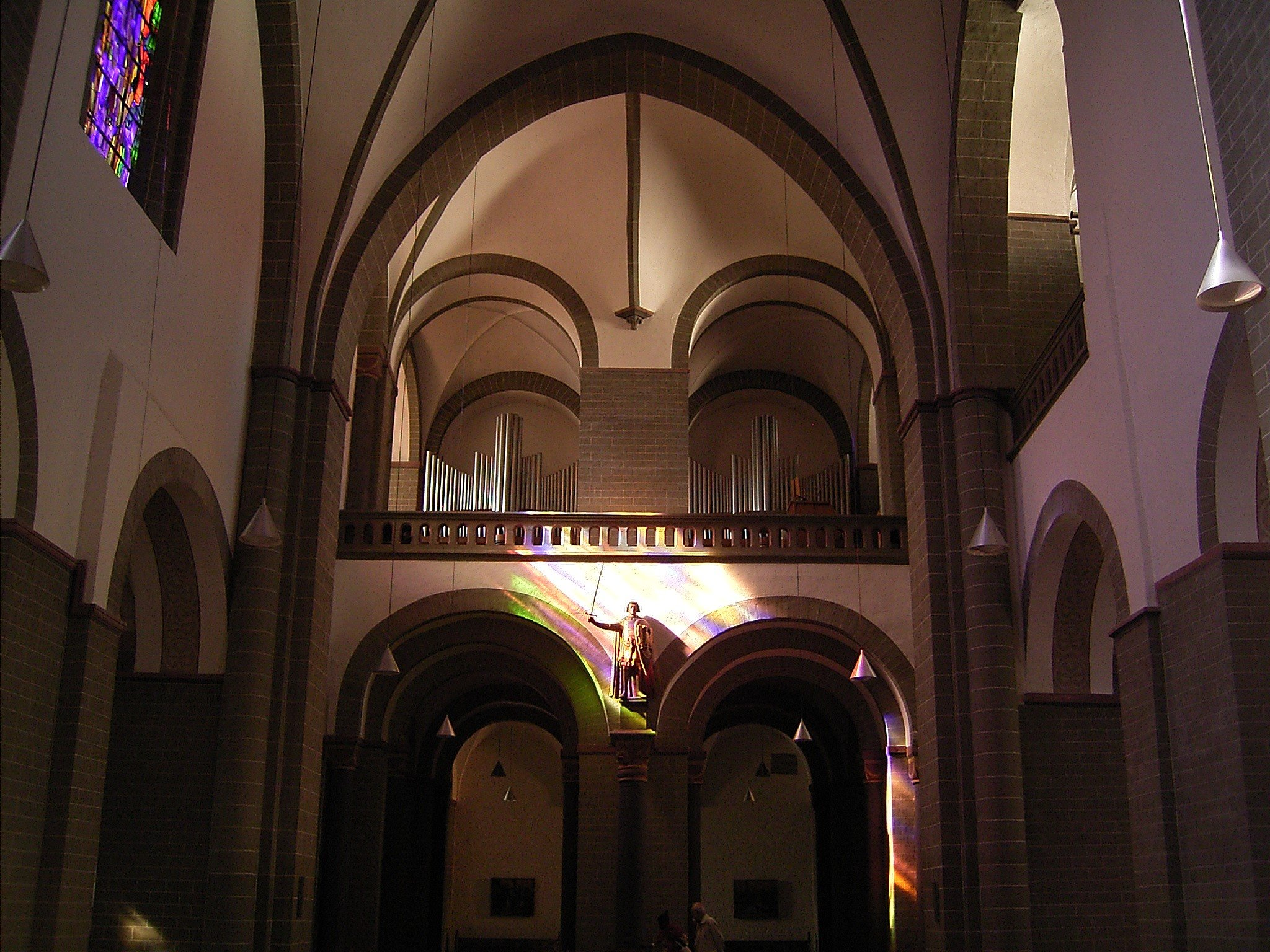
View of the organ

The organ was installed in St. Patrokli in 1967 by the organ firm Anton Feith (Paderborn) and was enlarged in the course of the church restorations of 1976–1977 to include a bombardwork and a 32-foot (9.8 m) bourdon. The instrument was comprehensively cleaned in 2005. The organ has cone chests and silder chests.

== Bells ==
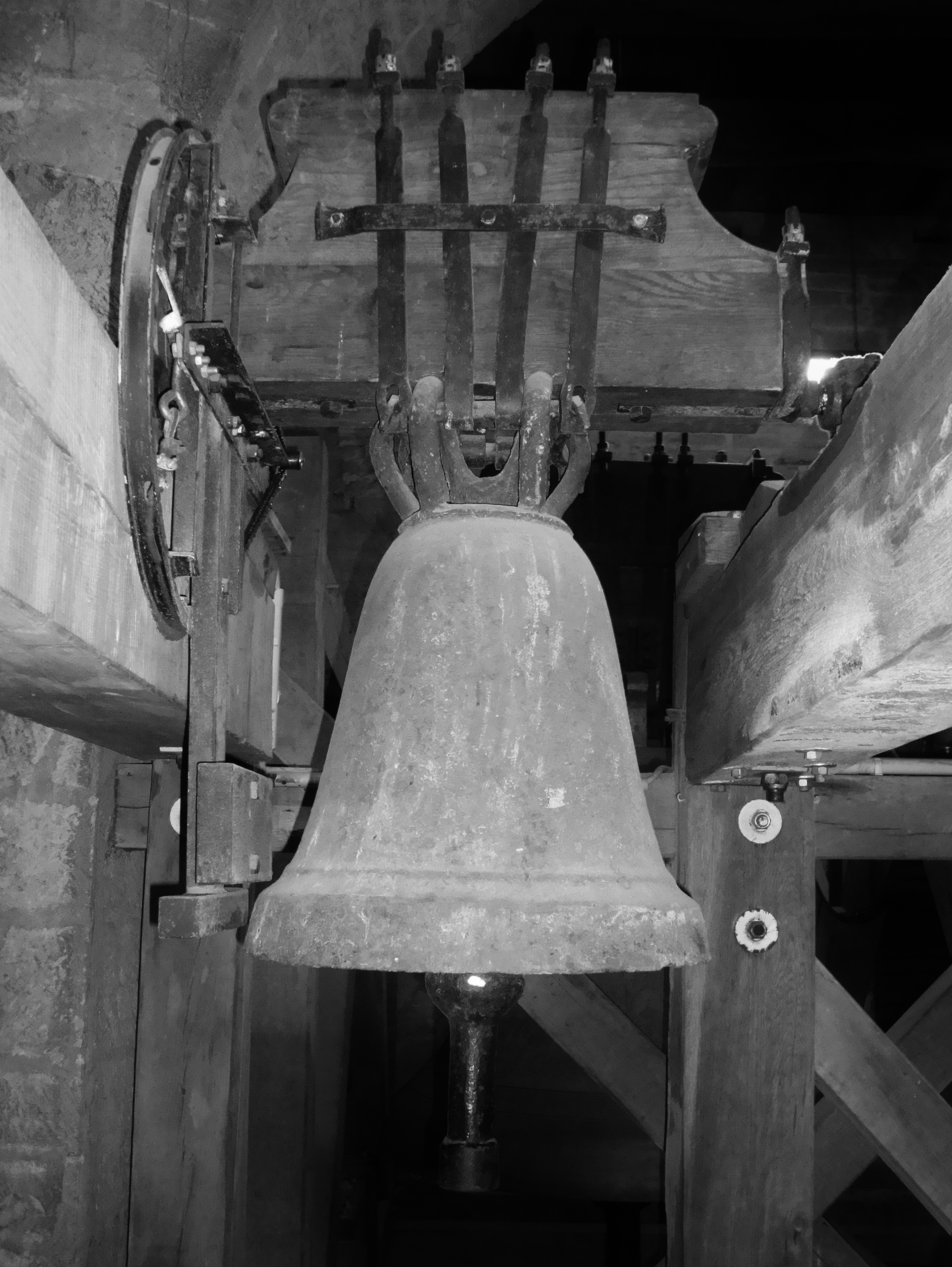
Little Angelic Bell, end of the 12th century

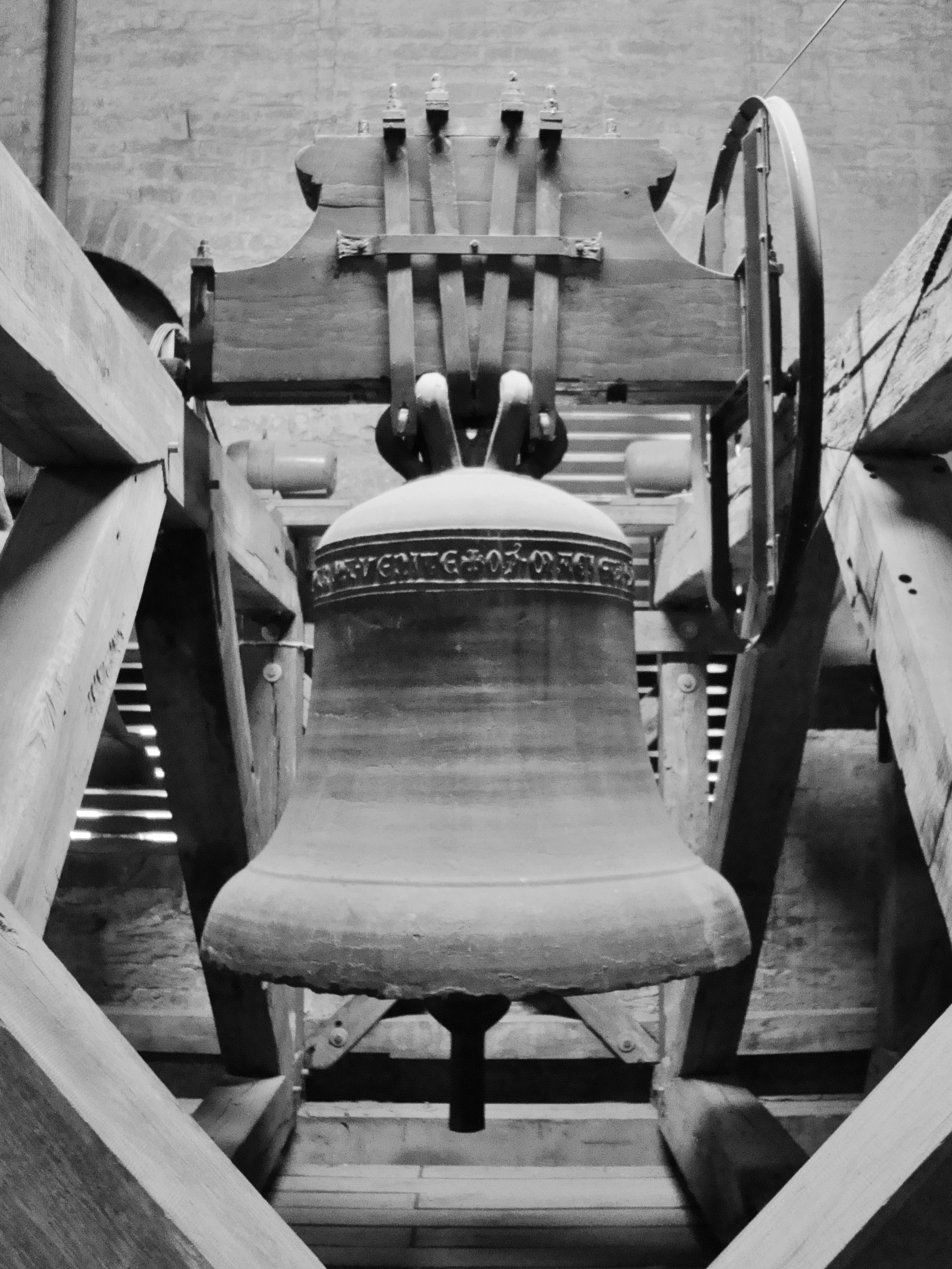
Stormbell, 13th century

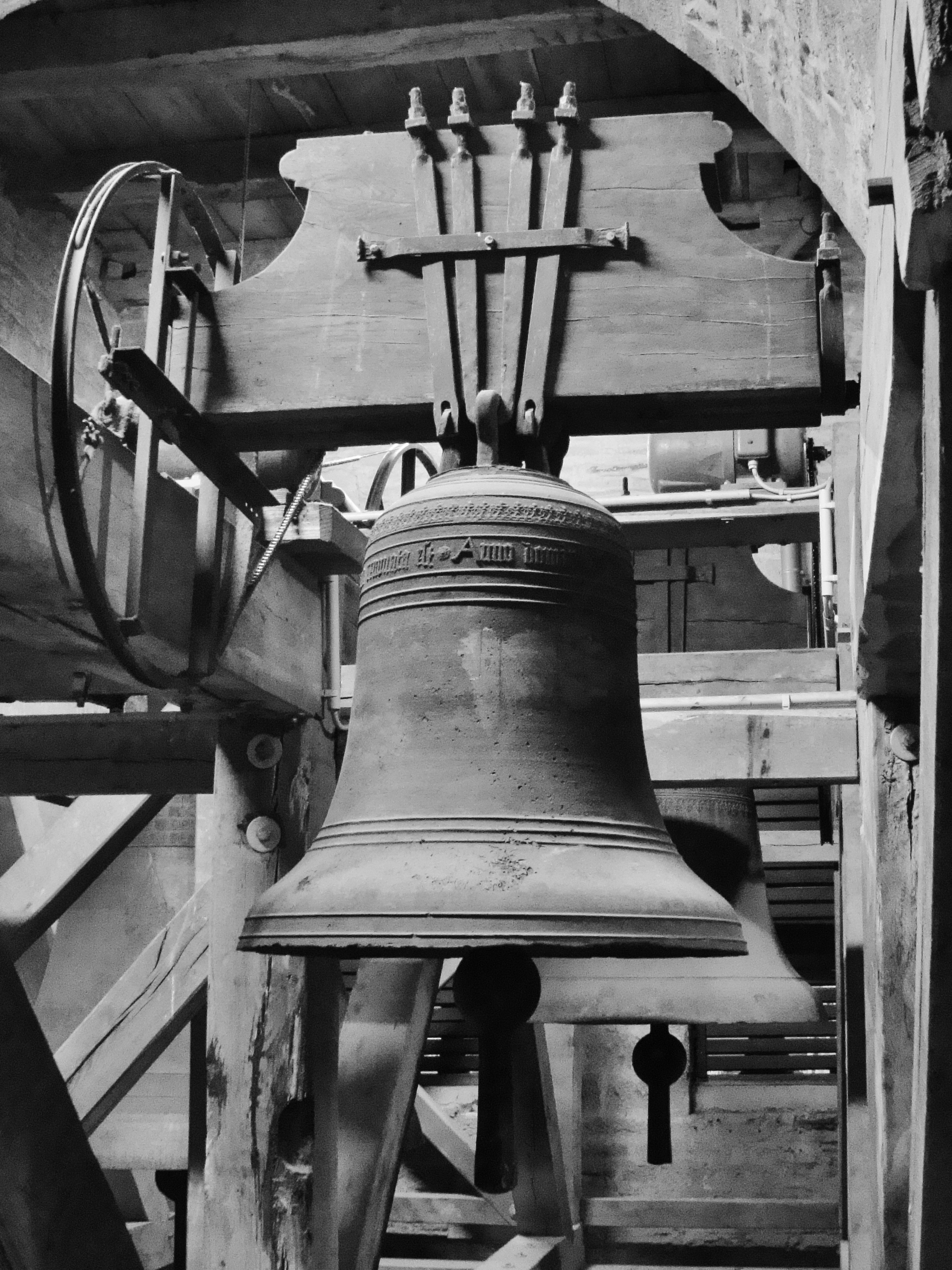
The bell of 1577 maintains the slim form of its predecessor.

The peal of St. Patrokli is made up of eleven bells, which all hang in the around 80-metre-high (260 ft) tower, except for the smallest bell. The peal is one of the greatest historic bell peals in the State. The oldest bells are the two Angelic Bells from the 12th and 13th centuries. Two further bells from the 13th century, the Stormbell and the Stephen's bell (so called only since 1991), are the work of the master bellsmith Hermann of Lemgo. In 1469, John of Dortmund produced the sonorous Our Lady´s bell which was the lowest note in the peal for centuries. In 1577 it was followed by an even smaller bell cast by Rochus Nelman. Its form, which is unusually skinny and narrow for the date it was cast, imitates an earlier bell of 12th- or 13th-century date. The precise co-ordination of these bells with one another is remarkable and seems to be a lucky accident, since the casters of this period took no particular account of possible dissonance with other bells as medieval practice was primarily to ring each bell individually. The fixed functions of the individual bells is demonstrated by their characteristic peal or by their particular inscriptions, which can name the occasions when the bell is to be rung. According to the traditional bell register of the 15th century, a full peal of all the bells occurred only on very rare occasions.

Two further bells from 1633 (Patroklus bell) and 1720 (Townsman Schuster's bell), as well as a small medieval bell, were destroyed in the First World War.

In the process of secularisation, the ensemble was broken up and distributed amongst various local churches: Nelman's bell went to the Church of the Holy Cross, Stephen's bell to St. Albert the Great's. The bells remaining in the church were supplemented after the Second World War by three large cast-steel bells by Bochumer Verein with the strike tones of g^{0}, b^{0} und c^{1}.

The desire arose later to regain the old bells which had been sold off and to complement them with new, more impressive bronze bells; this was motivated by modern musical ideas as well as a desire for historical preservation. As a result, two new bells took on the names of Patroklus bell and Townsman Schuster's bell. Patroklus bell is considered one of the most successful modern bells in Westphalia. The clean peal of the existing bells with one another allowed supplementary tones to be assigned to the new bells. The A single cast-steel bell, the Charles Borromeo bell was retained and integrated into the peal, since it is an appealing musical instrument in spite of its metal composition. In the process of reconstruction, all the bells received new clappers and massive yokes. Finally, for the last few years the smallest bell of all, in the Flèche above the crossing, the Transformation bell, which takes up the place of the Choir bell, which was destroyed in 1918. The peal of Soest's church is counted among the most historically and musically significant bell ensembles in Germany and beyond.

No.	Name	Casting year	Caster	diameter (mm)	weight (kg)	strike tone (ST-^{1}/_{16})
1	Patroclus' bell	1991	Hans August Mark	2.050	5.840	as^{0} −6(+)
2	Charles Borromeo bell (death knell)	1953	Bochumer Verein	1.901	2.442	b^{0} −7
3	All Saints' bell	1991	Hans August Mark	1.550	2.460	des^{1} −4
4	Mary's bell	1469	Johannes von Dortmund	1.398	1.820	es^{1} −6
5	Stormbell	1200	Hermann von Lemgo	1.385	2.100	f^{1} −4−
6	Townsman Schuster's bell (Angelus bell)	1991	Hans August Mark	1.209	1.280	ges^{1} −5
7	Stephen's bell	1220	(as Stormbell)	1.000	765	b^{1} −5
8	God's bell	1577	Rochus Nelman	757	310	es^{2} −7
9	Great English bell	13th century	unknown	587	170	as^{2} +3
10	Little English bell	12th century	unknown	490	106	b^{2} −1
11	Transformation bell	1991	Hans August Mark	456	75	c^{3} ±0

== History of the order ==
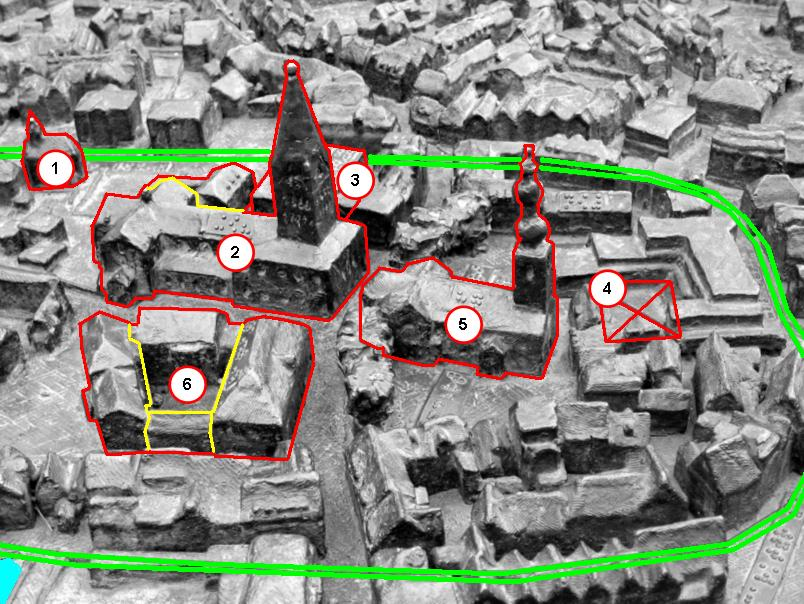
The Ottonian core of the old city (surrounded by green): 1) St. Nicholas' Chapel, 2) St. Patrokli, 3) Wilhelm Morgner House, 4) location of the Old Palace, 5) St. Peter's, 6) Council house with four sections from different centuries; at lower left, a corner of the Great Pond

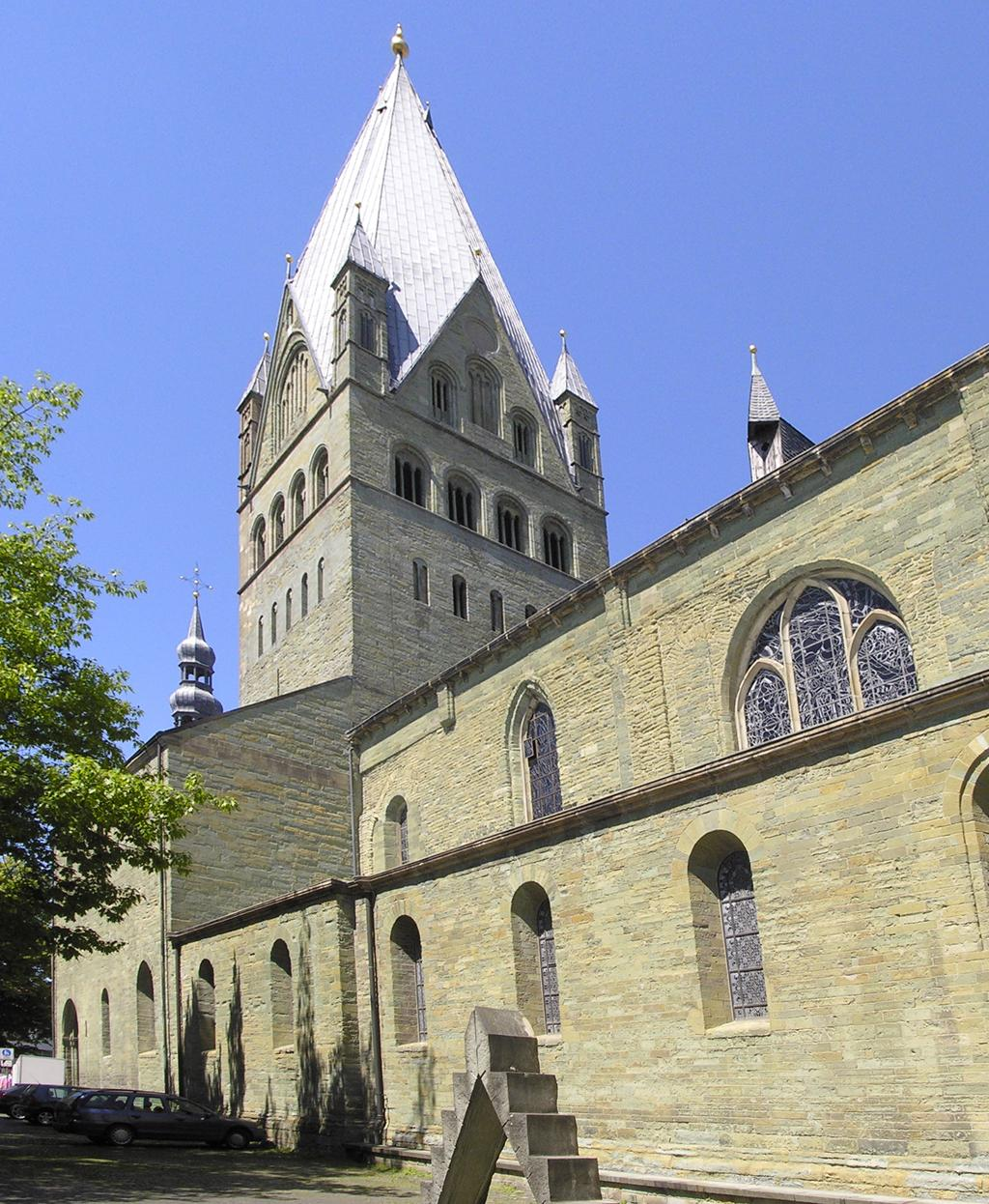
The church from the side, 2005

Due to (church) power politics, Soest was not the seat of a bishopric, but it was the central church of the Archbishopric of Cologne in Westphalia, as well as the Archbishops' secondary residence and second capital. In the area which would later be the Duchy of Westphalia orders of cannonesses were frequently founded by the local nobility. Examples include Meschede Abbey, Geseke Abbey, and Oedingen Abbey. In Soest, the impetus for a foundation came at the beginning of the reign of Bruno the Great as Archbishop of Cologne (brother of Otto I and son of Henry the Fowler.

The remains of Saint Patroclus of Troyes had been given to Archbishop Brun, when he was visiting the French court on a diplomatic matter. He took these relics from Troyes back to Cologne, where they remained for four years before they were brought to Soest in 954. As the first relics of the city, they were greeted with great celebration by the citizenry and the clerics. A detailed account is found in De translatione sancti Patrocli martyris.

The bishop intended to establish a religious order in Soest and at Cologne. In his testament, therefore, Bruno left 100 pounds of silver, liturgical equipment and paraments for the project. His plans were carried out by Archbishop Folcmar (965–969).

The first canons probably came from St. Andrew's in Cologne. It statutes were probably also used as the model for the new order in Soest. The seat of the order was expanded through the donations of the Archbishop of Cologne and to a lesser degree by other orders in the region. However, it remained a rather small chapter until it was expanded in the time of Archbishop Anno II (r. 1056–1075), who donated four further prebends. As a result, the number of canons doubled. Archbishop Rainald of Dassel (r. 1159–1167) consecrated the order's church on 8 July 1166.

The chapter had the right of a free provost, but from 1221, the provosts had to come from the chapter of Cologne cathedral. From 1257, the office of provost was combined with that of Collator of the parishes of the city and its environs. In addition to this he was the dean for Soest's hinterland. The provosts attempted in later times to displace the Provost of Cologne cathedral from their position as archdeacons. This finally came to pass in the 15th century. The order formed its own district with Church immunity and also possessed a school for the pre-education of clergy.

For centuries, the order of Patroclus was the most powerful and richest order in the whole Duchy of Westphalia; at times up to 54 parishes were dependent on the order. The provosts, who at least in earlier centuries derived largely from the high nobility, were also canons of the cathedral chapter in Cologne for a large portion of the Middle Ages and one of the four Grand-Archdeacons. From time to time they were also officials of the Archbishop of Cologne. Only once or twice a year did the provost visit St. Patrokli in Soest (in order to hold the church court). The rest of the time he was represented by deans, who were responsible for the management of the order. In the Soest Feud (1444–1449), conflict broke out about who was in charge of the city of Soest. This affected the order extending from it to the Archbishop of Cologne himself. The Reformation was resisted by the order. After the canons refused to convert to the new teachings, they left the city. A portion of St. Patrokli became an evangelical church. In 1548, Dean Johann Gropper restored Catholicism and the canons of the order returned. They remained from that time until their abolition in 1812.

== Image gallery ==
=== Building ===
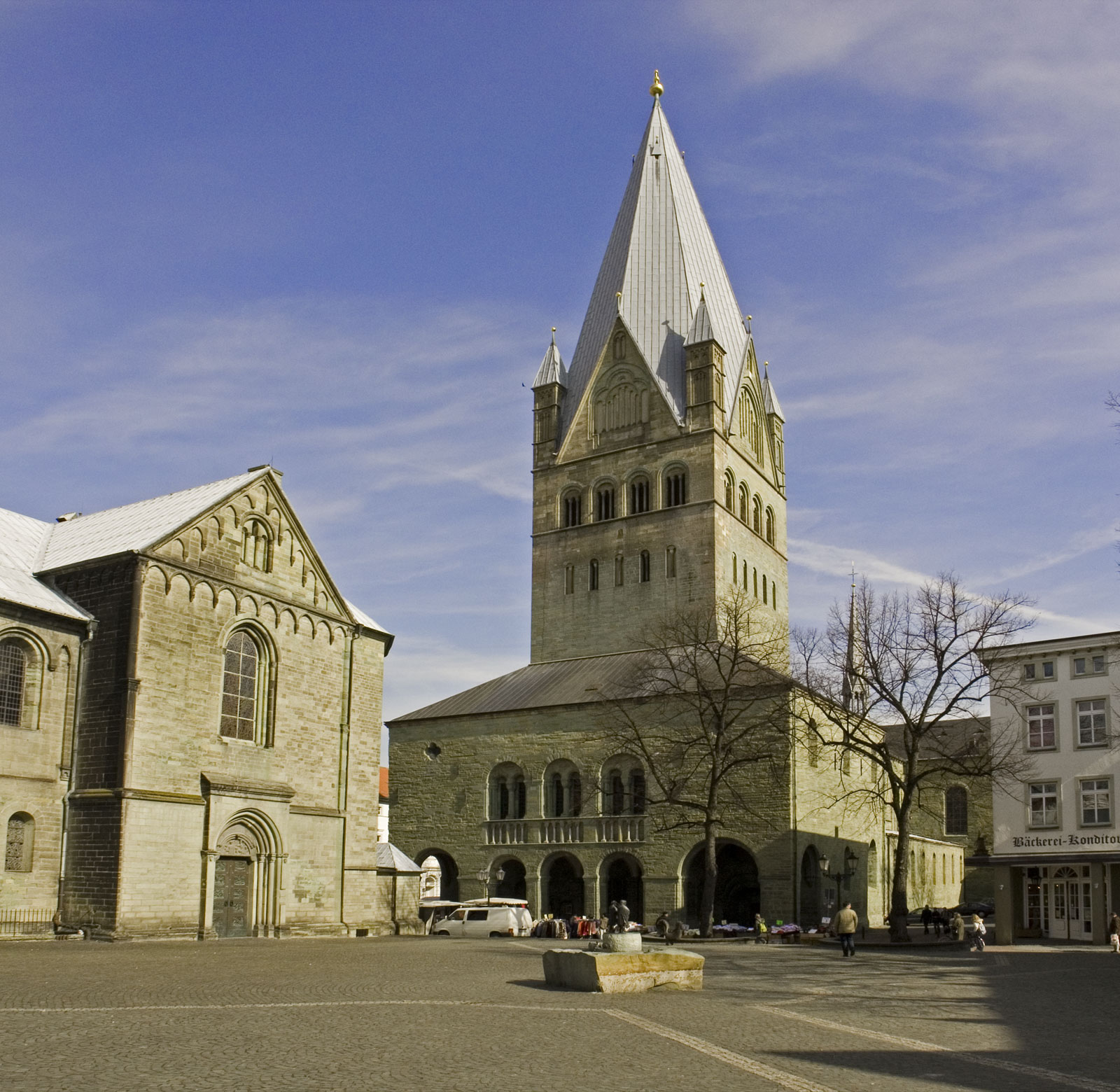
St. Patrokli's
westwerk with tower, part of St. Peter's at left

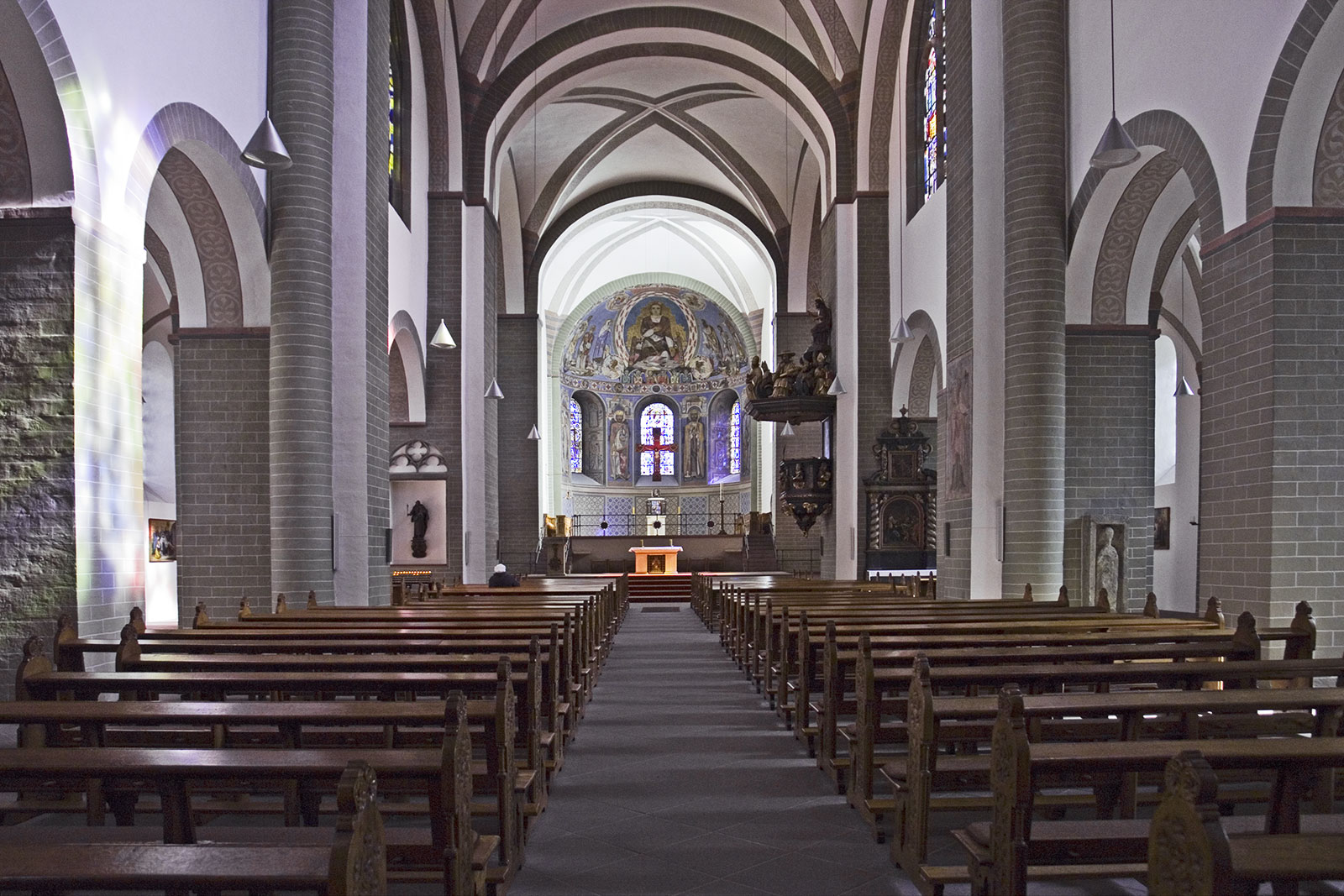
St. Patrokli's
nave

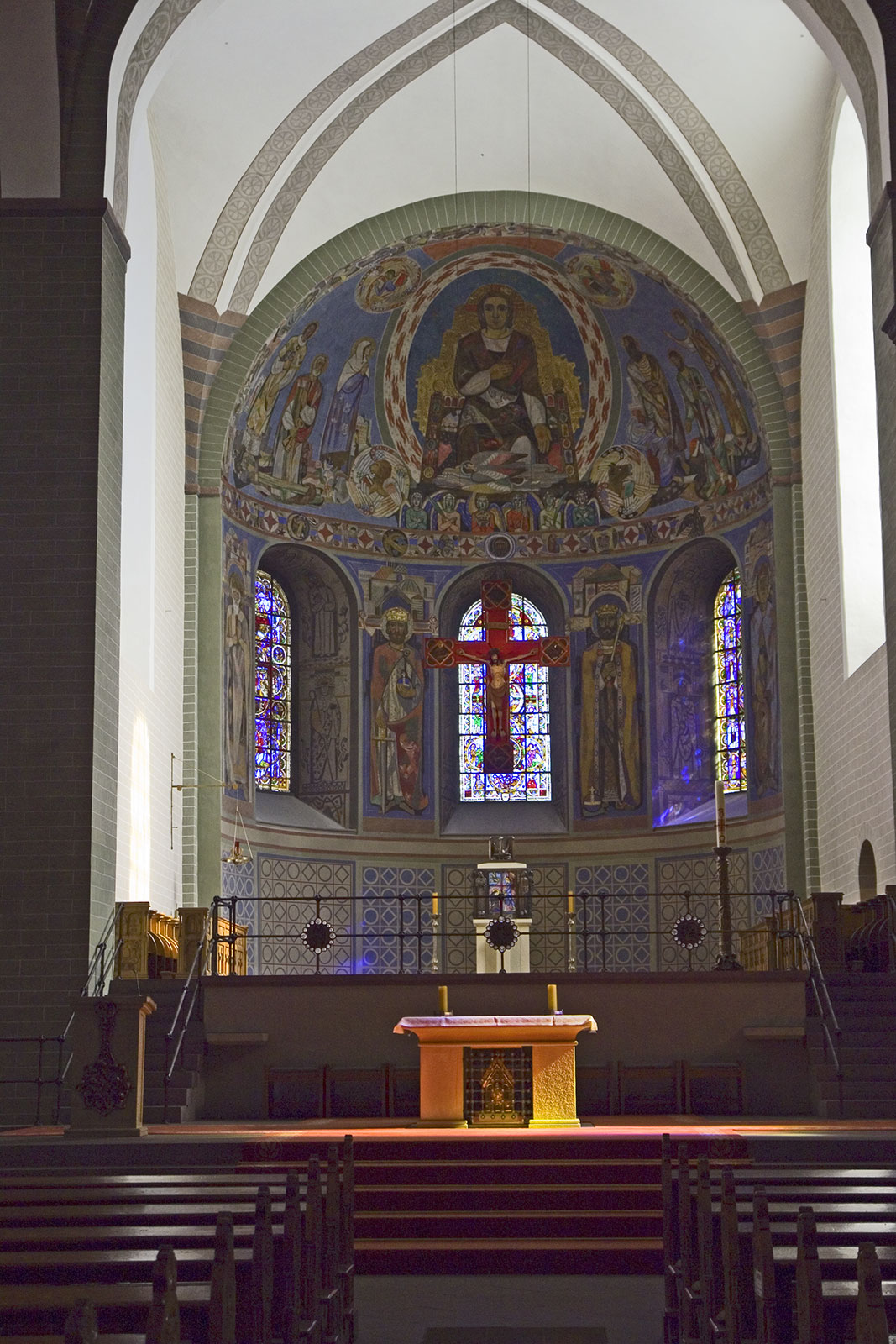
St. Patrokli's
Altar room (Apse)

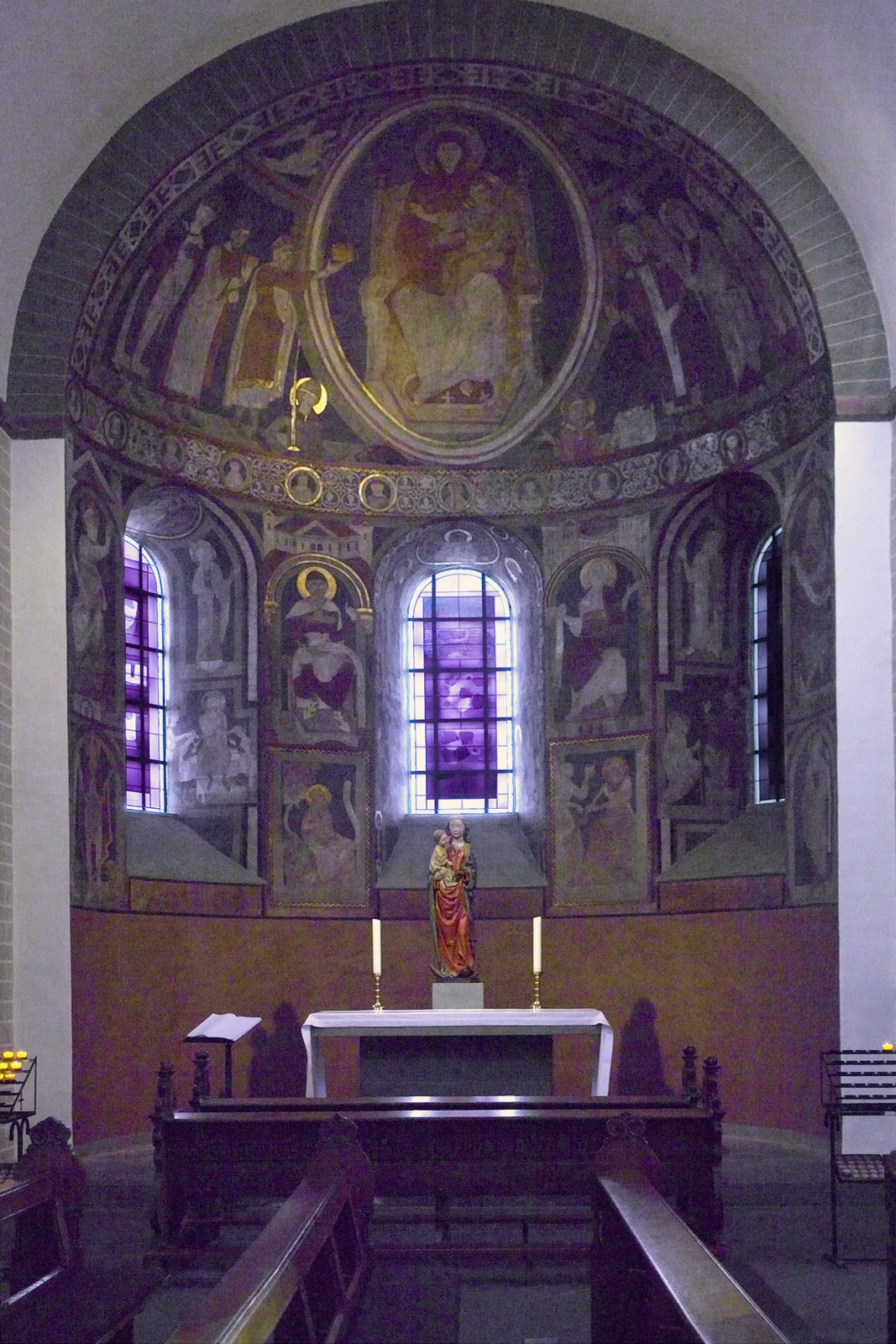
St. Patrokli's'
side chapel

=== "Westphalian Nativity" ===
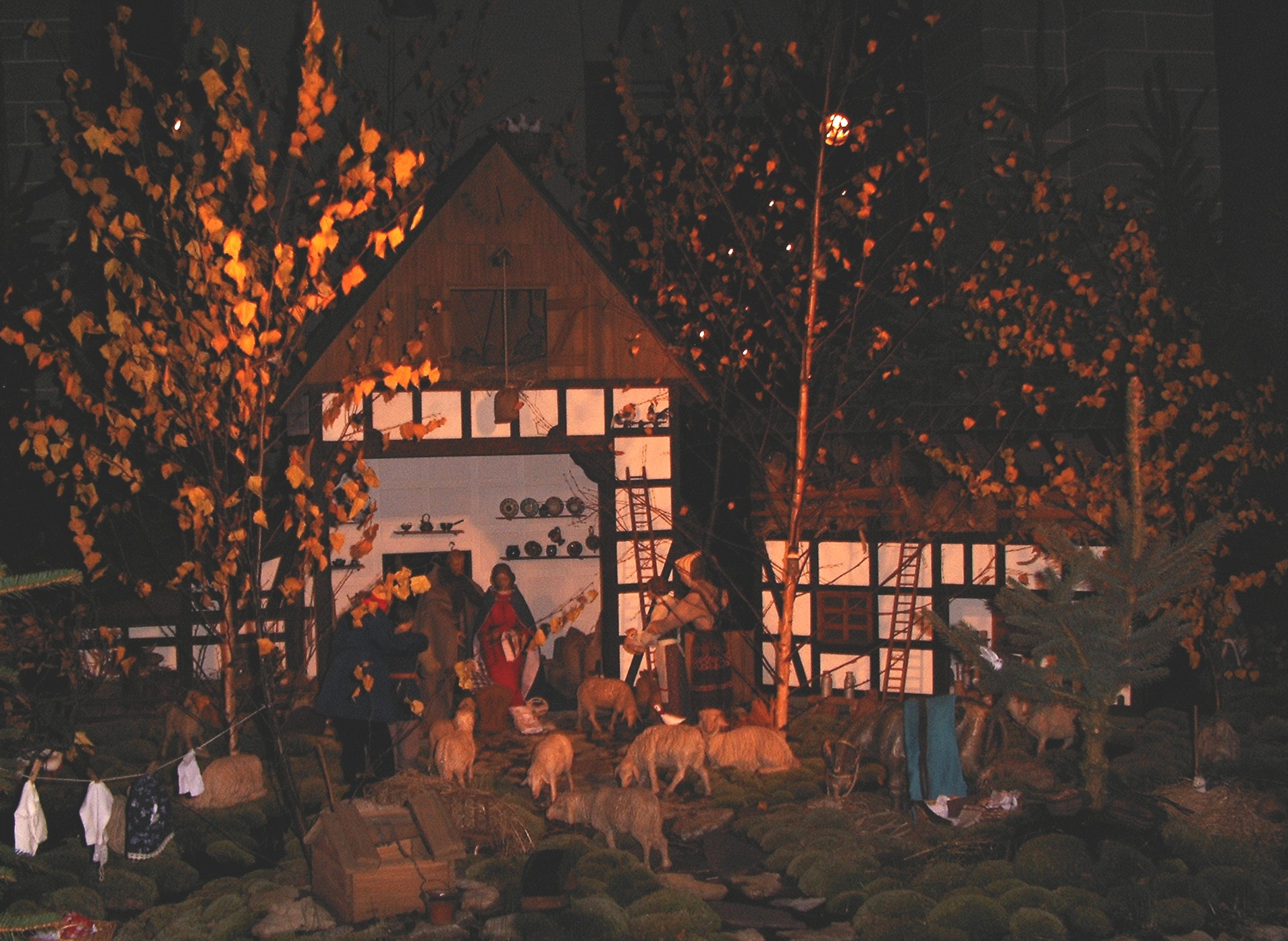

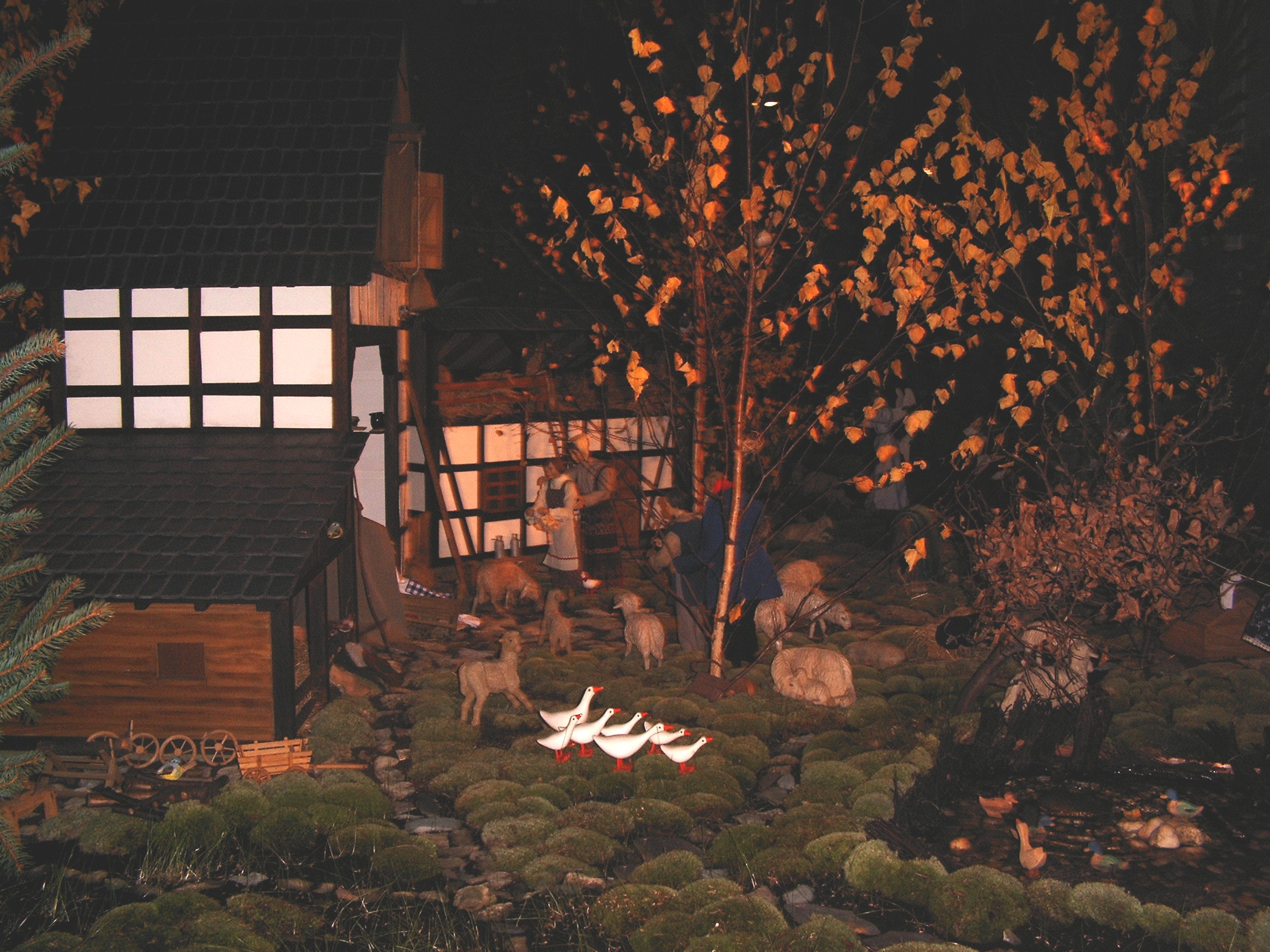

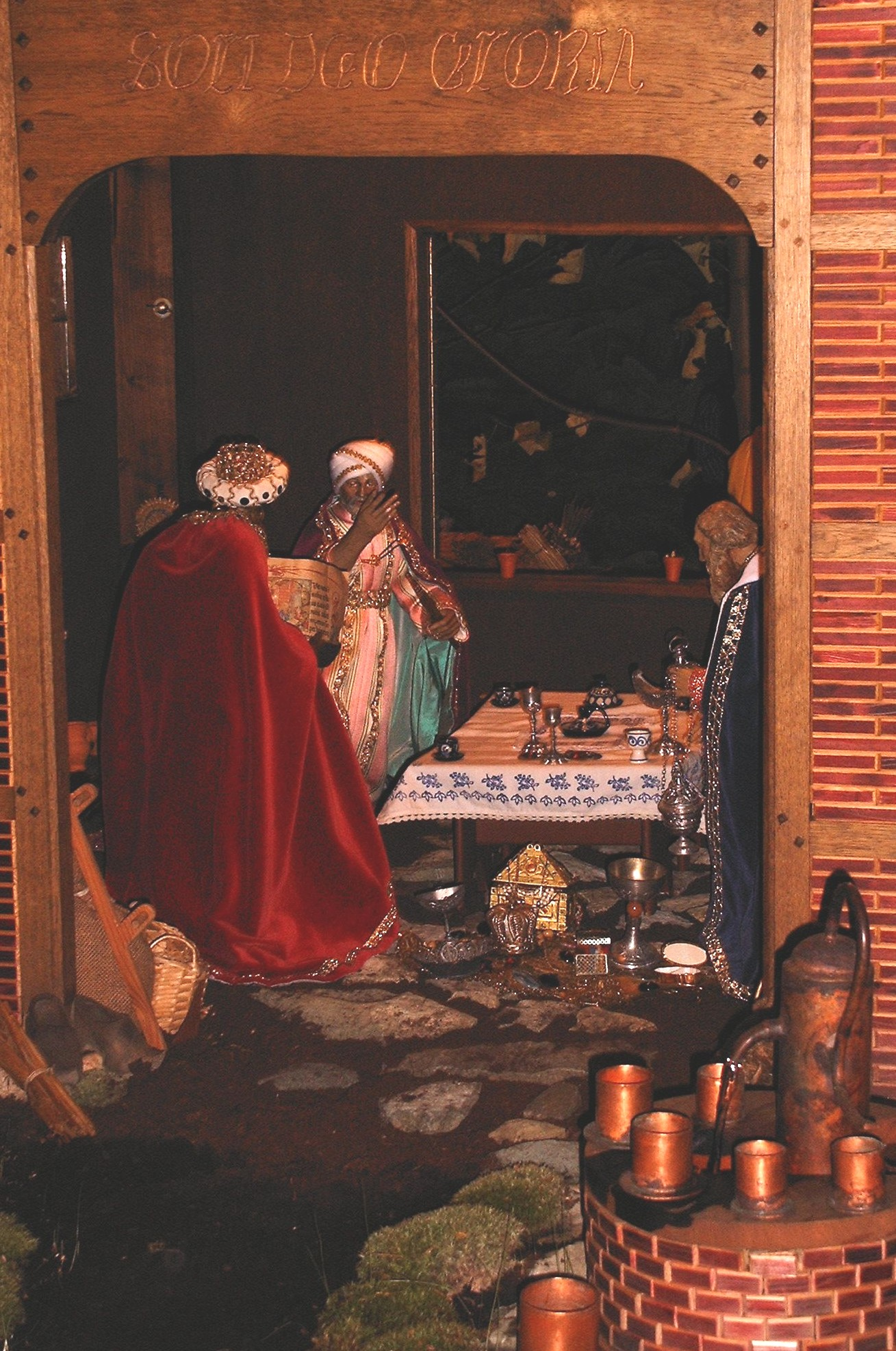

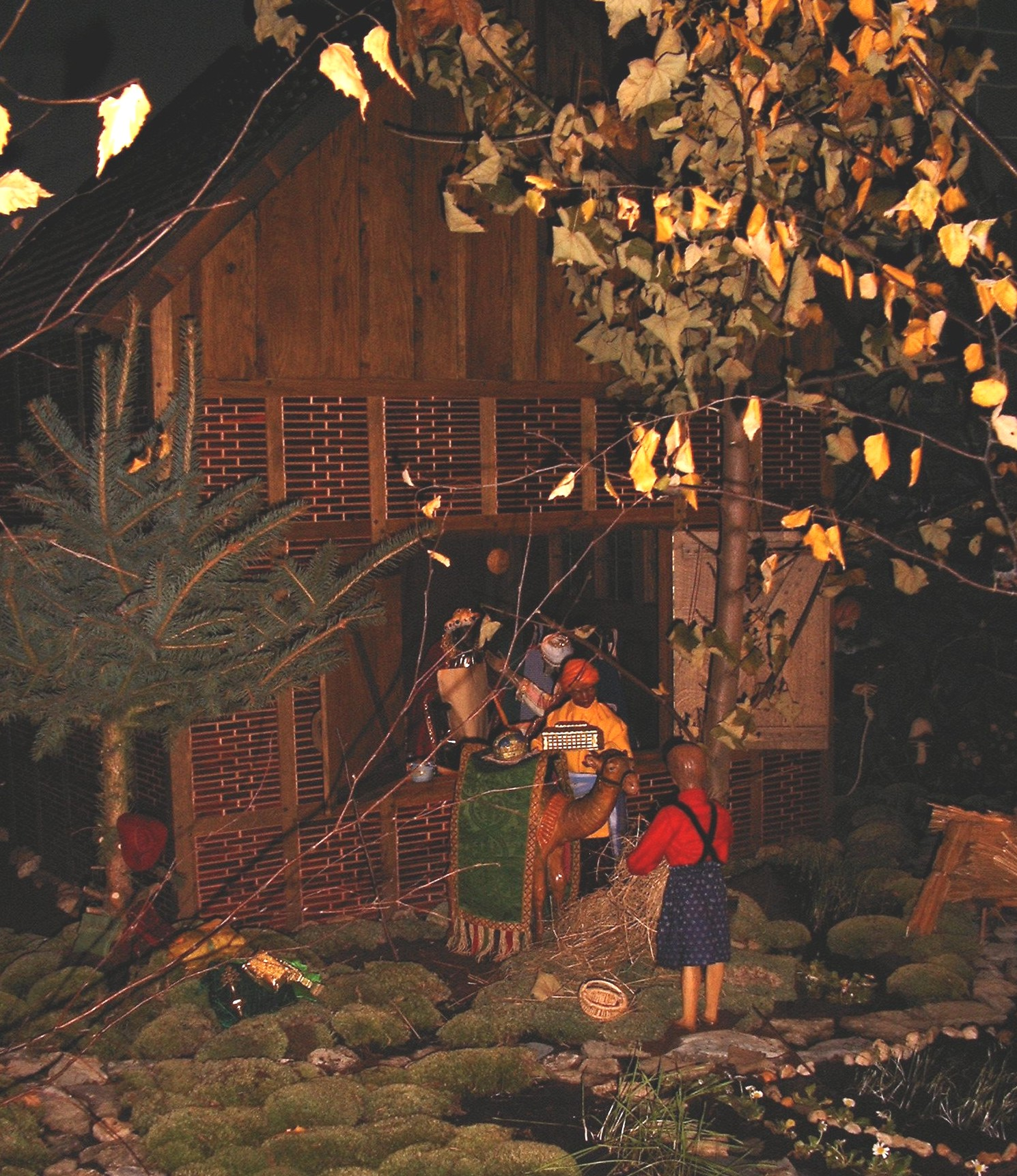

== Bibliography ==
- Louis Grodecki. "St. Patrokli in Soest". In Romanische Glasmalerei. Kohlhammer Verlag, Stuttgart 1977, ISBN 3-17-004433-8, pp. 161–166.
- Eberhard Linnhoff. St. Patrokli, Nikolai-Kapelle und Dom-Museum in Soest. Langewiesche, Königstein im Taunus 1984, ISBN 3-7845-5100-9.
