= National Cathedral of Romania =

Romanian Orthodox cathedral in Bucharest, Romania

- Catedrala Națională a României
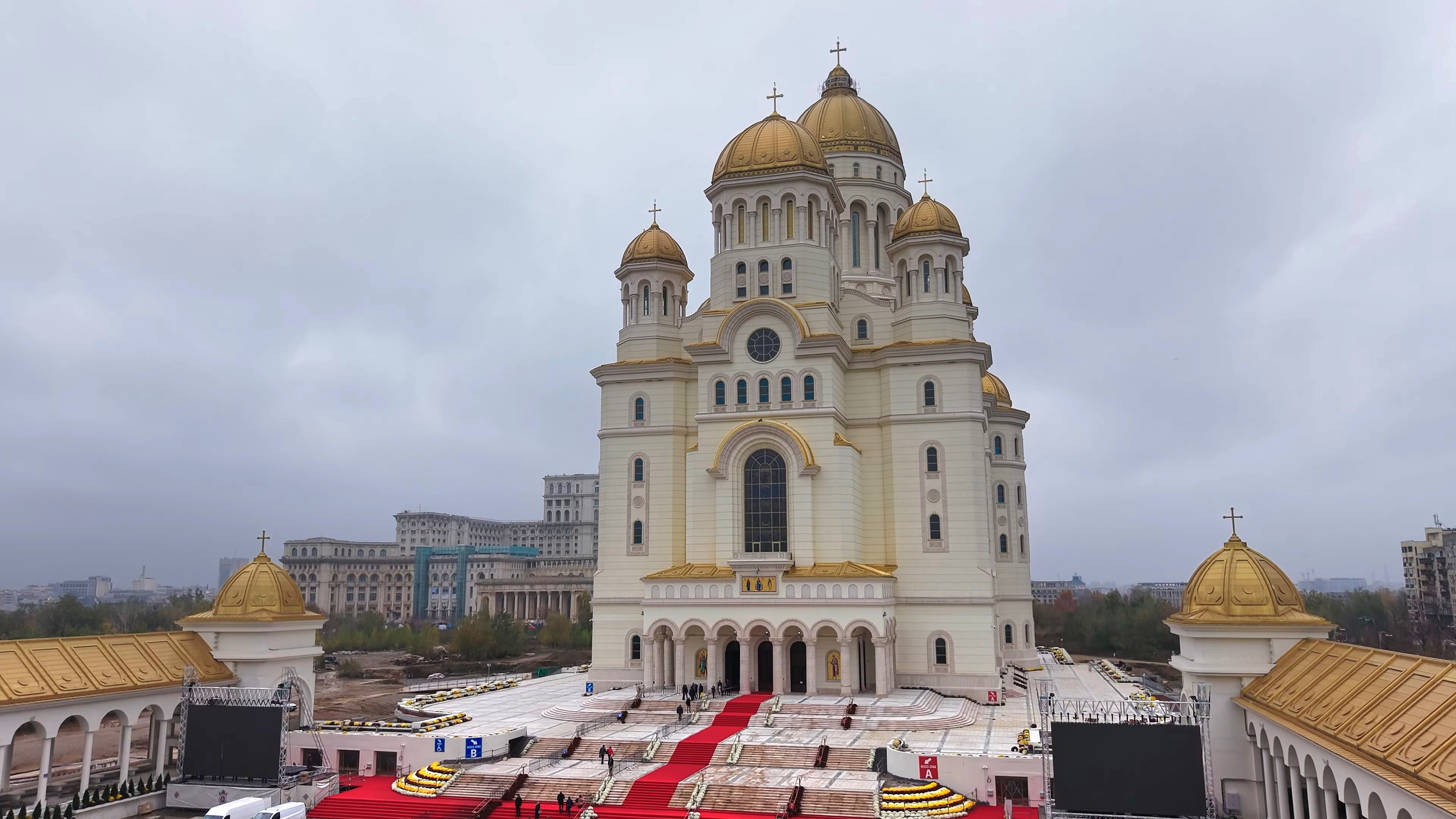
- The cathedral in November 2025
- National Cathedral of Romania
- Location: 13 September Ave (4–60), Sector 5, Bucharest
- Country: Romania
- Denomination: Eastern Orthodox
- Website: catedrala-nationala.ro

History
- Status: Completed
- Consecrated: 25 November 2018

Architecture
- Style: Neo-Byzantine
- Groundbreaking: 15 December 2010
- Completed: 26 October 2025
- Construction cost: €315 million (October 2025)

Specifications
- Capacity: 7,000 (Note: The cathedral is projected to accommodate about 20 thousand people in the main building and its underground galleries. A total of 7,000 pilgrims can attend the Holy Liturgy simultaneously, which includes 1,000 reserved seats for the choir and clergy. The underground chapel can accommodate 5,000 pilgrims, and the underground St. Andrew's Cave gallery can accommodate 7,000 pilgrims.); 323,000 m^{3}
- Length: 126.1 m (interior); 140.7 m (stairs)
- Width: 67.7 m
- Height: 127 m (interior-cross); 133 m (ground-cross) (Note: According to Vanel Exim, the architectural firm behind the cathedral's design, the interior height from the floor to the apex of the dome is 120 meters. With the addition of the 7-meter cross, the total internal height reaches 127 meters. Regarding the exterior, the structure rises 129 meters from the pedestal to the top of the cross. The main floor is positioned 6 meters above the ground, while the altar section stands at 7 meters, exactly echoing the height of the 7-meter cross. Consequently, the total elevation from the ground to the tip of the cross is 133 meters.)

The National Cathedral (Romanian: Catedrala Națională), also known as the People's Salvation Cathedral (Romanian: Catedrala Mântuirii Neamului), is an Eastern Orthodox cathedral in Bucharest, Romania, built to serve as the patriarchal cathedral of the Romanian Orthodox Church. It is located in central Bucharest on Spirea's Hill (Arsenal Square), facing the Palace of Parliament. At 127 meters (133 meters from ground) tall, the cathedral occupies a dominant position in Bucharest's cityscape, being visible from all approaches to the city.

It is the tallest and largest Eastern Orthodox church building by volume, and area, (Note: Saint Isaac's Cathedral in Saint Petersburg although larger in gross area (7,000 m^{2} the building including colonnades and 7,600 m^{2} with stairway), has a smaller area excluding colonnades (5,000 m^{2}). Since 1931 it has been converted into a Russian state museum.) in the world. The People's Salvation Cathedral has the largest collection of church mosaics (interior decoration) in the world, covering about 25,000 square meters. Also the People's Salvation Cathedral has the world's largest Orthodox iconostasis (23.8 meters long and 17.1 meters high) and the world's largest free-swinging church bell.

The cathedral is dedicated to the Ascension of Christ, which in Romania is celebrated as Heroes' Day, and to Saint Andrew the Apostle, the protector of Romania. The cathedral was consecrated on 25 November 2018, by the Ecumenical Patriarch of Constantinople, Bartholomew I, Patriarch Daniel of Romania and Metropolitan Chrysostomos (gr) of Patras from the Greek Orthodox Church. Subsequently, Patriarch Bartholomew I and Patriarch Daniel, returned to jointly consecrate the cathedral's mosaic on 26 October 2025 which also marked permanent opening of the place of worship after 15 years of construction.

== History ==
=== Background ===
The idea of a national cathedral first emerged following the Romanian War of Independence (1877–1878), which was primarily fought between the Russian and Ottoman Empires. The church was intended to symbolize the victory of Orthodox Christians over Ottoman Muslims. The idea was shelved due to a lack of consensus on the design, location and funding. The Unification of the Romanian Principalities in 1859 led to a unitary organization of church structures in Moldavia and Wallachia within the Holy Synod (1872). The old Metropolitan Cathedral had proven to be overcrowded, especially during national holidays, such as the Proclamation of the Kingdom of Romania and the coronation of King Carol I of Romania (10 May 1881). Therefore, at King Carol I's desire, Romania's Assembly of Deputies and the Senate voted in favor of Law no. 1750 on the construction of the Cathedral Church in Bucharest, which was promulgated by King Carol I on 5 June 1884.

On 10 May 1920, King Ferdinand I sent a royal letter to Archbishop Miron Cristea, the first Metropolitan-Primate of Greater Romania, supporting the project, but this had no effect. In 1925, after the Romanian Orthodox Church became an independent patriarchate, Metropolitan Cristea now newly enthroned as the first Patriarch of All Romania, suggested Carol Park as a site, but Bibescu Vodă Square (Unirii Square) was chosen instead. There, in 1929, a cross (calvary) was raised, but lack of funds meant the construction was postponed and later abandoned. Patriarch Teoctist was the one who re-launched the project of building a National Cathedral. To this end, he sanctified a cross on 5 February 1999, as the cornerstone of the future cathedral in Unirii Square, which had previously been sanctified by Patriarch Miron Cristea. Meanwhile, there had been an epochal event, which was the visit by Pope John Paul II to Romania (7–9 May 1999).

On 16 February 2005, the Bucharest City Hall proposed Arsenal Hill to the Patriarchate as "the most suitable place to be available" for the structure, considering it the highest place in Bucharest. Following the Patriarchate's approval, the Government of Romania promoted Ordinance no. 19/17 March 2005, for the building of the People's Salvation Cathedral. Subsequently, the Chamber of Deputies voted to give the 110,000 square meter building site to the Romanian Patriarchate via a protocol on 13 February 2006. Arsenal Hill was recommended after three other locations had been proposed at different stages: Piața Unirii (1999), Alba Iulia Square (2001), and Carol Park (2004). The communist regime had previously demolished three churches (Alba Postăvari, Spirea Veche, and Izvorul Tămăduirii) and moved two others (Schitul Maicilor and Mihai Vodă) to build the civic center and the Palace of the Parliament (previously known as the House of the People). The cornerstone for the construction of the People's Salvation Cathedral was sanctified on 29 November 2007, officiated by Patriarch Daniel, the sixth Patriarch of the Romanian Orthodox Church.

=== Name ===
Metropolitan-primate Miron Cristea first proposed the name of the cathedral on 10 May 1920. Speaking before the Holy Synod and King Ferdinand, he advocated for building a People's Cathedral to celebrate the birth of Greater Romania. Metropolitan Miron explained that the cathedral "will prove to be a visible symbol of our unity in faith and law". King Ferdinand then took the floor, referring to the project as a Church of Redemption, while Metropolitan Pimen Georgescu used a slightly different phrasing mentioning the People's Redemption Church.

The Romanian word "neam" is difficult to translate into English, because the term people does not properly convey the sense of unity of blood and lineage that "neam" suggests. It is perhaps better expressed by phrases like ethnic nation or kin. National identity, in this sense, is a kind of ancestor worship, a system of kinship in which national heroes, occupy the place of clan elders in defining a nation as a noble lineage. The word "mântuire" just like "neam", is specifically Romanian and is also a complex term. Although it is commonly translated as salvation, it retains a spiritual nuance that makes redemption a better alternative. Patriarch Daniel explained the choice of the name at the 2008 symposium "New Patriarchal Cathedral", stating: "this name is a manifestation of gratitude or thanksgiving, brought to God for the deliverance of the Romanian nation from oppression and alienation".

=== Feast days ===
The first celebration of the day is the Ascension of Christ, which is also the day dedicated to Romanian heroes of all times and places. The second is the celebration of Saint Apostle Andrew the First-Called, the Protector of Romania. Two relics of Saint Andrew the Apostle from Italy, the right leg fibula and another fragment from the Amalfi Cathedral, were donated to the cathedral. This donation was made on the occasion of the Romanian Patriarchate's centennial and for the consecration of the cathedral's nave in 2025.

Patriarch Daniel said about the first celebration: "The homage paid to the memory of the Romanian heroes of World War I, who fought for national freedom, unity, and dignity, must be a source of inspiration and renewal for patriotic Romanians today. That is why the main dedication of the People's Salvation Cathedral is the Lord's Ascension, when we celebrate the Day of Heroes". Patriarch Daniel said about the second celebration: "This building will be a symbol of national unity because the feast of Saint Apostle Andrew, which was placed the day before the National Day on 1 December, shows that our national unity settled among Romanians primarily on spiritual unity, on unity of faith, thought, and sentiment. Our church greatly contributed to the development of the Romanian language and culture".

=== Construction ===
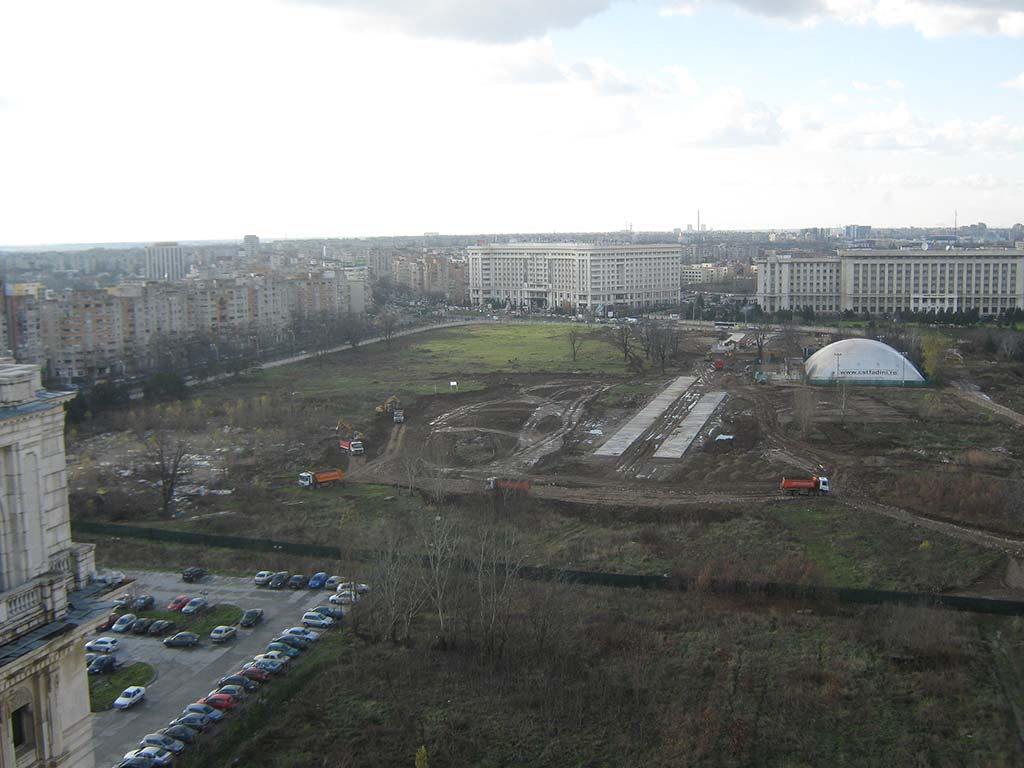
People's Salvation Cathedral (commencement), 2010

The Romanian Patriarchate launched a tender on 28 December 2009, to select the architectural design for the People's Salvation Cathedral, and Vanel Exim based in Bacău, was chosen for the architectural design of the cathredral. To begin the cathedral's construction, 24 notices were required from various state institutions and the Bucharest City Hall. The works officially started on 15 December 2010.

Between December 2010 and June 2011, the company Foretis Inject executed the 80-centimeter-thick diaphragm walls of the foundation to a depth of 15.6 meters (north-south walls). Simultaneously, the company Lufin Construct excavated 90 thousand cubic meters of soil from the foundation pit. On the higher north–south walls, the anchorages were mounted on three levels. On the shorter east–west walls, two-level anchorages were mounted, and the last level of anchorages is located below the groundwater level. The hanger rods have a 75-degree inclination toward the foundation wall, and the fastening was made with the help of 750 anchorages drilled into concrete by the Italian company CasaGrande.

On 28 June 2011, the contract for the building's foundation construction was signed with the Bog'Art company. Between July 2011 and April 2013, the cathedral was built up to the nave floor, reaching a height of 7 meters (including altar) from the ground. The deep foundation is a 120-meter-long monoblock structure, composed of a network of concrete beams, and was engineered to withstand foundation sliding during earthquakes. The foundation itself was constructed between December 2011 and June 2012, with the basement completed by April 2013. The cathedral's main building is designed as a structure independent from the surrounding walls of the foundation, allowing it to move like a piston in a cylinder. An 8-centimeter insulation layer of expanded polystyrene is situated around the foundation, between the lead tank and the diaphragm walls. This layer facilitates the cathedral's movement in all directions during an earthquake. The cathedral is designed to withstand earthquakes of up to 9 magnitude on the Richter scale.

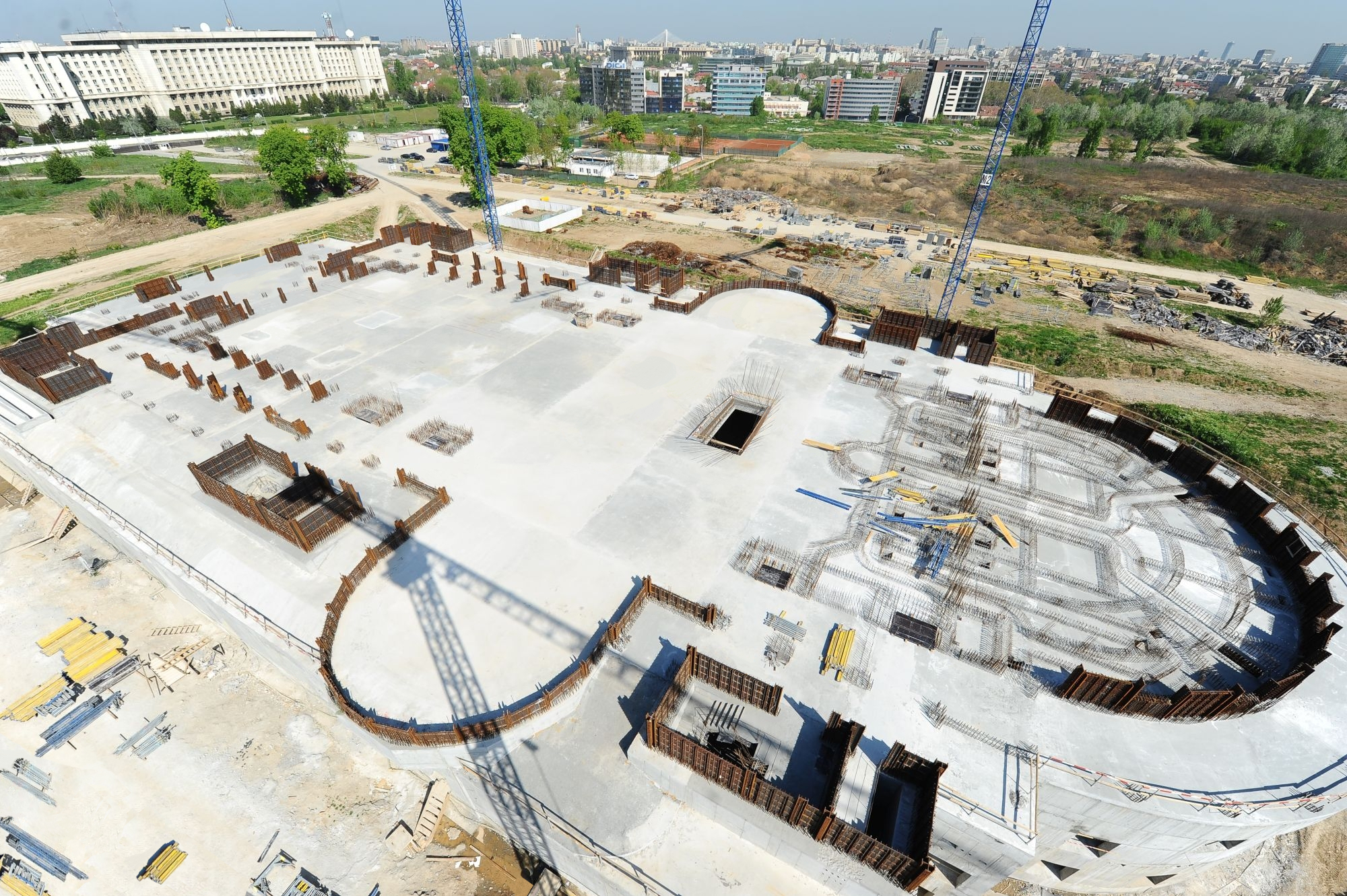
Construction in 2013

For the waterproofing of the cathedral, the Bog'Art engineering team, alongside Swiss engineer Franco Sticher, conducted extensive tests over three months in Romania and Switzerland. The materials tested included bitumen, bentonite, polyurethane, and lead foil. Due to its resistance to corrosion, the entire foundation of the cathedral was encased in a lead tank. In November and December 2011, over 120 welders worked to weld 10 thousand square meters of lead foil. Approximately 400 tons of lead were used in the cathedral's foundation, with the material being 4 mm thick horizontally and 3 mm thick vertically. Lead was chosen for its high plastic deformation capacity without breaking, a necessary quality given the building's massive weight. It is commonly used as a shell material in high-voltage power cables and as a protective sheath for underground or underwater cables to prevent water diffusion into the insulation.

On 22 July 2013, a contract was signed with the Austrian company Strabag for the construction of the building's superstructure. By June 2015, the height of the structure had been raised by more than half. To achieve the vaults, the upper part of the nave and the dome, to avoid putting pressure on the nave's floor, a metal scaffolding structure weighing 1,100 tons was installed. This structure was in the form of a trapezium with its base at 27 meters and was gradually raised up to 45 meters. On 8 April 2025, the seven-meter and seven-ton cross was installed on the dome of the National Cathedral of Romania.

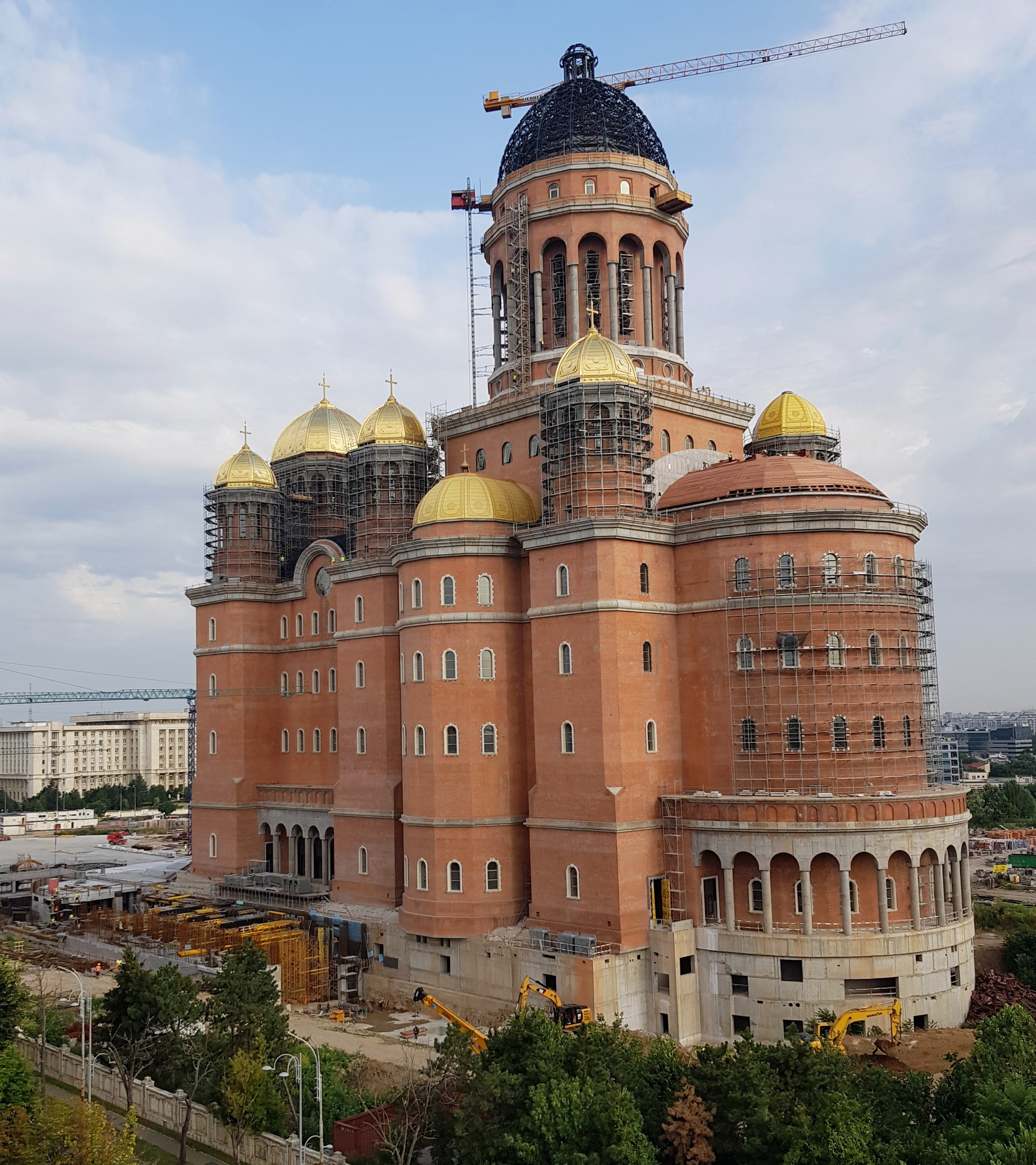
Construction in 2019

To build the People's Salvation Cathedral, over 145 thousand cubic meters of heavy concrete, about 40 thousand tons of reinforcement, about 22 thousand tons of bricks, plus other materials were used, this brings the cathedral's weight to about 425 thousand tons, surpassing Saint Isaac's Cathedral (322 thousand tons) and making it the heaviest Eastern Orthodox Church building in the world. About 13% of the total concrete, sand, and steel quantity used in the Palace of Parliament was utilized for the People's Salvation Cathedral. The concrete used (C40/50) is the same grade employed for the Vidraru Dam, which demonstrated its resistance during the 1977 earthquake without sustaining any cracks. The thickest rebar used in the reinforced cement concrete (RCC) is the BTS500-S, measuring 32 millimeters in diameter.

For the cathedral's construction, 6,200 cubic meters of solid bricks produced in Câmpulung Muscel and 7,800 cubic meters of hollow bricks from Târgu Jiu were used. The clay for the solid bricks was sourced from the Grui hill near Câmpulung Muscel. The bricks used are absorbent, ensuring strong adhesion between the mortar layer and the brick when the first layer of plaster is applied, thanks to the brick's porosity. When the bricks are struck, they emit a metallic sound. The cathedral wall, viewed from outside to inside, has the following structure: hollow bricks, flexible reinforcements (steel bars), rigid metal structure (welded sheet metal reinforcement), flexible reinforcements, and solid bricks.

== Architecture ==
=== Design ===
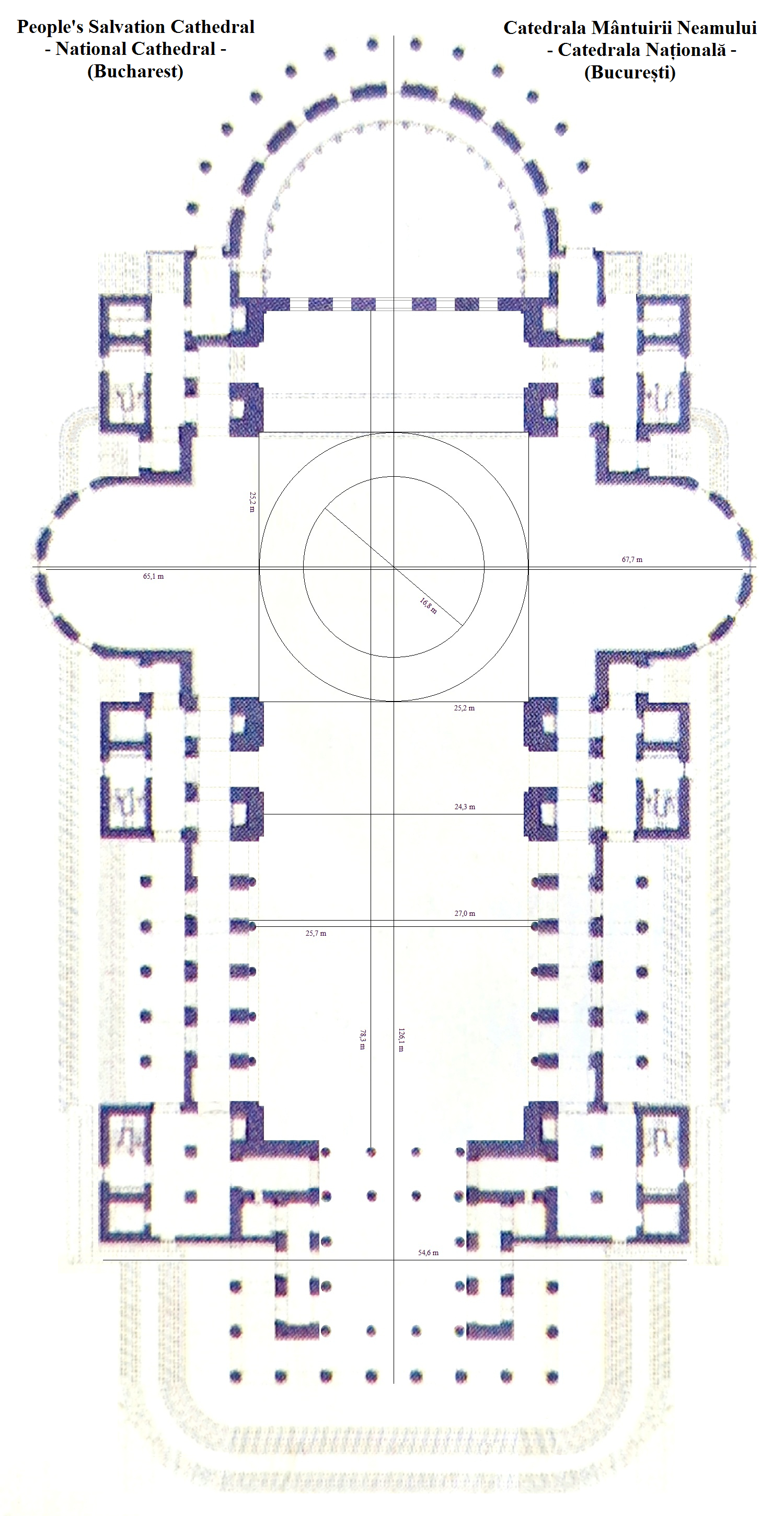
Plan (footprint)

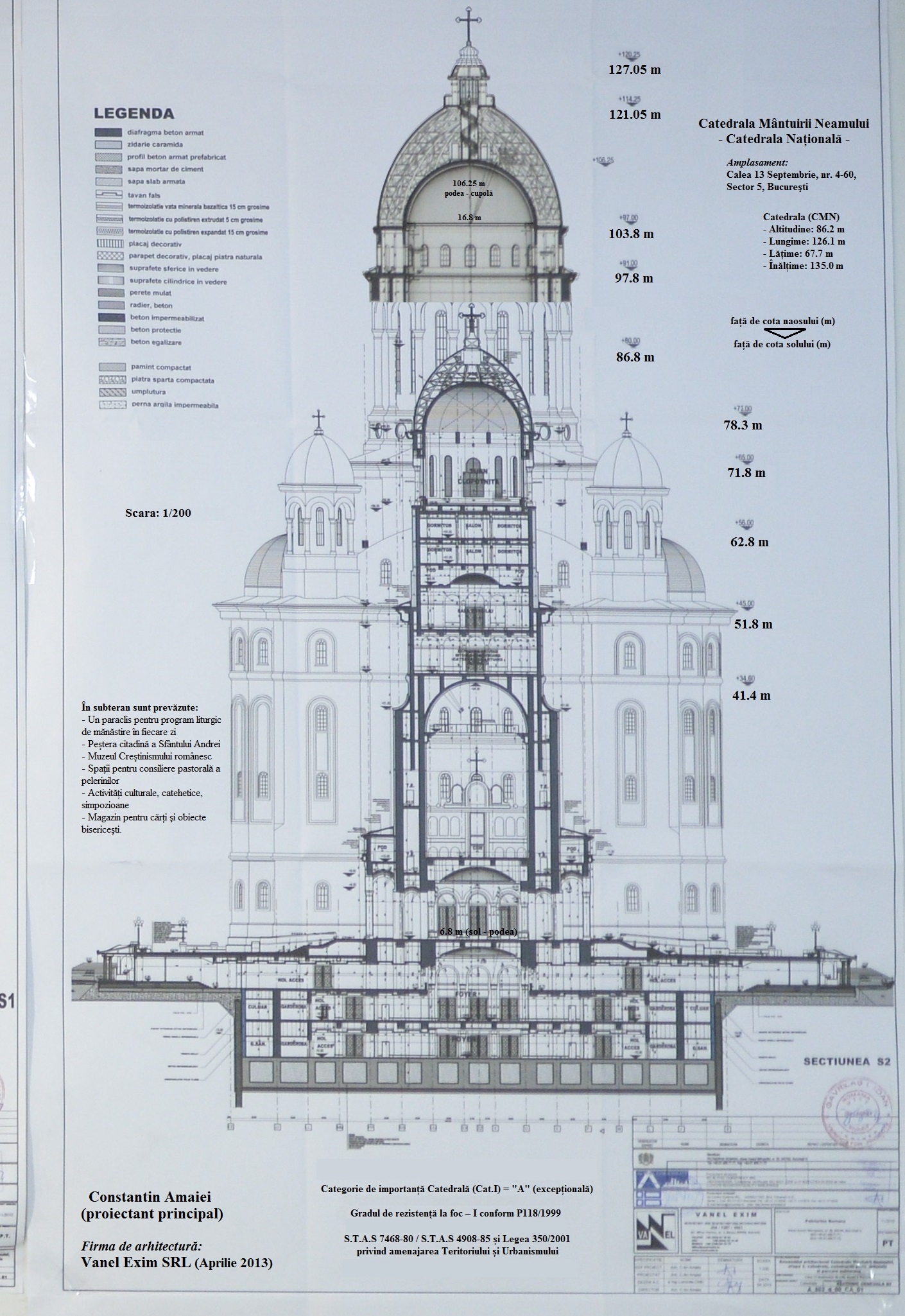
Plan (front)

The cathedral is projected to accommodate about 20,000 people in the main building and its underground galleries. A total of 7,000 pilgrims can attend the Holy Liturgy simultaneously, which includes 1,000 reserved seats for the choir and clergy. The underground chapel can accommodate 5,000 pilgrims, and the underground St. Andrew's Cave gallery can accommodate 7,000 pilgrims. The entire 11-hectares complex can host 125,000 people, while the 11,600 square-meters of piazza can host over 23,000 people. The main cathedral has a floor area of 6,050 square meters (nave floor) and 8,100 square meters including the stairway. The cathedral's dimensions are 126 meters in length, 68 meters in width, and 133 meters in height (from ground level). The main building is elevated 7 meters (including altar), with the basement area extending 15.6 meters below ground level. This basement area, which extends below ground level, measures 7,200 square meters. The cathedral volume above the floor is 323 thousand cubic meters, with the basement contributing 479 thousand cubic meters. The structure, including its pedestal, totals 508 thousand cubic meters, and when including the underground St. Andrew's gallery, the overall volume reaches 595 thousand cubic meters.

In the Romanian architecture landscape, the cathedral draws landmark inspiration from several buildings. The dome's peristyle surrounded by sixteen arches, the six upper octagonal towers with squared bases, are found at the Dormition of the Theotokos Cathedral, Cluj-Napoca. The bell tower's façade with the porch, and the Byzantine compound dome with two rows of pendentives, are found at the Timișoara Orthodox Cathedral. From the Coronation Cathedral, Alba Iulia are found the arches, cornice, and the robust façade with side buttresses of the bell tower, as well the bell tower's façade on the Metropolitanate Hill, Bucharest built by Constantin Brâncoveanu. The portal with the bell tower's rosette and the porch resemble that of the Antim Monastery and the Cașin Church in Bucharest. The cathedral's façade architecture, achieves a synthesis between tradition and contemporaneity by incorporating national architectural elements such as Brâncovenesc porches, Transylvanian towers, and Moldavian niches (ro:ocnițe).

The Corinthian columns in the cathedral's porch feature a typology of Romanian Revival capital with Brâncovenesc acanthuses. At the capital's corners, the Ionic volutes are reduced in size, scrolling outward above the stylized acanthus leaves. The acanthus, being a leaf with thorns, carries within itself the symbol of the untainted earth and is likened to the thistle of Genesis 3:18. In the Mediterranean region, it is considered a symbol of enduring life, immortality and rebirth. The acanthus ornament is also found on the column base's scotia, emphasizing the durability of the bottom-up construction.

The People's Salvation Cathedral iconographer is Daniel Codrescu. Executed in the Neo-Byzantine style, the cathedral mosaics follow the iconographic plan to illustrate the historical basis of the Orthodox Church. Thus, the cathedral's iconography is structured to include: the Church of the Apostolic Age, rendered by the representation of the twelve Apostles; the Church of the Patristic Age, represented by holy fathers from the Greek, Syriac, Latin, and Slavic Churches; and the Romanian Orthodox Church, both old and contemporary. In addition to the saints from the universal church, the walls of the cathedral depict the great saints of the Romanian nation and the confessors saints from the Romanian communist prisons, such as fathers Stăniloae, Sofian, Cleopa, Partenie Gherasim, and others.

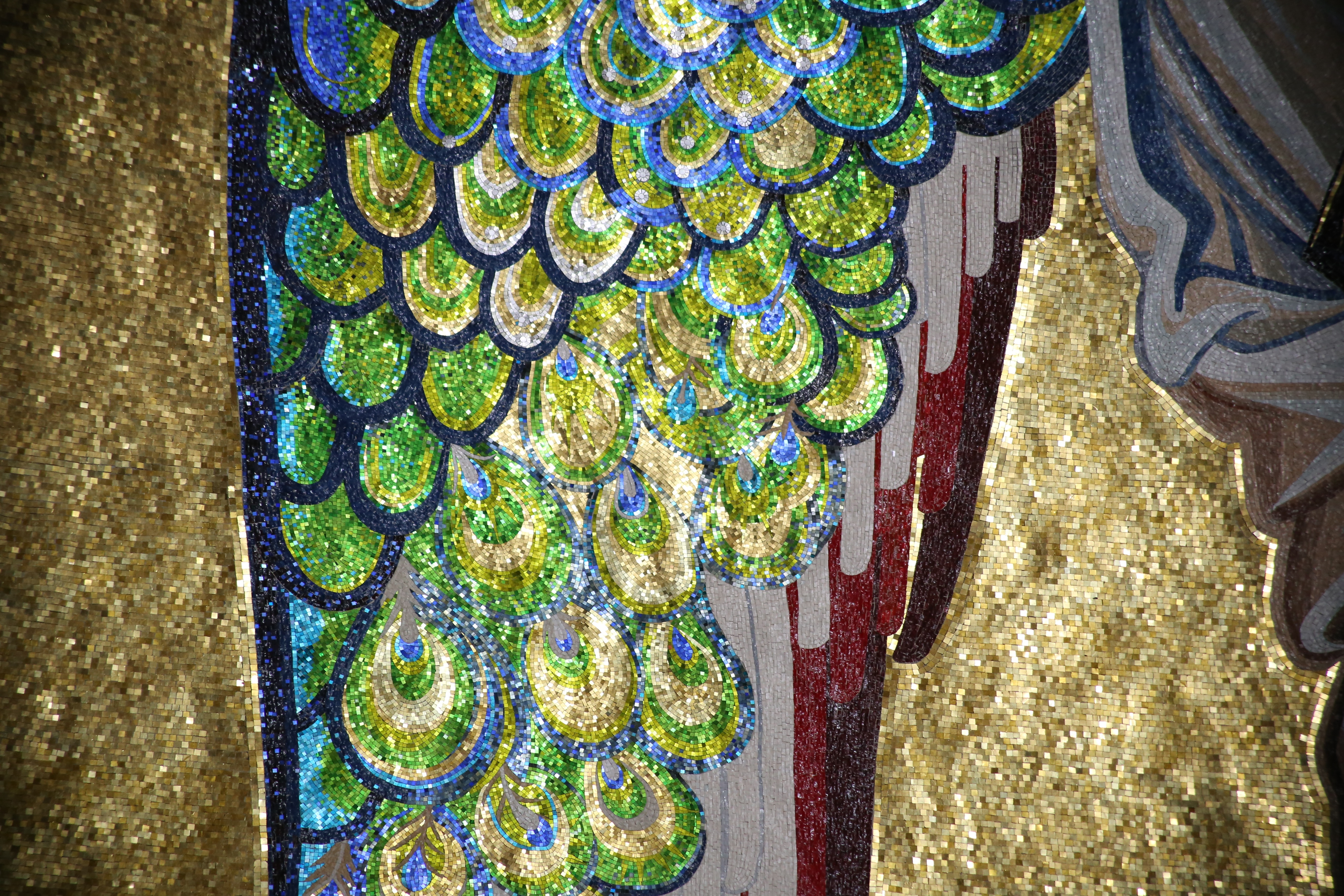
Archangel Michael (altar)

For the People's Salvation Cathedral mosaic, glass made in Venice is used. The shade of the gold glass was chosen based on the glass from St. Mark's Basilica, but with a lighter hue. The Murano glass is processed by the Venetian foundries Orsoni and Mosaici Donà Murano. The smalti from Orsoni has previously been used in the decoration of major landmarks such as St.Mark's Basilica, Sagrada Familia, Washington Basilica, and others. Carrara stone is also used, famous for being used in many Renaissance sculptures (such as Michelangelo's Pietà) and in the mosaic technique. Making one square meter of mosaic requires approximately 16 kg of material (about 10,000 tesserae), applied with a special cement-based adhesive. The People's Salvation Cathedral will ultimately require about 400 tons of tesserae, covering a total area of 25,000 square meters. The floral ornaments, shields, and bands that delimit the biblical scenes draw inspiration from several sources, including: St. Mark's Basilica, the Monreale and Cefalù Cathedrals in Sicily, the Baptistery of Neon in Ravenna, Hagia Sophia and the Chora Church in Istanbul, Hosios Loukas Monastery, Curtea de Argeș Cathedral, Trei Ierarhi Monastery, the Macca House in Bucharest, and the Ethnography Museum in Baia Mare, among others.

=== Nave ===
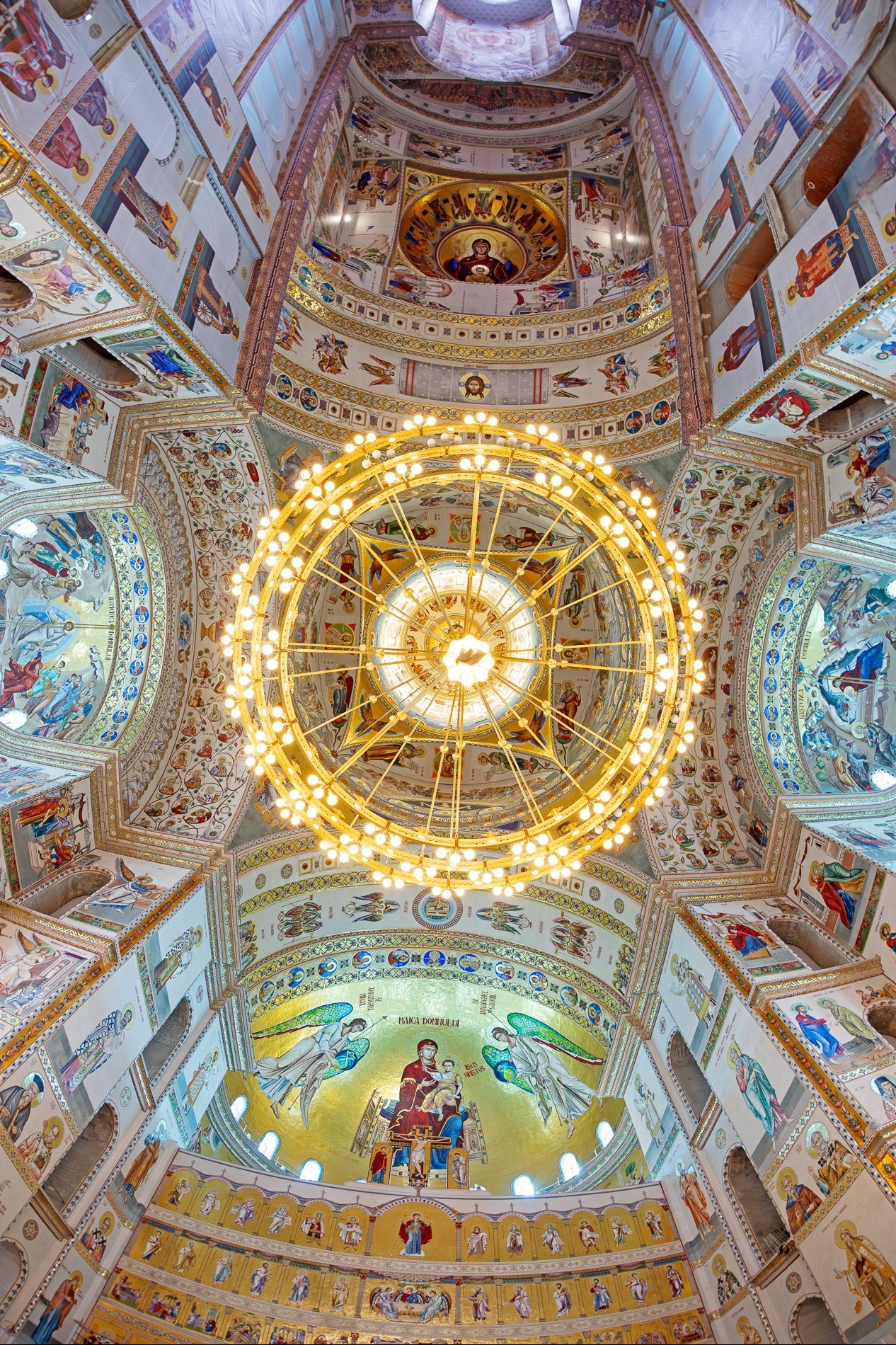

The vaulted nave reaches an interior height of 44 meters, making it the Orthodox church with the highest interior nave and ranking among the highest in the world. With a nave width of 25.7 meters (colonnades), the People's Salvation Cathedral has the second-widest nave in the world, surpassed only by St. Peter's Basilica in Vatican City (27 meters). While Hagia Sophia in Istanbul has a greater span (31 meters), it does not have a nave in the strict architectural sense. For comparison, the nave of the People's Salvation Cathedral covers about 2,600 square meters, measuring 78.3 meters (colonnade to iconostasis) by 65.1 meters (transept). The main hall of Hagia Sophia, by contrast, covers about 2,400 square meters, measuring 78.1 meters (250 Byzantine foot - without the altar) by 37.5 meters (120 Byzantine feet - transept). (Note: Certain sources vary, some indicating 250 ft inside, others indicating 250 ft with the walls outside (4-5 ft wall thickness). Byzantine foot derived from the ancient Greek foot (pous), the standard foot length in Byzantium seems to have been 0.3123 m, but in practice the length fluctuated between 0.308 and 0.320 m.) When the main cathedral doors and the iconostasis doors are opened, the visual distance between a person standing at the entrance (colonnade) and the center of the altar table is 106 meters. Also, a person standing in the middle of the nave will see the dome ceiling (Pantocrator) at the same height of 106 meters from the floor.

The floor of the cathedral is covered with Rușchița marble. This marble has been used for many famous buildings, including the Romanian Parliament Building, Milan Cathedral, the Hungarian Parliament Building, Istana Nurul Iman, etc. Even the eagle in the Oval Office at the White House, one of the American national symbols, is made of white Rușchița marble. The quarry is located in Caraș-Severin County, south of the Poiana Ruscă Mountains. The main marble types used for the cathedral are the white-yellow Rușchița Classico and the white-pinkish Rușchița Champagne. Vratsa marble from Bulgaria is used outside the cathedral, and the stone's hardness makes it ideal for window and door frames. Carrara marble is also utilized for interior decoration. Marble from Carrara is famously used for some of the most remarkable buildings in Ancient Rome, as well as other notable constructions such as the Siena Cathedral, the Legislative Palace of Uruguay, the Akshardham (New Delhi), and others.

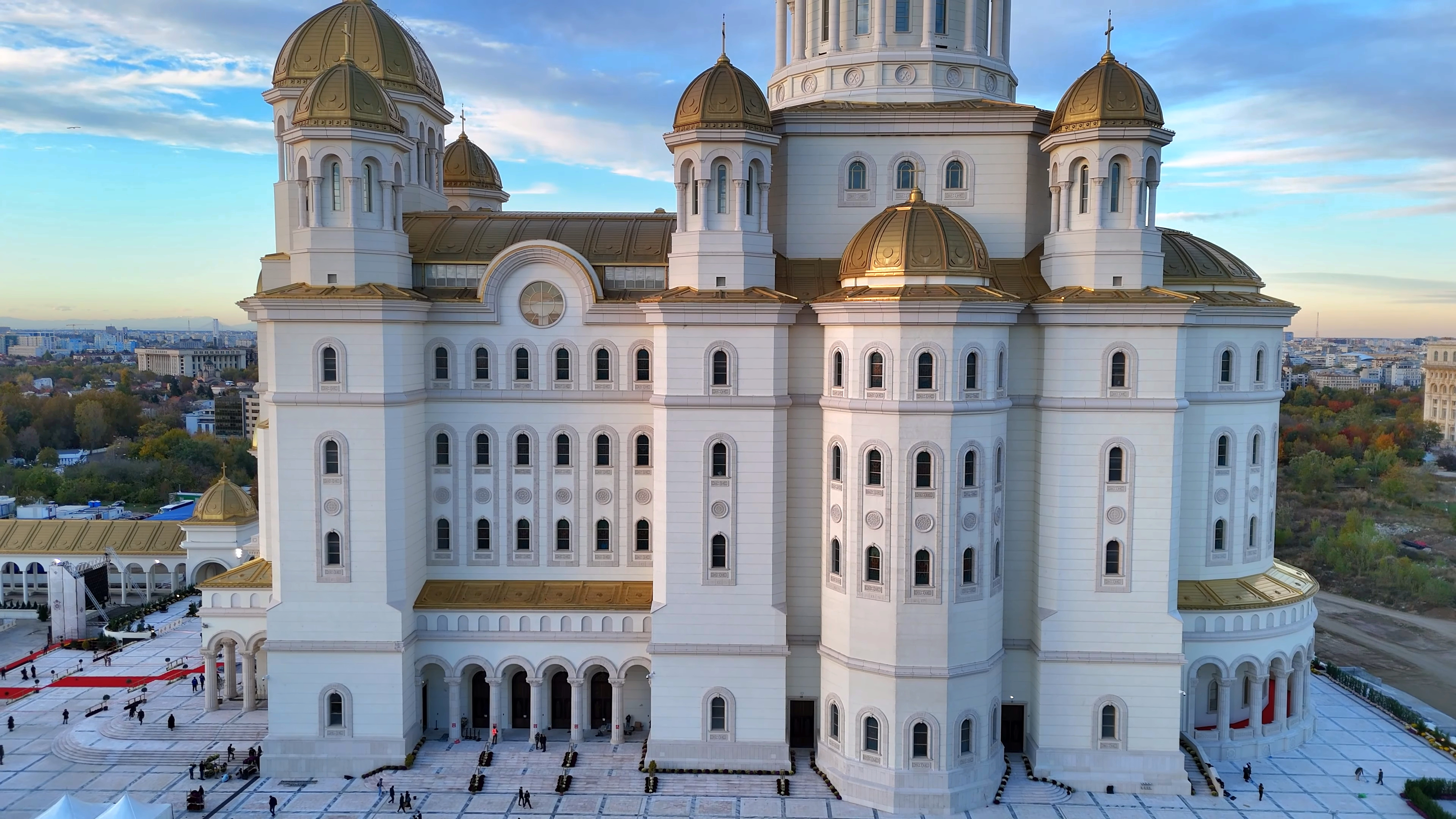

The National Cathedral has twenty-seven double-leaf doors, on which sixty-one bas-reliefs are depicted, namely, Jesus the Lord represented twice, the Theotokos, the two Archangels Michael and Gabriel, plus fifty-six saints, including over twenty Romanian saints. These 800-kilogram door leaves of stainless steel plated with patinated bronze, each measuring one meter wide and 5.5 meters high, were manufactured in Süßen by the Strassacker company, the same company which also created the bronze crosses mounted on the towers. The total cost of the twenty-seven double-leaf doors is estimated at around 11 million euros. The cathedral interior will be illuminated by four brass chandeliers, structured on three annular levels, with three of them measuring 6 meters in diameter and the dome chandelier measuring 7 meters. The chandeliers were produced by the Austrian company Orion, based on the Alt Wien model but with extensive modifications to achieve the necessary monumental aesthetic.

The cathedral’s largest window is the Ascension of Jesus stained-glass window at the main entrance, measuring 96 square meters and costing 200 thousand euros. It is 5.5 meters wide by 15 meters high, composed of twenty-nine segments made in Germany and reassembled in three months. Stained-glass artists Lucian Butucariu created the stained-glass in the altar, dome, and bell tower, while Victor Săraru created the stained-glass in the nave and narthex of the People's Salvation Cathedral. The works were partly inspired by several churches in Transylvania that feature Western influences. The People's Salvation Cathedral has a total of 396 windows. Their galvanized, arched frameworks, with stainless steel clamping systems, were manufactured in Belgium by the Reynaers company and electrochemically treated by anodizing. The frameworks are fitted with insulated glazing, consisting of two 6-millimeter-thick tempered safety glass panes made by Valras Prod in Ploiești, and as the third element, the stained-glass window made in Germany.

==== Transept and crossing ====
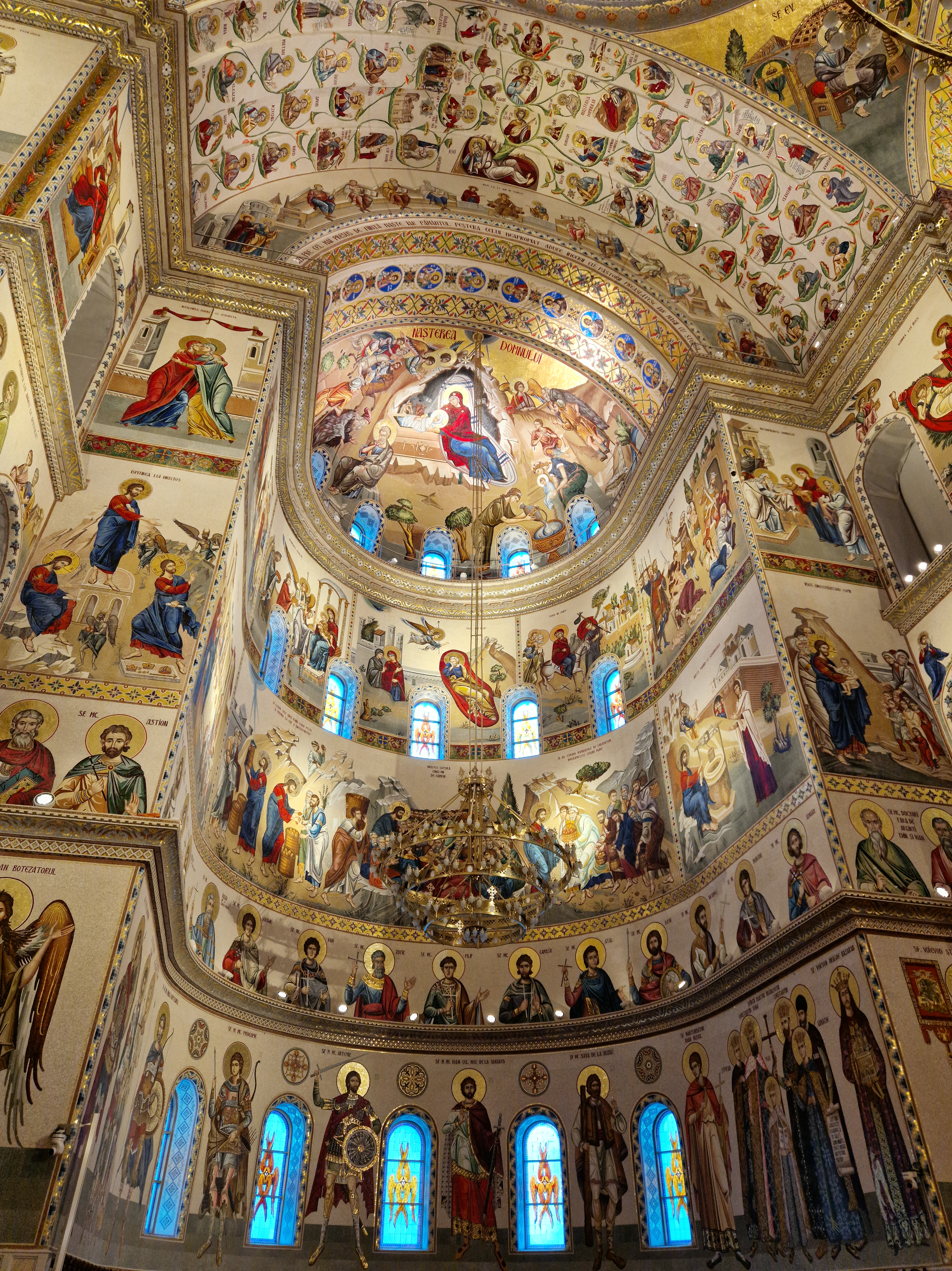
Southern apse

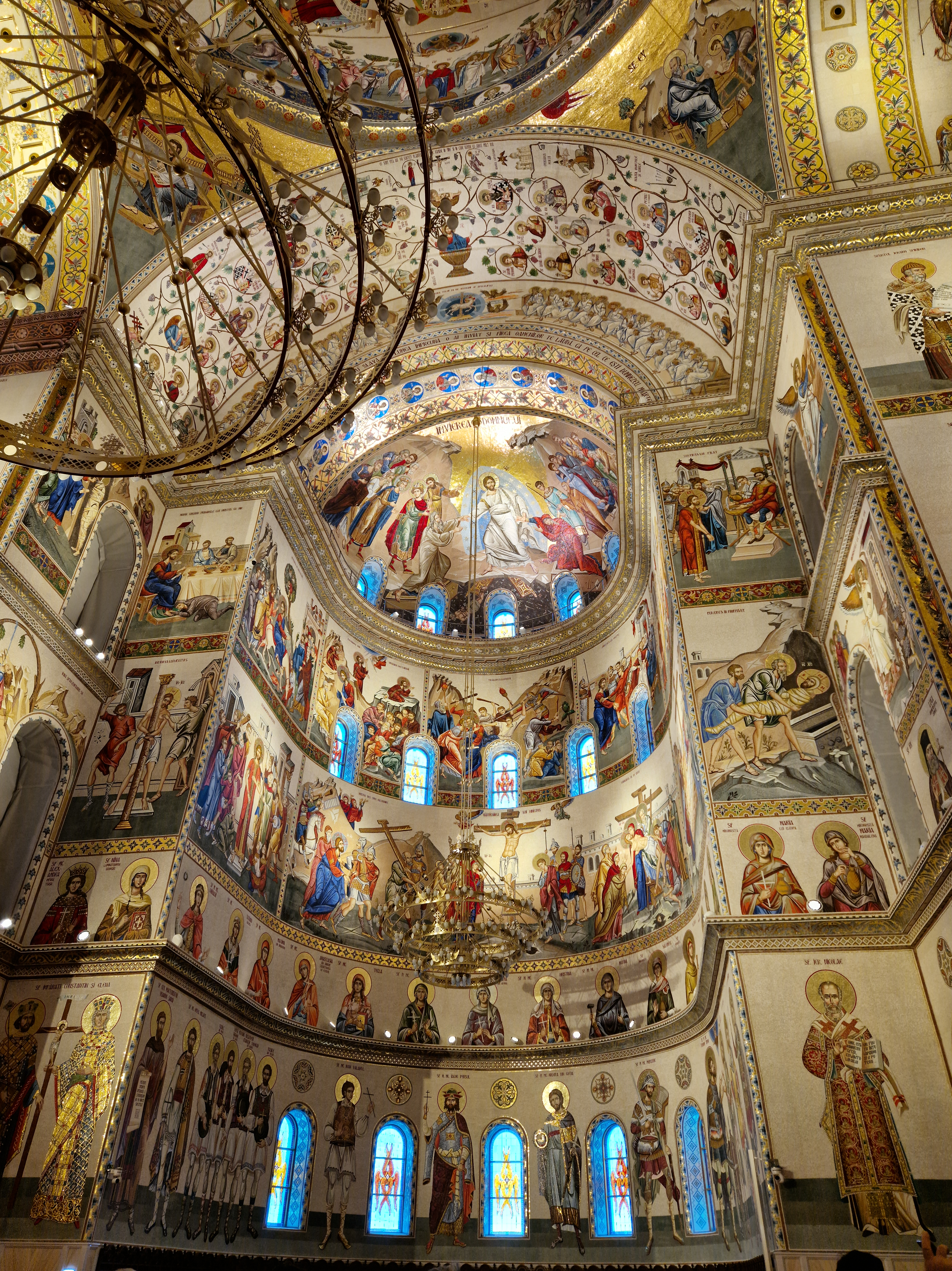
Northern Apse

The vaulted nave supporting the dome reaches a height of 40.35 meters, and the mosaics of the southern and northern apses were completed in 2024 and 2025, respectively. These, along with the two bays of the nave (running west-to-east) situated above the crossing, are decorated with about 7,000 square meters of mosaic. The main mosaics in the apses are the Nativity of Jesus (south) and the Resurrection of Jesus (north), the latter based on the Anastasis iconography typical of the Chora Church, each of these mosaics measuring 178 square meters.

The iconographic registries of the two apses is structured in four registers below the conch and three above. The two upper registers of the southern hemicycle feature family themes and various miracles of the Savior, while the corresponding two upper registers of the northern hemicycle are dedicated to the holy Passion of Jesus. The two lowest registers of both the southern and northern hemicycles depict Christian martyrs and Romanian rulers. The south apse's vaults contain three distinct registers: Christian martyrs (lower), Jesus at the age of twelve in the temple (middle), and the Tree of Jesse (upper). The latter composition represents the genealogy of Jesus and is inspired by the exterior iconography of several churches in Bukovina, such as the Sucevița Monastery. The north apse's vaults similarly contain three registers: Christian martyrs (lower), the twenty-four Elders offering praise from the Apocalypse – Revelation 4:4 (middle), and the evangelical scene "I am the vine, you are the branches" – John 15:5 (upper). Along the edge (intrados) of the southern lower vault is inscribed the Nativity Kontakion (Today the Virgin; third tone) by Romanos the Melodist, while the northern lower vault features the Resurrection Kontakion (As God, You resurrected; first tone).

The triumphal vault includes the main mosaic of the Hetoimasia, along with iconographic representations of twelve Old Testament Prophets and the heavenly powers: Cherubim, Seraphim and Angels. The prophets, shown in 1.8-meter medallions, hold symbolic representations in their hands, foreshadowing the Theotokos and the incarnation of the Lord Jesus Christ. The Hetoimasia represents the throne of the Last Judgment, and historically an empty throne with a Gospel Book on it was placed in the chamber of church councils to represent Christ, at the First Council of Ephesus in 431. The theme is inspired by the Voroneț Monastery exterior (1547) and the Monreale Cathedral's apse (12th-century). Psalm 89:14 (gr-Ps.88:14-15) is inscribed in a ring shape around the Hetoimasia mosaic. On the vault between the nave and the narthex, the central image placed alongside the angelic powers, is the Saviour's Veil mosaic. This theme is derived from churches in northern Moldova, such as Moldovița, as well as from the Vardzia cave monastery in Georgia.

==== Narthex ====
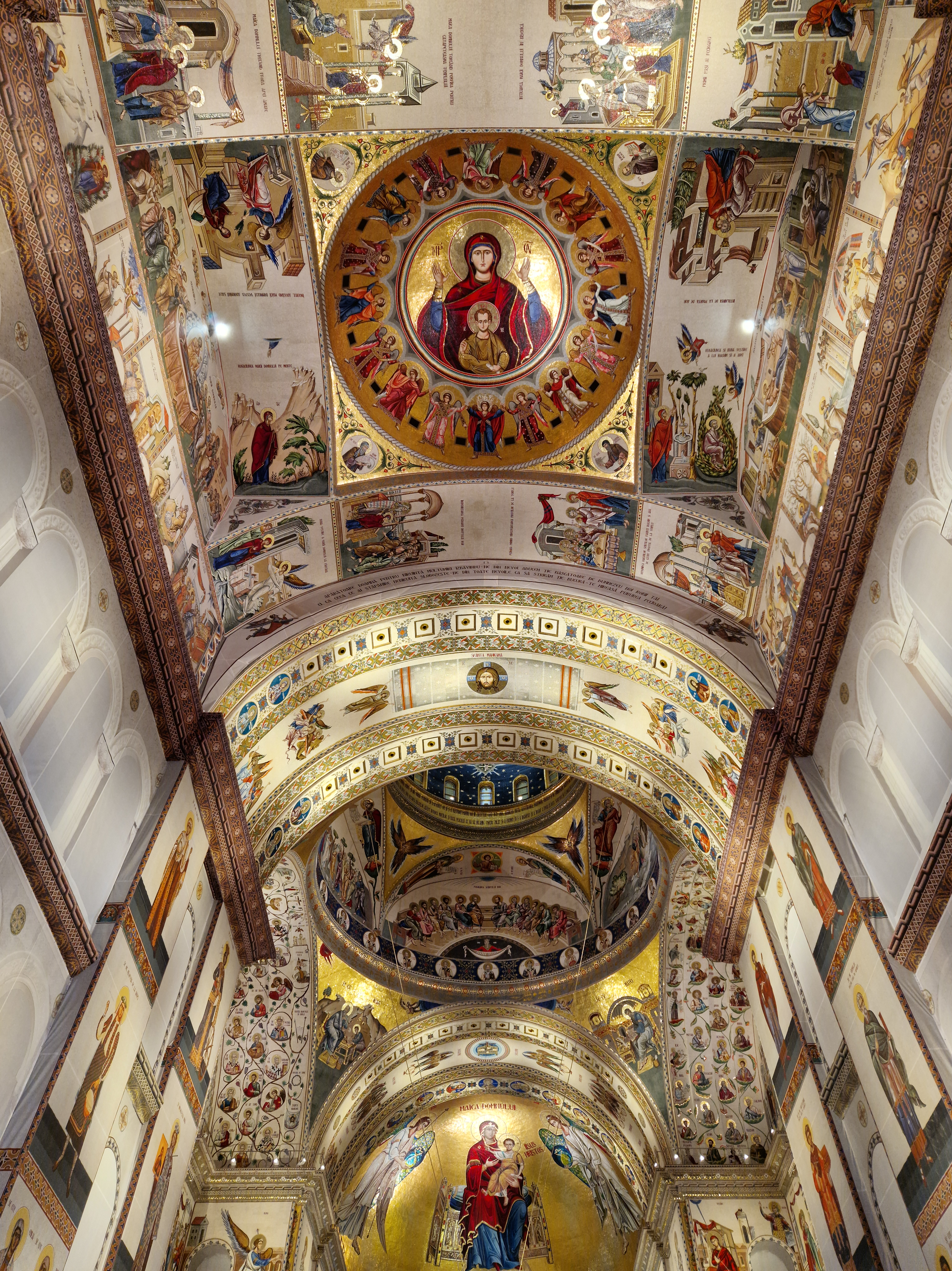

Dominating the narthex dome at about 50 meters high is the Oranta mosaic, depicted within a glory supported by sixteen radially disposed archangels. The pendentives below feature medallions of four hymnographer saints: Cosmas the Melodist (southeast), Joseph the Hymnographer (southwest), John of Damascus (northwest), and Romanos the Melodist (northeast) who is the author of the Nativity Kontakion. The Oranta theme is derived from the monasteries of Voroneț, Humor, and Probota, having been developed in Northern Moldavia.

On the vaults and lunettes below the dome, up to 44 meters in height, the course of the Virgin Mary's life is iconographically represented between the two cardinal points of her earthly existence, respectively the Nativity of the Theotokos on the south side and the Dormition of the Theotokos (Koimesis) on the north side. The nativity theme is inspired by the Nativity of the Theotokos fresco from the Studenica Monastery (12th-century) and the Chora Church mosaics (14th-century) from the life of Mary cycle, specifically the themes Nativity of the Theotokos and "The Virgin caressed by her parents". Among the Twelve Great Feasts, these feasts mark the beginning and the end of the liturgical year. On the intrados of the large vaults surrounding the narthex, the Annunciation Kontakion (en-Champion Leader; ro-Lady Protector) is inscribed on the east side, while the Axion Estin (It is Truly Meet) hymn is inscribed on the west side.

In the western part of the narthex, the perimeter walls will depict the seven Ecumenical Councils, paying homage to the 1700th anniversary of the first council of Nicaea. These councils are closely connected to the Theotokos and the theme of God's Incarnation. The iconography of the councils is inspired by the monasteries of Bukovina, where this theme is well developed. The iconography in the choir-loft area presents the eschatological theme of the forgiveness of sins and the hope of inheriting heaven. The choir-loft vault will feature the themes of the Parousia along with All Saints' Sunday. On the perimeter wall of the stained-glass window will be the theme "Let Everything That Hath Breath Praise the Lord" (Laudate Ps.148-150). The north and south walls of the bay will feature the themes of The Ladder of Divine Ascent taken from the Sucevița and Râșca monasteries, and the Aerial toll house.

Below the lunettes, the lower register of the north-south walls, located between the small windows, features iconography of the Old Testament prophecies concerning the Theotokos and the Savior's sinless Incarnation. The bottom registers of the narthex walls will be occupied predominantly by the Romanian saints canonized in 2025, such as the saints Arsenie Boca, ro:Paisie Olaru, Cleopa Ilie, and others.

=== Dome ===
==== Exterior ====
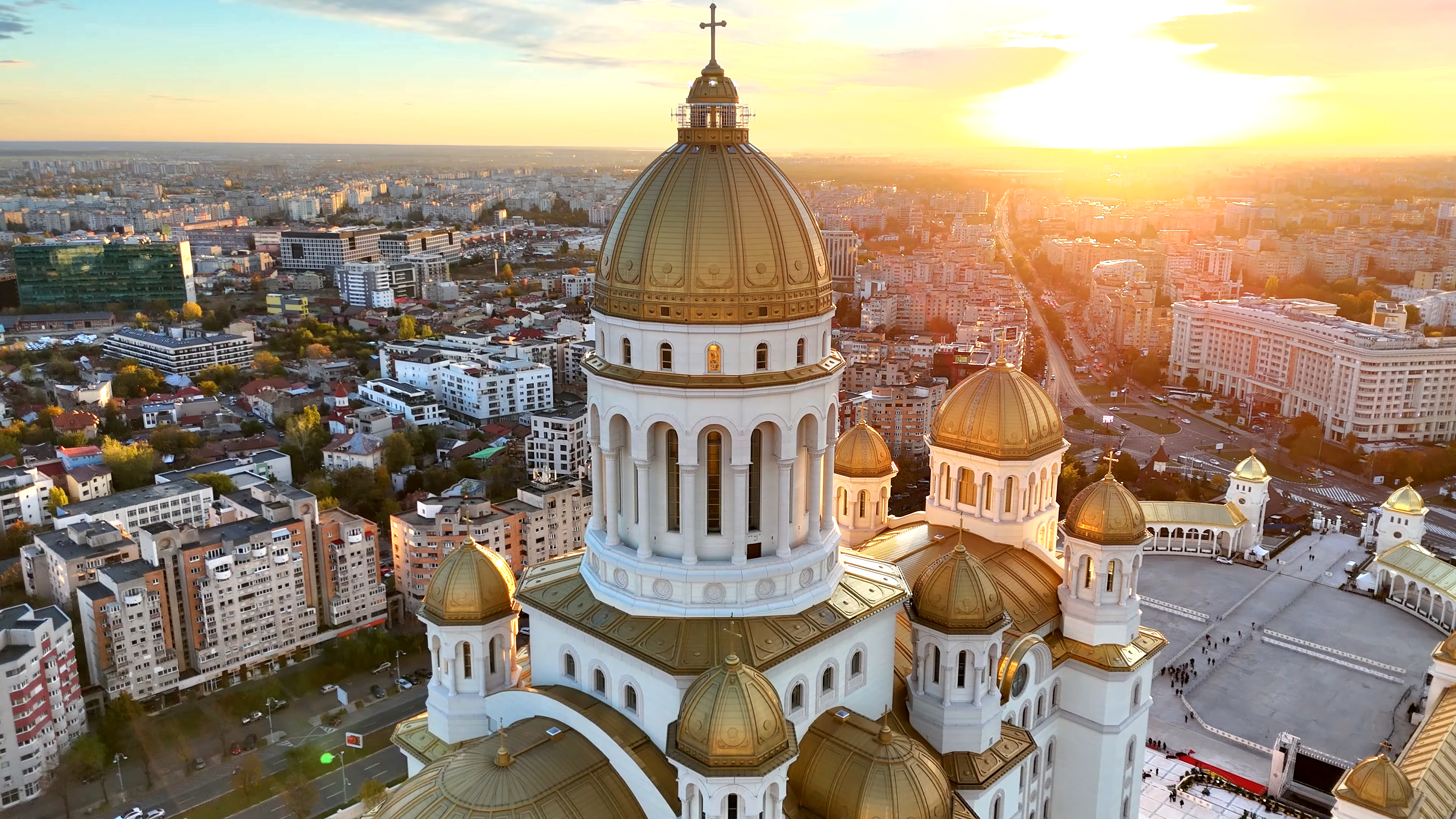
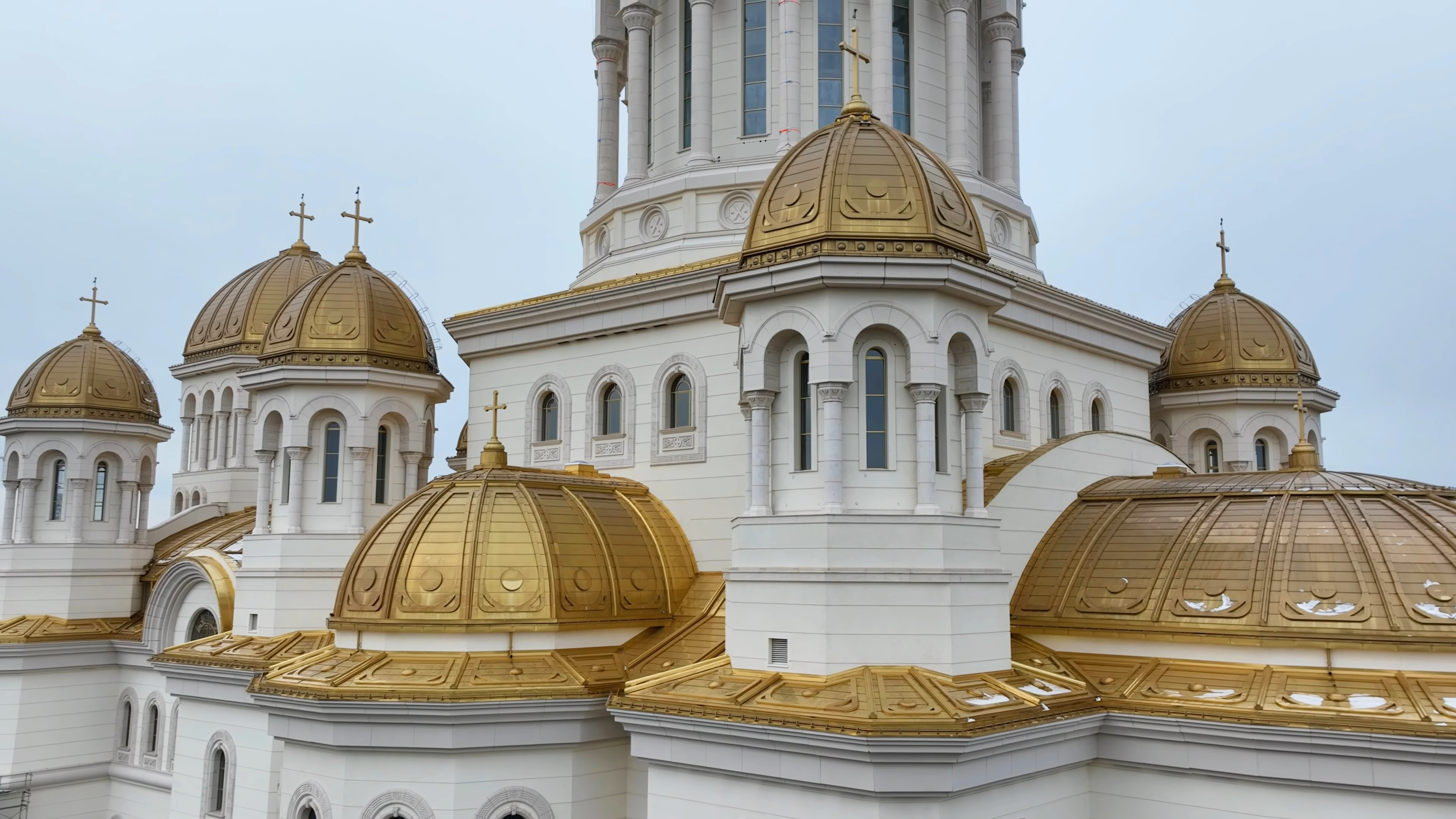
Dome, towers and bell tower

The dominant feature of the cathedral is its huge elongated dome, which reaches a total height of 133 meters (ground - top cross). This makes it the third tallest domed church in the world, after the Basilica of Our Lady of Peace and St. Peter's Basilica. The cathedral also boasts the world's tallest exterior dome without the lantern-cross, standing at 120.3 meters, and at the top of the lantern, the cathedral rises to 126.3 meters from the ground. The Pantocrator cupola has an interior height of 106.3 meters from the floor, surpassing the interior dome height of St. Peter's Basilica, which measures 101.8 meters from the basilica's floor. The cupola's diameter is 16.8 meters inside, with 18 meters of concrete forming a hemispherical shape, and the concrete dome was completed on 24 May 2019. The dome is surrounded by six towers, and at the western end is the bell tower (campanile), which stands 86.8 meters tall (without a cross), containing the world's largest free-swinging church bell.

The overall style is Romanian revival, a synthesis that incorporates Renaissance revival through the high dome, Romanesque through the façade with its towers, and Neo-Byzantine through the bell tower. Both the dome and the hexadecagonal outer cupola are features inspired by the tempietto shape of St. Peter's Basilica. The outer dome's façade shares similarities with the northern façade and choir of the Sacré-Cœur Basilica, Paris. The bell tower's façade is also found at the Saint Alexander Nevsky Cathedral, Sofia. The dome's peristyle, surrounded by sixteen arches, is inspired by the Dormition of the Theotokos Cathedral, Cluj-Napoca.

The dome is set on a rectangular-octagonal drum, which covers an area of 1,350 square meters. A row of circular shields, adorned with the Cross of Saint Andrew, encircles the dome. The main accessible part for visitors is the dome's peristyle with sixteen arches, which is supported by a continuous colonnade measuring 93 meters in circumference and 29.4 meters in diameter. The arcades are supported by scallop-shaped capitals of the simplified Corinthian order. Large stained glass windows, mounted around the dome, each composed of seven modules, measure 11.45 meters high by 1.35 meters wide. Above the peristyle is the belvedere dome, surrounded by a balustraded balcony at a height of 97.8 meters from the ground, positioned behind small semi-oval windows.

Above this attic rises the cupola, which is covered with gilded copper and ribbed in accordance with the columns' spacing. The outer cupola is pierced by sixteen small skylights just below the lantern, but these are barely visible to an onlooker from the ground level. The inner cupola-lantern connection is achieved by a spiral metallized staircase. The roofing sheet used for the cathedral is an CuAl5Zn5Sn1 special brass alloy, branded as Tecu Gold and supplied by the German company KME. With a composition of 91.55% copper, 4% aluminium, 4% zinc, and 0.3% tin, the Tecu Gold has a slightly darker shade than the Nordic gold alloy found in euro cents. The total roofing area used for the cathedral and its annexes is 19,913 square meters, and it cost about 1.7 million euros.

==== Interior ====
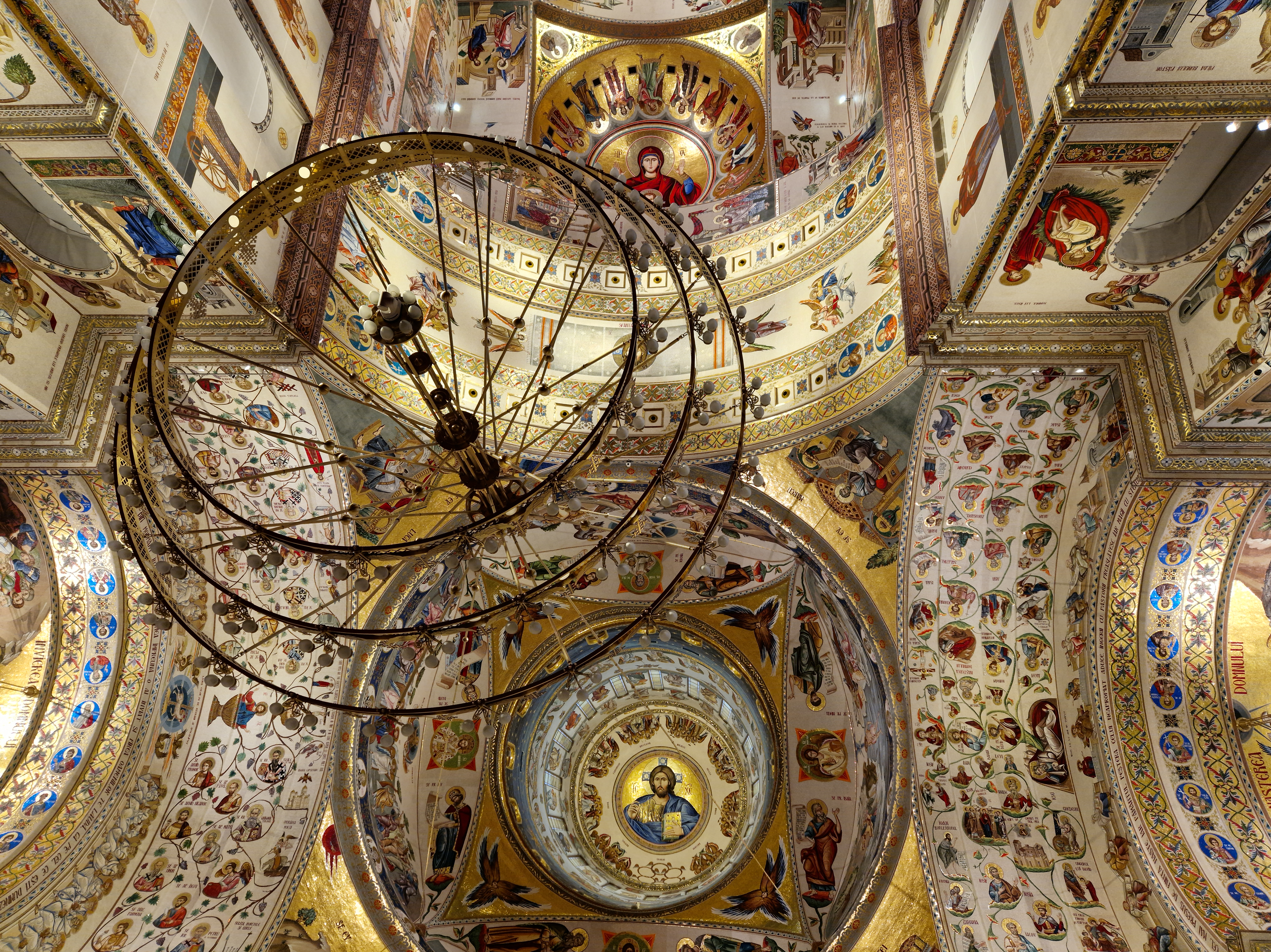

The inner dome consists of two parts supported by two rows of pendentives, covering a total area of 4,200 square meters of mosaic, and the highest point of the dome's ceiling rises 106.25 meters above the floor of the nave. The upper dome, covering 2,830 square meters with a diameter of 16.8 meters, is supported by pendentives at a height of 52.75 meters. It features mosaics depicting: Christ Pantocrator; registers of the nine heavenly powers; the sixteen-fold repetition of Holy, a reference to the Orthodox Trisagion; thirty-two apostles and prophets; the angelic liturgy with angels bearing the Epitaphios on their shoulders; and the cosmos theme with the sun, moon, and stars. The lower dome, with a diameter of 25.2 meters and an area of 1,370 square meters, is supported by pendentives at a height of 40.35 meters. It includes the main scenes of the great feasts: the Ascension of Jesus (north), the Transfiguration of Jesus (west), the Baptism of Jesus (south), and the Descent of the Holy Spirit (east), each of these mosaics measuring 160 square meters. The Seraphim depicted on the dome's pendentives refer to the Seraphim on the pendentives of Hagia Sophia in Istanbul.

The dome features a vernacular North-Moldavian vaulting system, structured as two overlapping rhombuses that create an eight-pendentive vault pattern. The small vaults between the pendentives convey an eschatological message consistent with the depiction of the Pantocrator in Tetramorph: the Eternal High Priest, Emmanuel, the Angel of Great Counsel, and the Ancient of Days. According to Daniel Codrescu, the cathedral's iconographer, "the iconographic ensemble of the Pantocrator dome, integrated into a theological vision, is a poetic meditation on how nature itself becomes a kind of silent yet eloquent sermon concerning the Creator". Between the angelic liturgy and the cosmic themes, two Psalms are inscribed in a ring-shaped form, represented in the iconographic ensemble from left to right: Psalm 148:1 with 148:3 and Psalm 19:1-2 (gr-Ps.18:1-2). The Nicene Creed is inscribed on the annular drum, at the junction of the upper and lower domes.

Centered against the cosmos' background is the Cross of Constantine the Great, inscribed with Matthew 24:30 about the sign of the Son of Man. Constantine ended the Tetrarchy and paved the way for the Christianization of the Roman Empire. This cross is inspired by the fresco in the narthex dome of the Saint Rousanou Monastery in Meteora and the mosaic in the apse of the Saint Sophia Cathedral, Kyiv. The iconographic theme of the sun and moon is found mainly in the Genesis mosaic in the atrium of St. Mark's Basilica in Venice, the narthex dome of Saint Rousanou Monastery in Meteora, at the entrance to Kykkos Monastery in Cyprus, and in some monasteries in Bukovina.

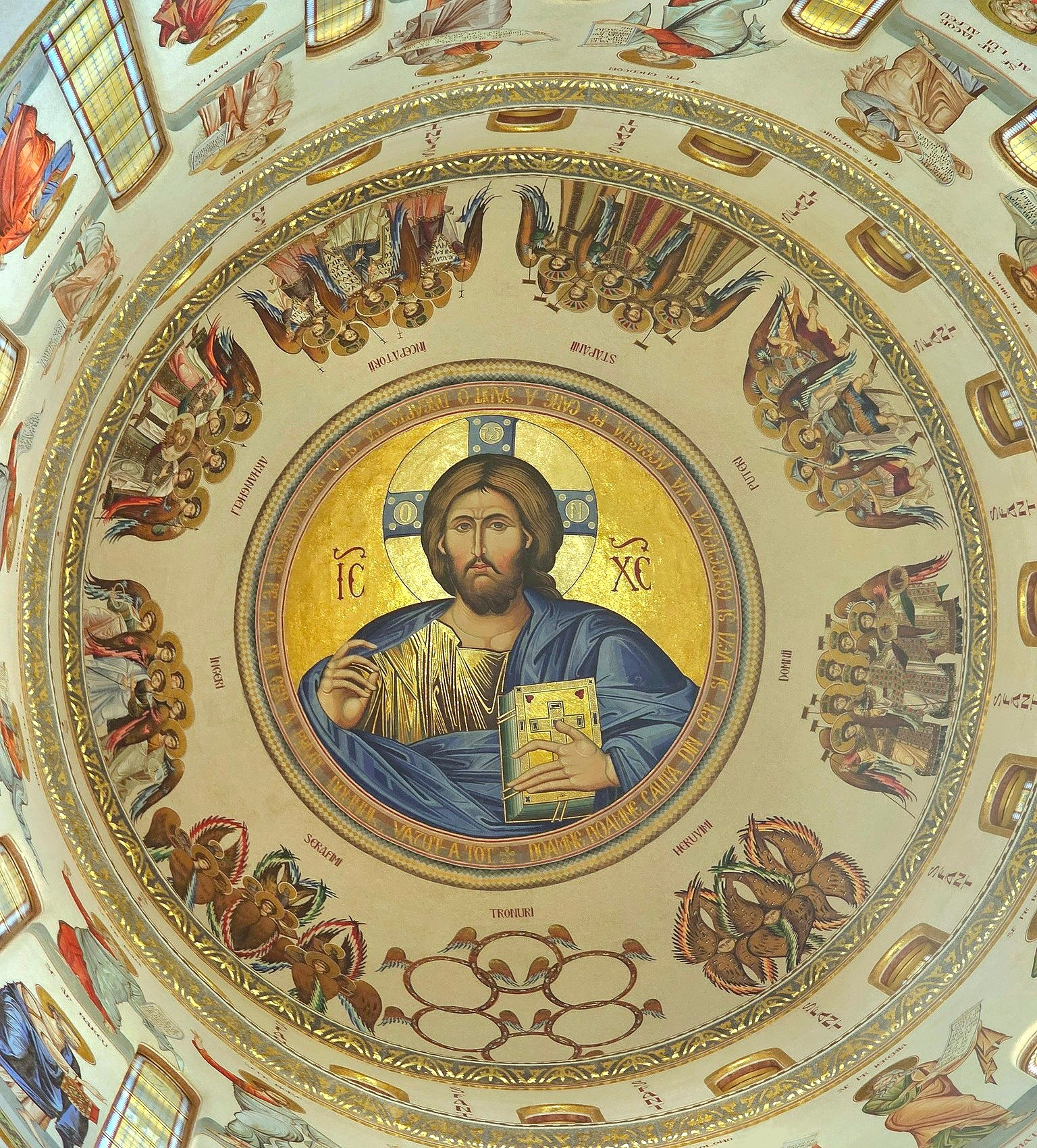
Pantocrator

The Pantocrator cupola covers about 450 square meters, and of this area, the Pantocrator mosaic accounts for 150 square meters, with the remaining surface dedicated to the mosaic of the nine heavenly powers. The Pantocrator mosaic, with a diameter of 12 meters and a facial span of 4.5 meters, was created between 2024 and 2025 and required 2.4 tons of tesserae. Christ is depicted wearing a blue mantle and a purple-yellow robe, symbolizing His strength, austerity, and almightiness as the King of kings. The arched eyebrows accentuate the horizontal lines of the arms, and the nose intersects these horizontal lines, creating a symbolic cross. Two Psalms are inscribed in a ring shape around the Pantocrator mosaic, represented in the iconographic ensemble from left to right: Psalm 80:14-15 (gr-Ps.79:15-16) and Psalm 33:13 (gr-Ps.32:13). The Pantocrator mosaic is mainly inspired by the Deisis mosaic in Hagia Sophia (1261), the one in the southern dome of the Chora Church (14th century), the one in the central dome of the Pammakaristos Church (13th century), all from Istanbul, and the Pantocrator fresco from Panagia tou Araka (1192) in Cyprus.

=== Altar ===
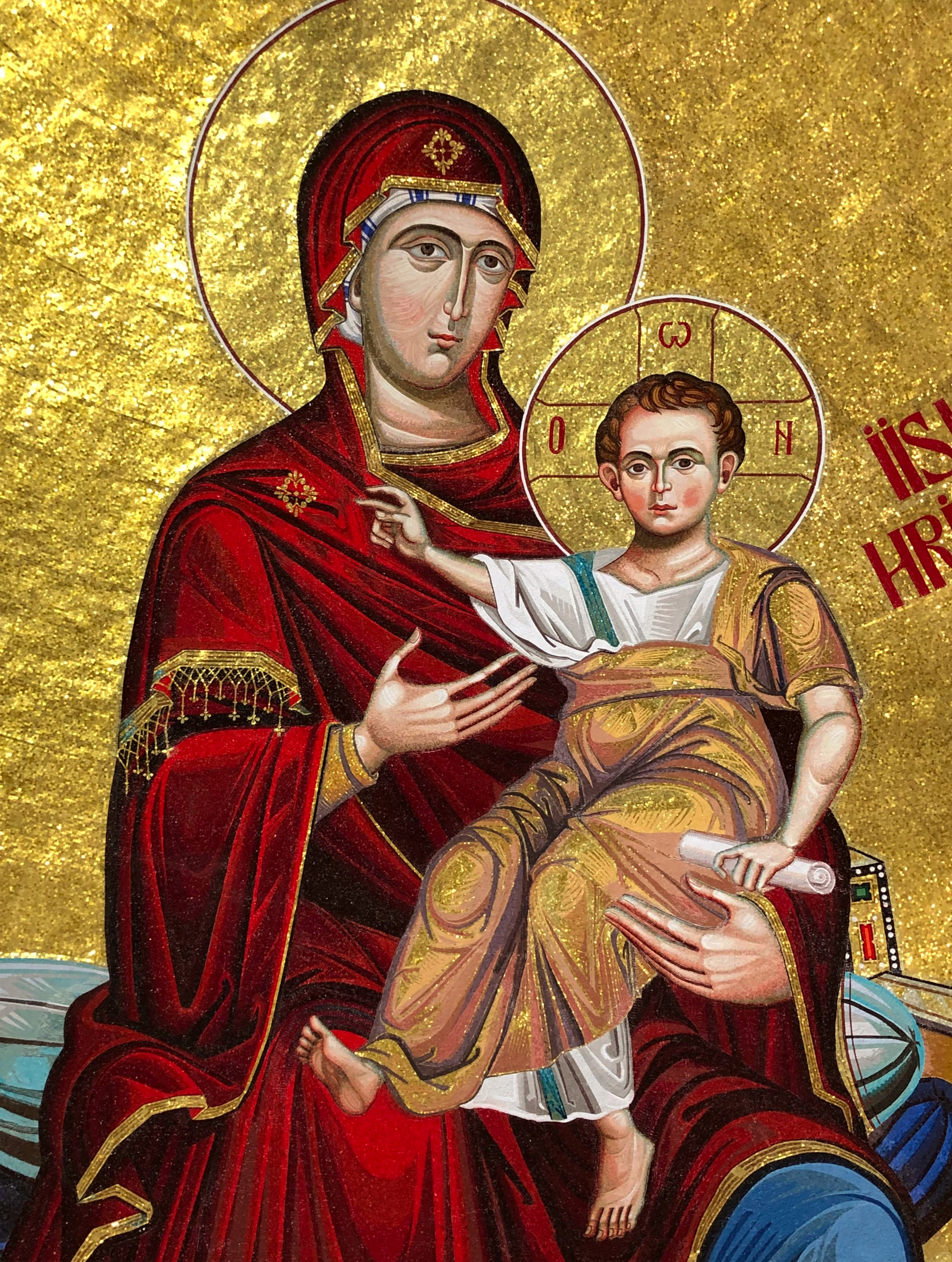
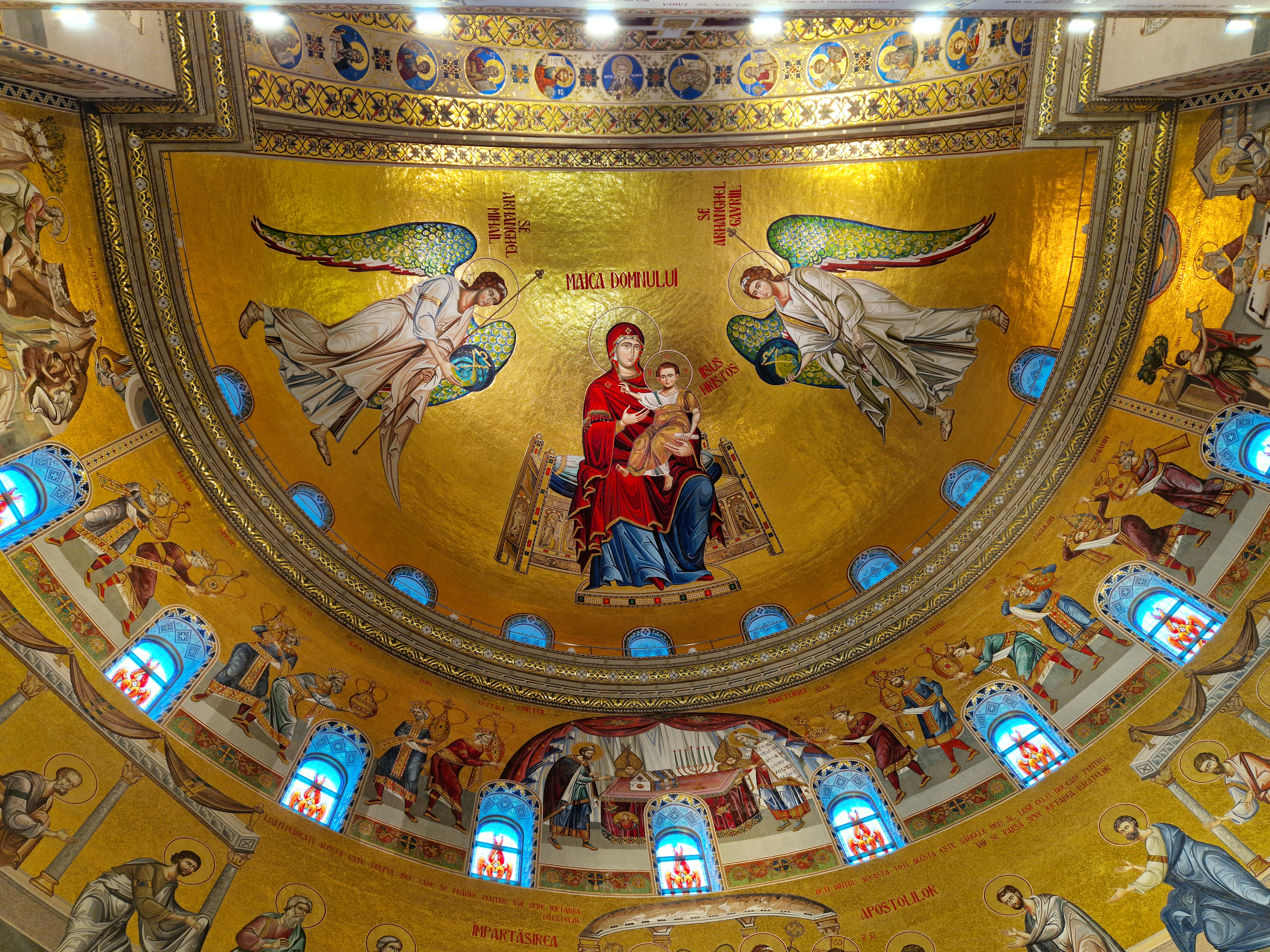

The vaulted altar apse reaches an interior height of 42.2 meters from the cathedral floor, and the altar's mosaic decoration, including its ambulatory and the iconostasis, covers about 3,400 square meters. The altar floor, where the Divine Liturgy is held, has an area of 300 square meters. The altar's iconography, excluding the iconostasis, comprises three sections: the apse, the altar hemicycle with three central registers, and the vestment wall.

The Theotokos Platytera mosaic (higher than the heavens) was completed in the altar apse on 7 May 2019. It stands as the largest Theotokos mosaic in the world, measuring 16 meters high and covering 150 square meters, including the throne. One million mosaic tesserae were used to create the Platytera, with nine different shades of red dedicated to the Mother of God's mantle. Below the Theotokos Platytera icon are nine windows, which allow light to enter, symbolizing the nine biblical odes and emphasizing the description of the Queen of Heavens. The Theotokos is flanked by the archangels Michael and Gabriel, each measuring 13 meters high and 5 meters wide, with wings 10 meters in length. The entire altar apse mosaic was completed in June 2020, covering an area of about 850 square meters.

One of the initial ideas was to create a Theotokos mosaic similar to the one in Hagia Sophia, Istanbul, but on a grander scale. Following the conversion of the Hagia Sophia into a mosque, the coordinator of the iconographers' team, Daniel Codrescu, expressed his hope that the Theotokos of the National Cathedral in Bucharest would symbolically succeed the one in Constantinople. Codrescu explained that the icon is a synthesis "according to the Romanian soul", incorporating elements from several renowned icons. Among the sources, the iconography of the Theotokos Enthroned following the 16th-century Cretan school, can be found in the Gregoriou Monastery on Mount Athos. The intense gaze of the Christ Child's face is based on the iconography of Emmanuel Lambardos, the fresco "Christ Teaching in the Temple" in the church of Hagia Sophia, Trabzon, and the fresco above the entrance to Arbore Church's porch. The mosaic from the late 6th-century apse of the Byzantine church Panagia Angeloktisti in the village of Kiti, Cyprus, is also notable. The angels hold a scepter and a globe, symbolizing the offering of earthly dominion to Christ and the Virgin. The angels' wings appear to be crafted from peacock feathers, a symbol of eternal life, and the rotulus in the Christ Child's left hand represents the supreme law.

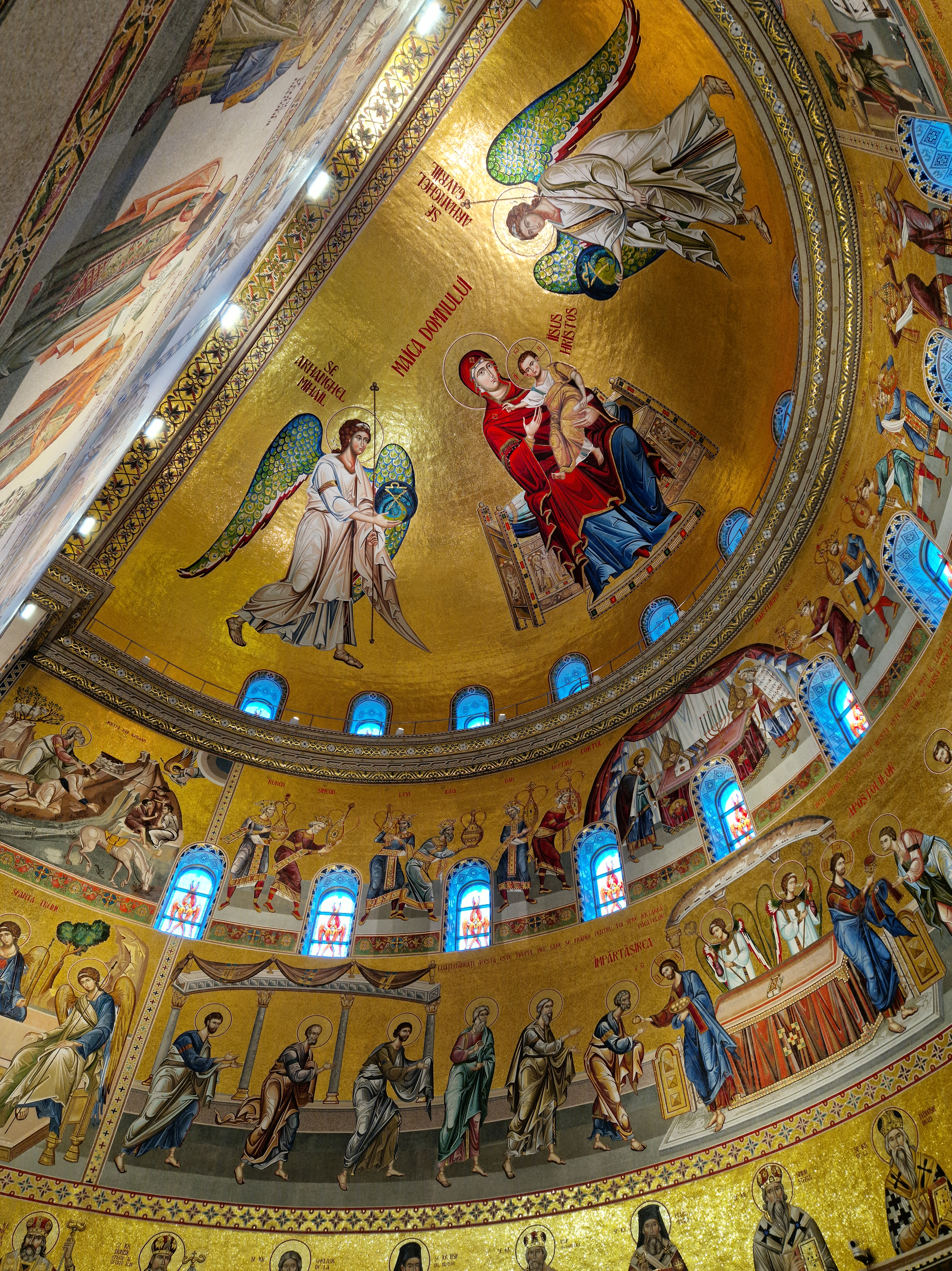
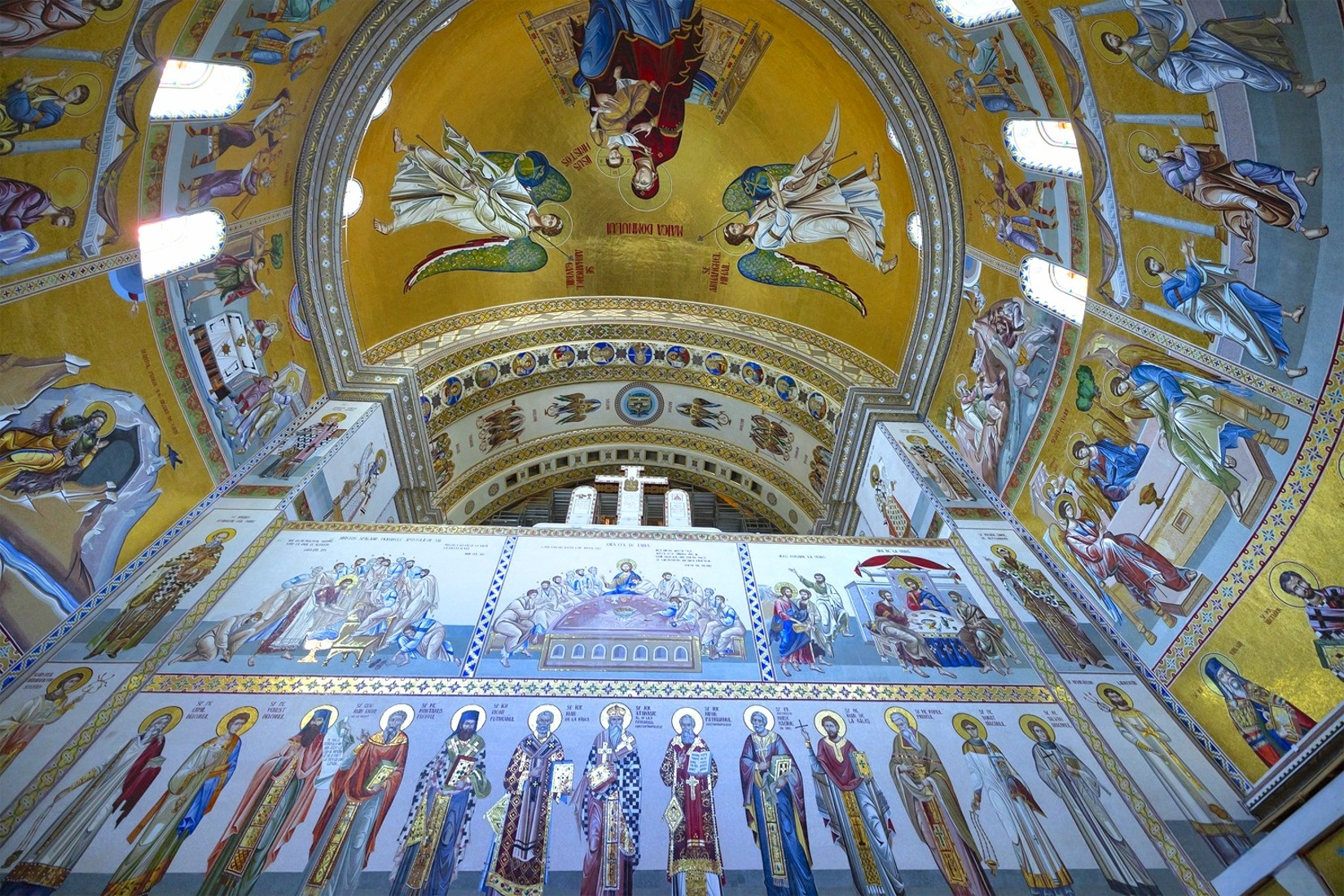

The upper register of the hemicycle centrally features the Tabernacle of the Congregation, which foreshadowed the Mother of God in the Old Testament. This biblical scene is inspired by 14th-century Byzantine churches, specifically Saint Nicholas in Curtea de Argeş and Holy Apostles in Thessaloniki. Flanking the central scene are two Old Testament scenes: Abraham's Sacrifice on the left and Melchizedek’s offering of Tribute on the right. The latter scene is adapted from the Basilica of Sant'Apollinare in Classe, Ravenna. The middle register centrally depicts the establishment of the New Testament through the Partaking of the Apostles (Communion of the Apostles). On the left is the Holy Trinity in the form of Abraham's Hospitality, and on the right is the Prophet Elijah being fed by ravens. The Apostles’ Partaking mosaic measures 22 meters in length by 7 meters in height, with the Savior figure being 4 meters tall. Judas is depicted with his back turned to the Savior, his halo detached behind him, and iconographic detail taken from Sucevița Monastery. Among the sources of inspiration include the mosaic in the Saint Sophia Cathedral in Kyiv (11th century), along with its museum, and the fresco in the Church of St. George, Staro Nagoričane.

The lowest register is dedicated to eighteen Romanian saint hierarchs, and the final section of the altar is the vestment wall, which includes nine stained-glass windows depicting saints. The main mosaic in the altar ambulatory is the Angel of Great Counsel (en-Isaiah 9:6; gr-Isaiah 9:5). This depiction is inspired by the Angel of Wisdom from Visoki Dečani Monastery, the Christ Pantocrator from Sant'Angelo in Formis, and the 14th-century Archangel Michael icon from the Byzantine Museum in Athens. This is an eschatological theme where the rotulus and the concave diamond halo, by emphasizing the Ascension's mandorla, highlight the message that the world must be prepared for the Second Coming of Christ the Lord.

The soleas in front of the iconostasis, including its seven steps, is 12 meters wide and covers 300 square meters. The bema, which comprises the altar and the soleas, accounts for 600 square meters of liturgical space, expanding to over 700 square meters when including the altar ambulatory. The floor of the altar is covered with marble and Rușchița stone. The marble models used include Muse Campagne, Caffe Latte, Sun Red, White Sivec, White Onyx, and Yellow Onyx. Relic fragments of Saint Martyr Constantin Brâncoveanu and the martyrs of Niculițel are placed beneath the Holy Table of the altar. Additionally, a list containing 350,000 names of Romanian heroes from the First and Second World Wars is placed inside the Holy Table.

==== Iconostasis ====
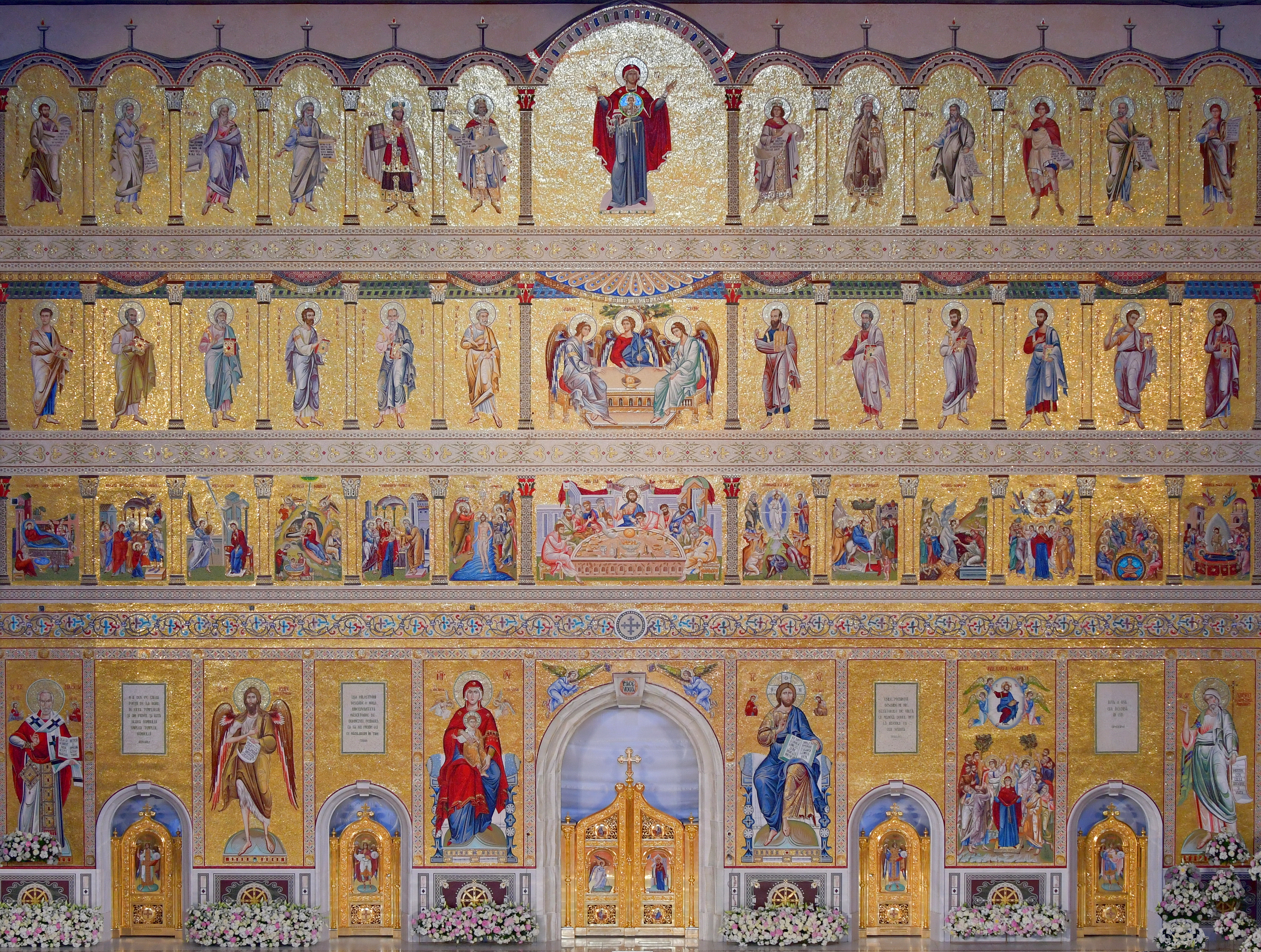

The iconostasis of the People's Salvation Cathedral is the largest Orthodox iconostasis in the world, measuring 23.8 meters long and 17.1 meters high. On one side, the iconostasis features a 407-square-meter mosaic (wall-to-wall), composed of over 4 million tesserae weighing 8 tons, and with adhesive 10 tons. Along with the thickened side edges, the entire 1.26-meter-thick structure with over 800 square meters of mosaic on both sides reaches 24.3 meters in length, and the whole structure, including ornaments and the crucifix, weighs around 1,300 tons. The royal doors has an inner vaulted opening measuring 4.28 meters high by 2.5 meters wide. Its framework is covered with 12.4 tons of Onyx, a stone sourced from Iran that adorns the doors of the iconostasis. Ancient in origin, Onyx is notably the first gemstone mentioned in the Old Testament, found in the Garden of Eden (Genesis 2:12).

A team of over 45 mosaic and fresco specialists worked for ten months to create the cathedral's iconostasis, led by iconographer Daniel Codrescu. The team originally planned to use marble frames for each large icon, but this idea was abandoned because the material's weight posed a seismic risk that could have compromised the iconostasis's structural integrity. Consequently, the iconostasis was crafted entirely from mosaic in the Byzantine style. Iconographer Daniel Codrescu stated: "Everything is meticulously crafted in the smallest details. The team tried to take the craftsmanship to another level of greatness. With the help of God, this monumental work is a gift to the Centenary of Romania. This iconostasis is the summary of the kingdom of heavens". The front of the iconostasis features 45 icons with 130 portraits placed across four registers. The first register holds six royal icons, each measuring 2.15 meters wide by 3.75 meters high; the second features the Last Supper (center) and the twelve Great Feasts; the third features the Holy Trinity (center) and the twelve Apostles; and the fourth displays the Theotokos (center) and the twelve Prophets of the Old Testament.

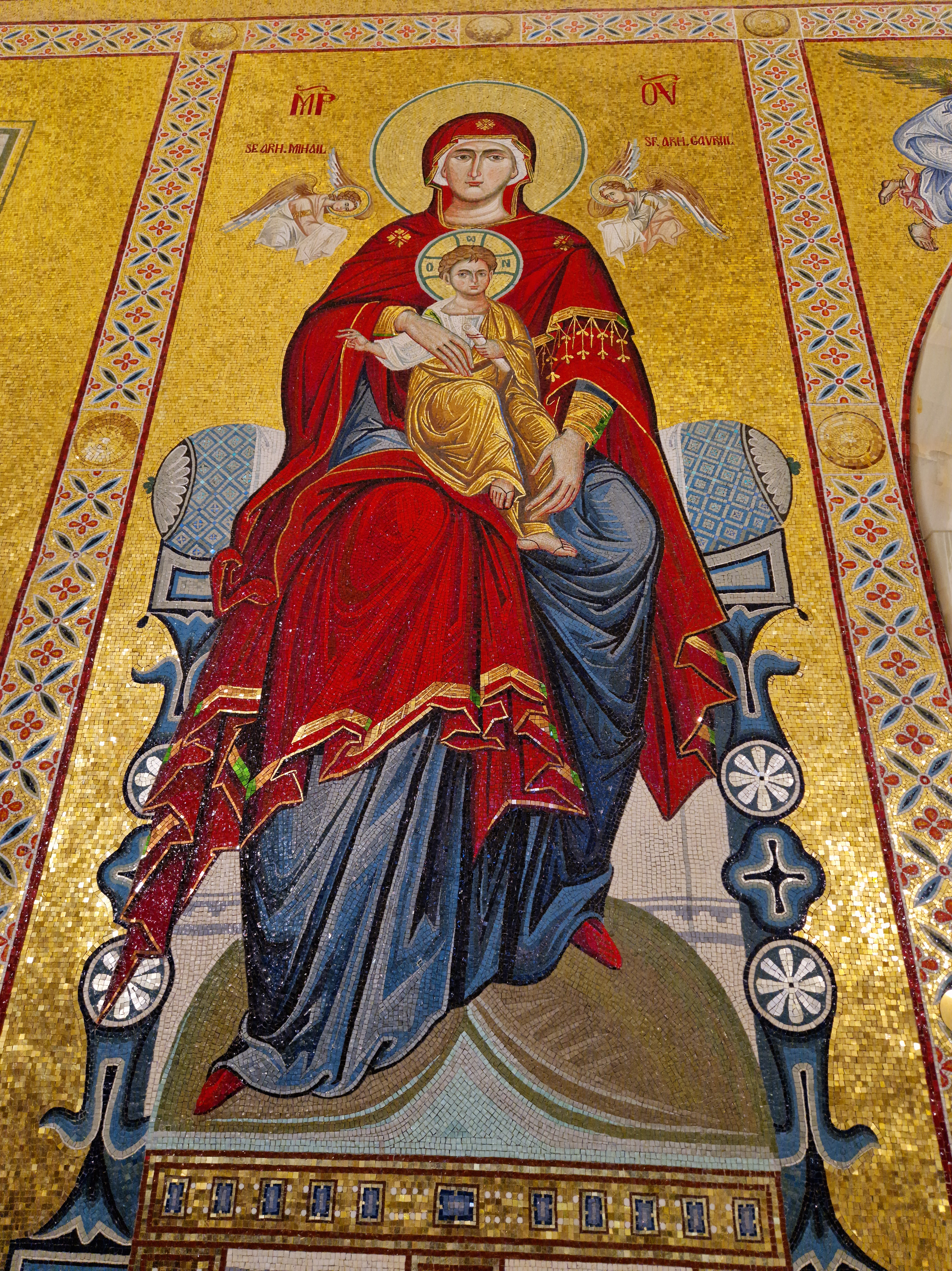
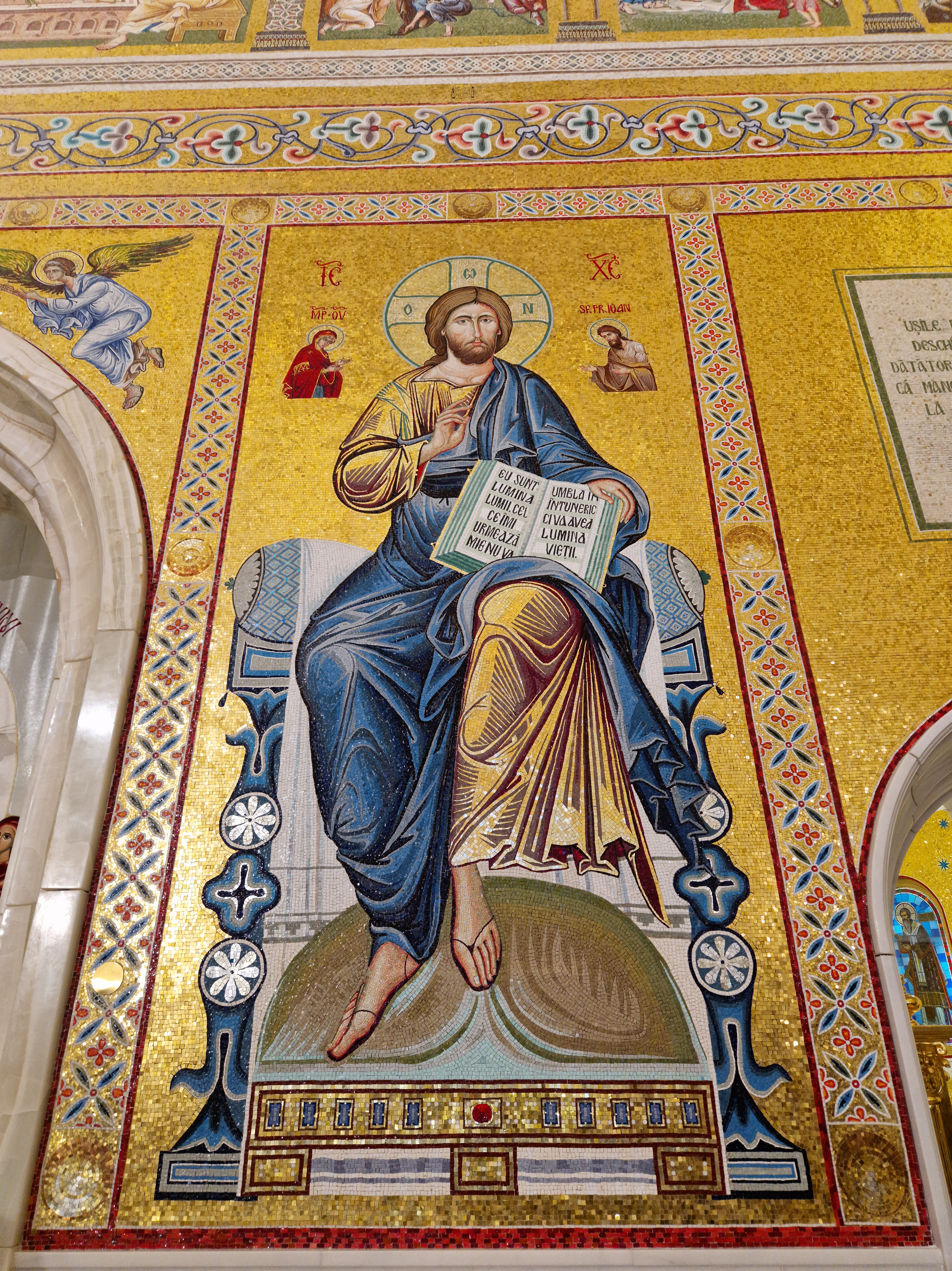

Iconostases typically feature four royal icons, but this one has six, allowing us to represent the two patronal feasts: the Ascension of the Lord and Saint Apostle Andrew. The icons of Saint Nicholas and Saint John the Baptist, two of the most beloved saints in Romanian culture, are placed on the left. Uniquely, the Holy Trinity is represented in the register of the Holy Apostles, occupying the place usually reserved for Christ the Righteous Judge. This latter icon has been moved to the register of the Royal Icon of the Savior Jesus Christ.

The upper register of the iconostasis's rear face centrally features the Last Supper, which serves as a complement to the liturgical representation of the Partaking of the Apostles in the altar hemicycle. On the left, the scene depicts Jesus Christ washing the feet of the disciples. It is a ritual practiced on Holy Thursday (Maundy Thursday). On the right, two scenes are shown: the road to Emmaus appearance and the Supper at Emmaus. The middle and lower registers are dedicated to nineteen Romanian saints. The iconostasis and the altar are joined by two walls, each featuring three saints.

At each entrance to the altar, above the five doors, the following inscriptions are written from right to left: 1st door – the first clause of Revelation 4:1; 2nd door – "Open to me the doors of repentance, O Giver of Life, for my spirit is early astir, pressing toward Your holy temple!" (Horologion); keystone of the central door – "Peace be with you!" (John 20); 4th door – "Open to us the doors of compassion, O blessed Theotokos, for hoping in you, let us not perish!" (Triodion); 5th door – Ezekiel 44:4.

==== Crucifix ====
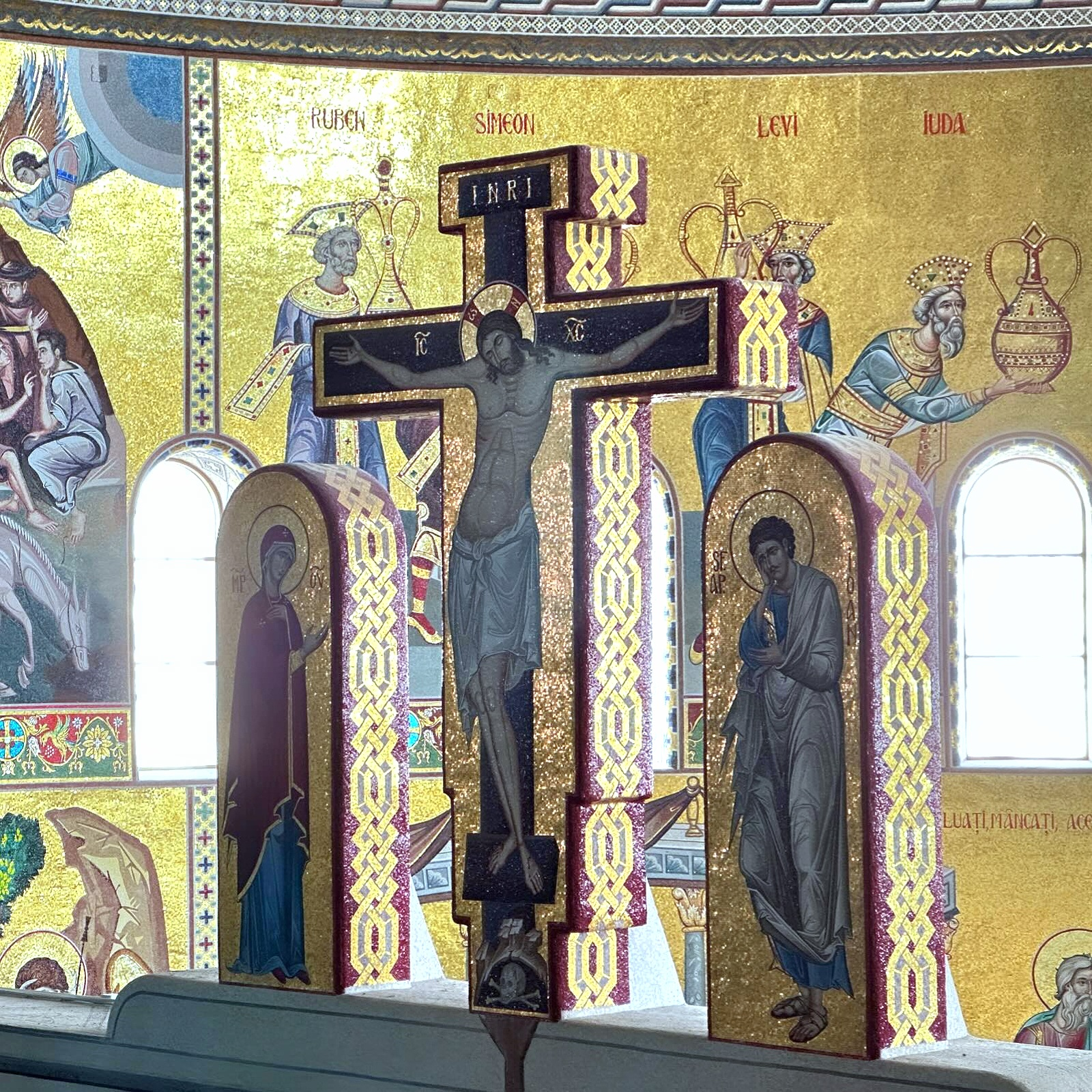

The Crucifix was placed on the iconostasis in December 2021, following the structure's completion in August. The cross and the two attendant mosaics (ro:Molenii) were created between 2018 and 2021 by the iconographer Daniel Codrescu, along with nine other mosaic specialists. The 5-meter-high Crucifix rises 23 meters above the cathedral floor, and it is flanked by the mosaics of the Theotokos and Saint John the Apostle.

On the reverse of the Crucifix is a pelican feeding its chicks, with a quote from the second ode of the Lamentations for the Burial at the bottom: "Like a pelican, You pierced Your side, O Saviour!, You gave Your life for Your sons who died, spreading living springs over them". The image of the mother pelican feeding her chicks with his blood, is rooted in an ancient legend predating Christianity. The pelican symbolizes the Passion of Jesus and the Eucharist in both the East and the West. A copy of this pelican from the back of the Crucifix, can be seen as a circular mosaic imprinted on the nave floor of the Bălăneanu-Iancu Nou Church, Bucharest.

Inscribed on the reverse of the Theotokos mosaic is the passage: "The queen stood at Your right hand, arrayed in a vestment of gold and gloriously adorned" (en-Ps.45:9; gr-Ps.44:11); and on the back of the Saint John the Apostle mosaic is the quote: "Your Own of Your Own, we offer to You on behalf of all and for all" (from the Anaphora Liturgy of the Byzantine Rite). The sides of the cross are decorated with a golden interlace pattern set against a red background. The interlace recalls the archaic motif of the braided rope as a symbol of eternal life. The braiding motif is present at the Romanian monasteries of Curtea de Argeș, Putna or Dragomina. The red color signifies the sacrificial blood of the cross and the royal power of the Lord. Among the sources of inspiration are the crucifixes of Cimabue and Giotto, alongside the crucifix paintings from Saint Catherine's Monastery (12th-century), Studenica Monastery (1208), and St. Mary Peribleptos Church, Ohrid (13th-century).

=== Other notable elements ===
==== Courtyard ====
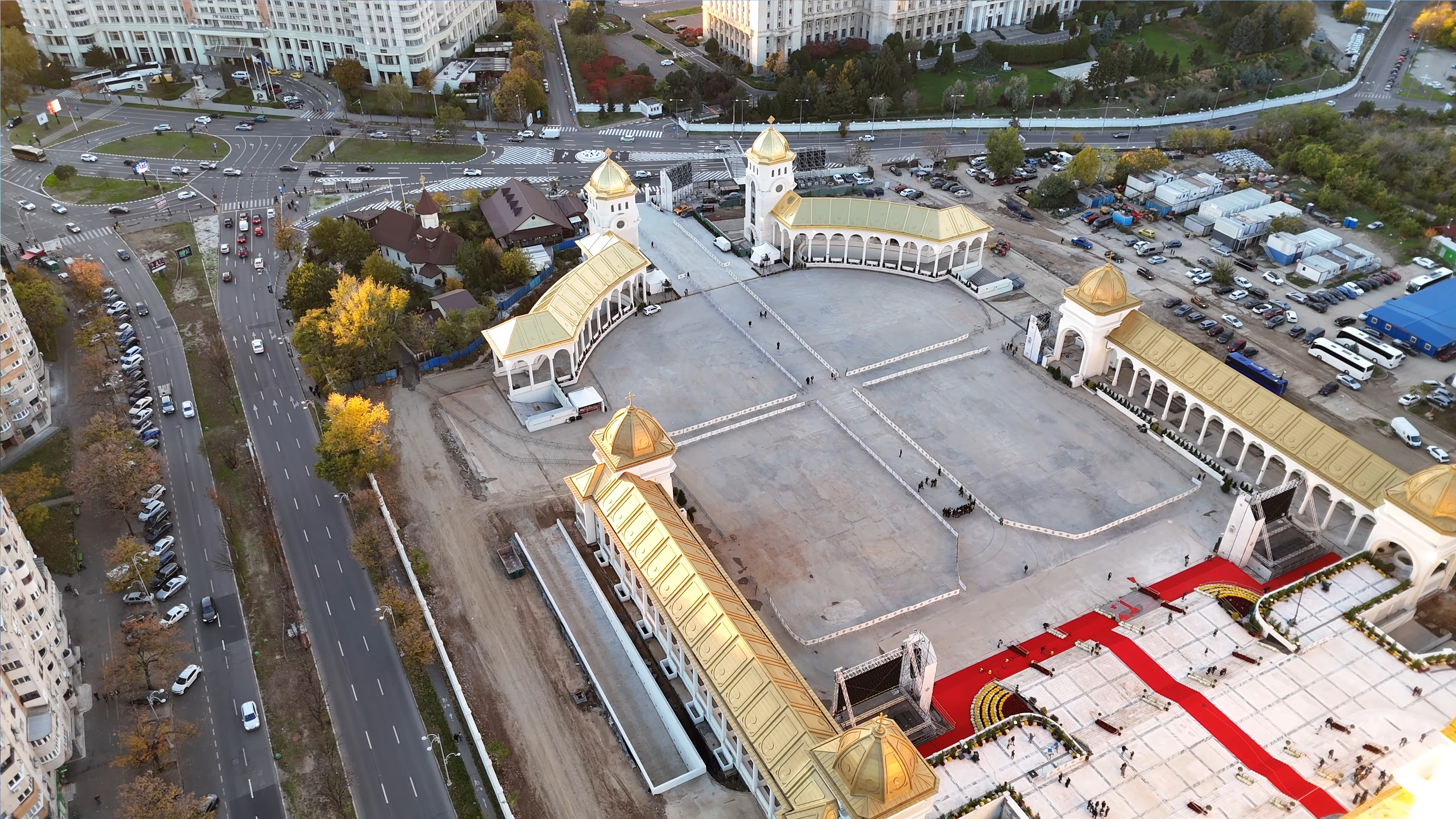
The courtyard and porticos

The cathedral's courtyard features six annexes, and the most important will be St. John's House and St. Paul's House (totaling 3,511 square meters), which provide rooms for clergy pilgrims. These buildings will also house the missionary cultural center, complete with classrooms, seminars, a library, and exhibition spaces. To the west of the cathedral, two curved porticos (totaling 2,080 square meters) mark the main entrance to the ensemble's enclosure, alongside two L-shaped porticos (totaling 5,159 square meters) on either side of the esplanade. Initially, four cultural buildings were planned, but that plan was later abandoned, and the two buildings at the entrance were converted into porticos.

The cathedral's esplanade (piazza) above the St. Andrew's Cave underground gallery, excluding the porticos, has a usable area of 11,600 square meters and can host over 23,000 people. One of the L-shaped porticos includes the cathedral's pangar (souvenir shop), and the other portico houses the place where candles are burned. To the left and behind the cathedral, a five-hectare park will be arranged, featuring a monument dedicated to the Ascension of Christ. Part of the earth excavated from the cathedral's foundation will be used for this monument.

==== Galleries (basement) ====
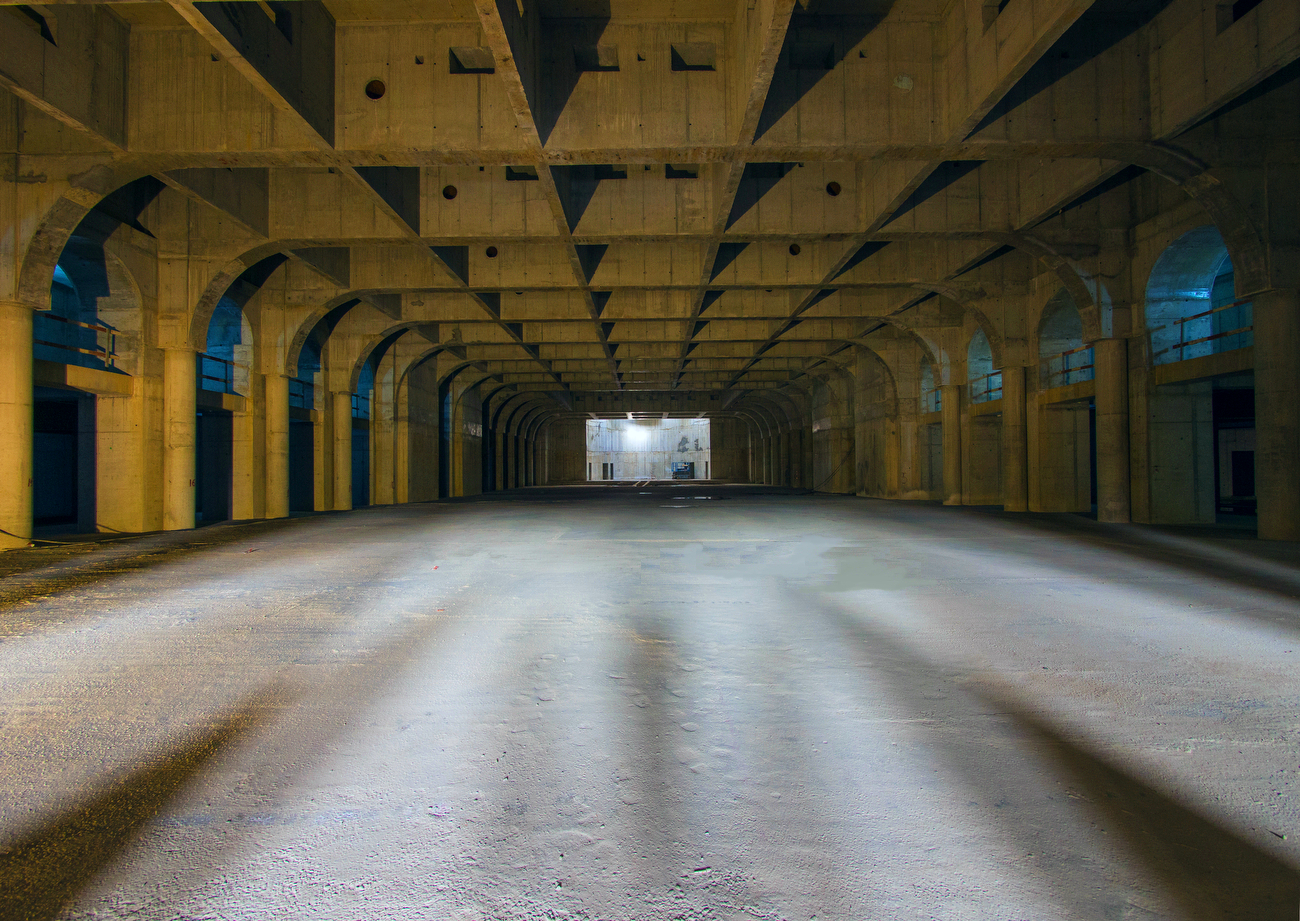
Underground chapel

The underground complex of the People's Salvation Cathedral's galleries covers about 30,000 square meters, extending 330 meters (west to east) by 119 meters (north to south). The cathedral has two large underground galleries, respectively, the cathedral's chapel below, which can accommodate 5,000 pilgrims for the Holy Liturgy, and the polyvalent St. Andrew's Cave gallery below the esplanade, which can accommodate 7,000 pilgrims. The chapel itself has an area of 7,200 square meters, and with its annexes, expands to 13,668 square meters. It is eleven meters high with two levels all around, and has the same horizontal dimensions as the main hall of the cathedral, except that it lacks the two lateral apse spaces. The pilgrims can watch the liturgy even from the upper storey. The St. Andrew's Cave gallery, including its annexes covers 15,581 square meters, and will host the Museum of Romanian Christianity. Under the cathedral chapel, at a depth of 16 meters, only technical spaces for installations will be arranged. Also at this level, 42 crypts will be prepared for the Patriarchs of Romania and four atomic bunkers.

The Holy Altar of the chapel is dedicated to Saint John James the Chozebite and Daniil Sihastrul, because they both lived a part of their lives in a cave. Saint John James the Chozebite lived in the wilderness of Choziba, near Saint George Monastery, toward the end of his life. He was canonized by the Romanian Patriarchate in 1992, and his feast day is on 5 August. Daniil Sihastrul was a renowned Romanian Orthodox spiritual guide, hermit, abbot of Voroneț Monastery, and advisor to Stephen the Great. He encouraged Stephen the Great to fight for the defense of Christendom, and to build holy places after each battle won against invaders. Canonized by the Romanian Patriarchate in 1992, he is commemorated on 18 December.

==== Bells ====
The six bells
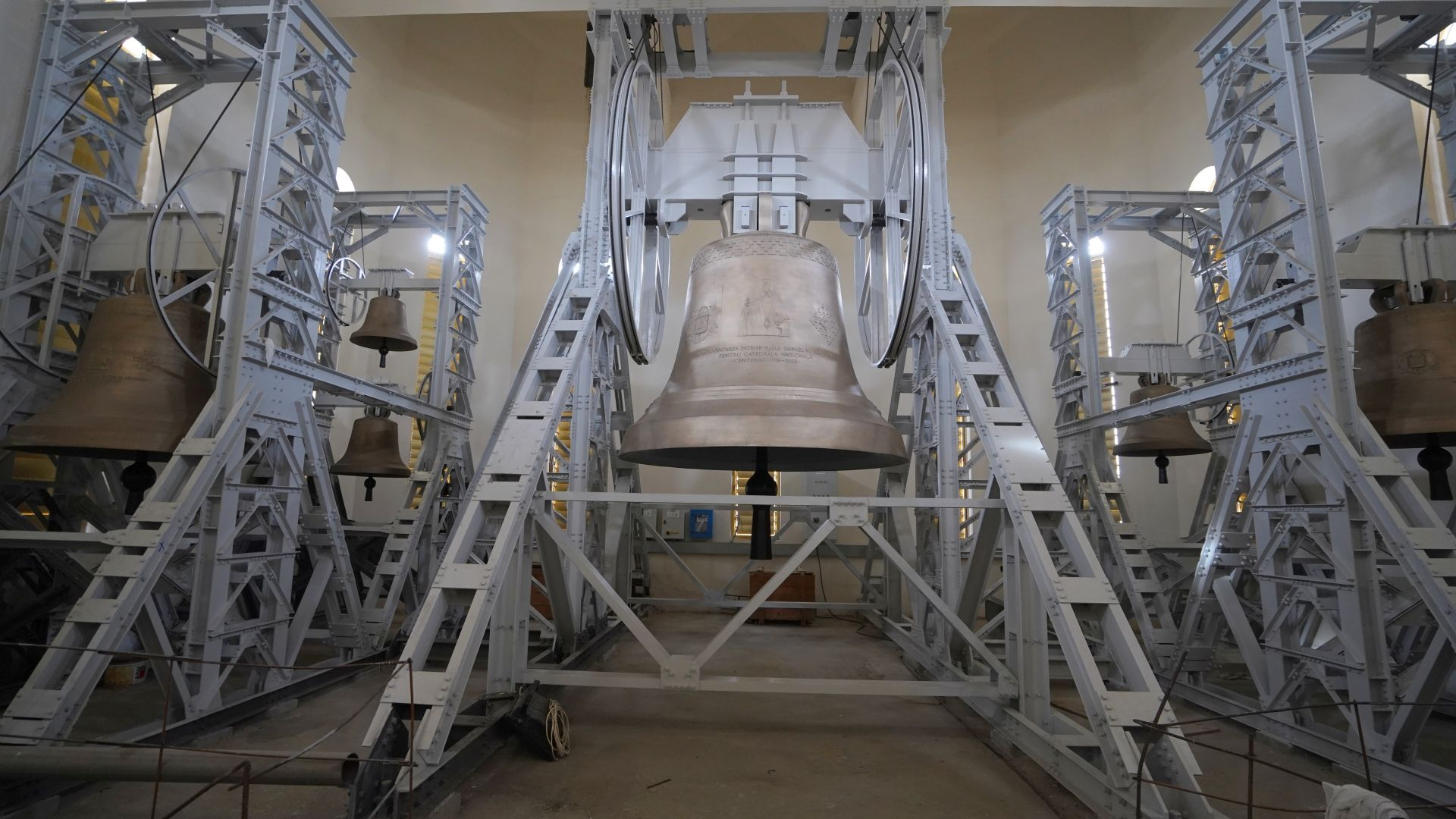

Big Bell 25.2 t (from the bell tower)

Big Bell 25.2 t (from the courtyard)

The cathedral has the world's largest free-swinging church bell, surpassing the Saint Peter's bell (Petersglocke) in the Cologne Cathedral. With a weight of 25,190 kilograms; a clapper of 750 kilograms; a diameter of 3,355 millimeters; a height of 3,130 millimeters; a thickness of 273 millimeters, the bell was cast over a period of 9 minutes and 23 seconds on 11 November 2016, in Innsbruck by Grassmayr, and is elevated in the bell tower at 60 meters. The bell is made of 78% copper and 22% tin (both at 99.99% purity), and has a very low beat: C3 (en) – C0 (de) – Do2 (ro), with 130.8 Hz. The cathedral has six bells weighing a total of 32,243 kilograms, and the sound of the big bell is heard from 15 to 20 kilometers. For the biggest bell 425,000 euros were paid, and the total value of the six bells totalled roughly 550,000 euros.

A team of twenty-five experts from Italy, Germany, Austria, Croatia, and Romania worked on the great bell of the People's Salvation Cathedral. The leader of this team was the Italian campanologist Flavio Zambotto, who said: "The team worked eight months on this bell, and it's made of premium alloys at the highest standards. We worked on the smallest details, and with 99.99% purity, the acoustic tolerance is 0%. I've had the honor of working on several famous bells, every bell is like a son to me, and the bell of the National Cathedral in Bucharest is magnificent, among the best in the world. All the acoustic parameters are superlative, and the sound is sober, very strong, long, and it leaves a mark on you".

The sound of the big bell in the People's Salvation Cathedral in Bucharest was chosen specifically to resemble the sound of the famous Pummerin bell in Saint Stephen's Cathedral in Vienna. However, compared to the Pummerin, the Bucharest bell sounds longer, and is lower and stronger. The big bell is rung only on major holidays and declared national days. The sounds of the six bells span two complete octaves.

Nr.	Diameter (mm)	Mass (kg)	Note			Year cast	Manufacturer
Nr.	Diameter (mm)	Mass (kg)	En	De	Ro	Year cast	Manufacturer
1	3,355	25,190	C3	C^{0}	Do2	2016	Grassmayr Bell Foundry (Innsbruck)
2	1,695	3,296	C4	C^{1}	Do3	2016	Grassmayr Bell Foundry (Innsbruck)
3	1,361	1,685	E4	E^{1}	Mi3	2016	Grassmayr Bell Foundry (Innsbruck)
4	1,127	933	G4	G^{1}	Sol3	2016	Grassmayr Bell Foundry (Innsbruck)
5	1,033	709	A4	A^{1}	La3	2016	Grassmayr Bell Foundry (Innsbruck)
6	875	430	C5	C^{2}	Do4	2016	Grassmayr Bell Foundry (Innsbruck)

== Further details ==
=== Historical events ===
==== Altar consecration ====
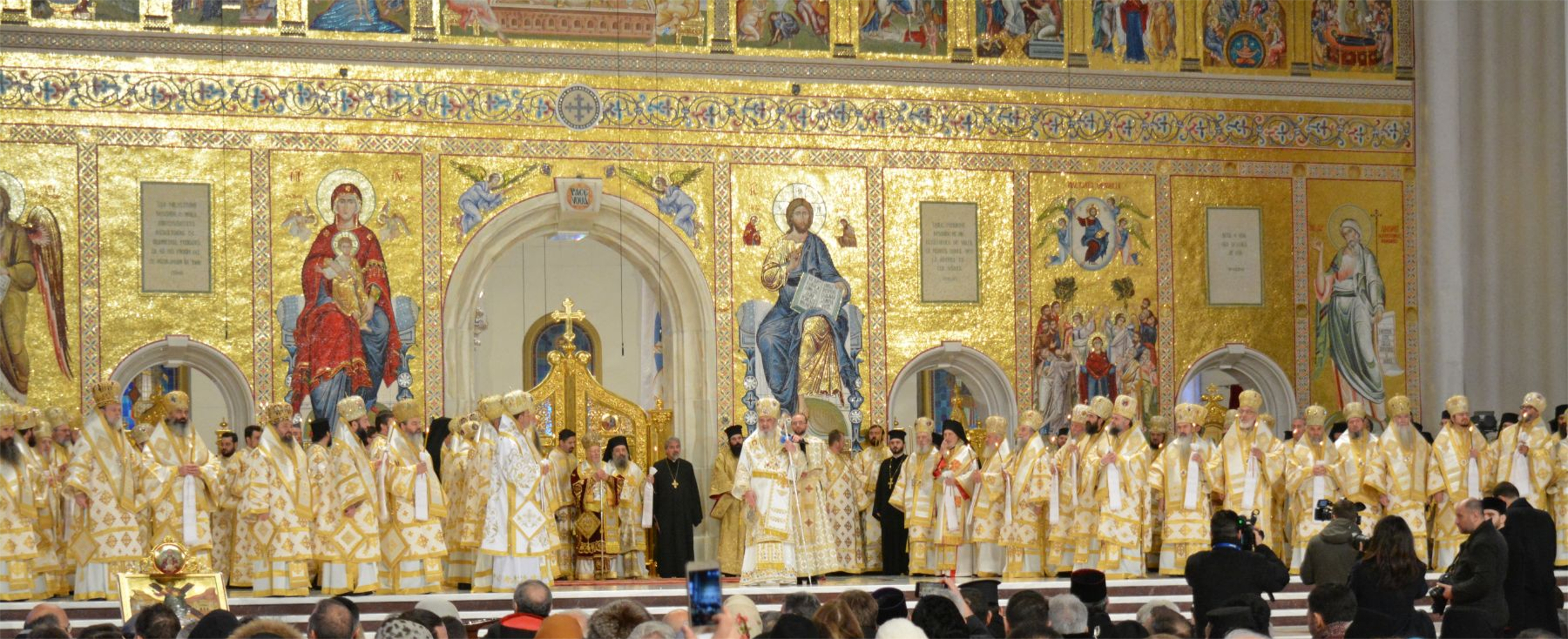
Ecumenical Patriarch Bartholomew I (center-red), Patriarch Daniel of Romania (center) and Metropolitan Chrysostomos of Patras (center-back)

On Sunday, 25 November 2018, the Ecumenical Patriarch Bartholomew I, Patriarch Daniel of Romania, and Metropolitan Chrysostomos of Patras jointly consecrated the People's Salvation Cathedral. The major event was held in the presence of 57 bishops from Romania and other Orthodox countries, together with 43 archimandrites and abbots, to mark the Centenary of Romania. During his homily at the cathedral, Ecumenical Patriarch Bartholomew stated he was "connected" to Patriarch Daniel of Romania through his "old, personal, pure, and sincerely tested friendship, but also with the unshaken, brotherly love in Christ and good understanding".

Thousands of people travelled from all parts of the country to attend the consecration, disregarding the cold weather and long waiting times for a chance to enter the cathedral. Although they had travelled hundreds of kilometers to participate in the consecration of the National Cathedral, the cathedral itself appeared to them as a chimney shrouded in fog. Approximately 55,000 people attended the Divine Liturgy, which took place inside the cathedral immediately after its consecration.

==== Pope Francis ====
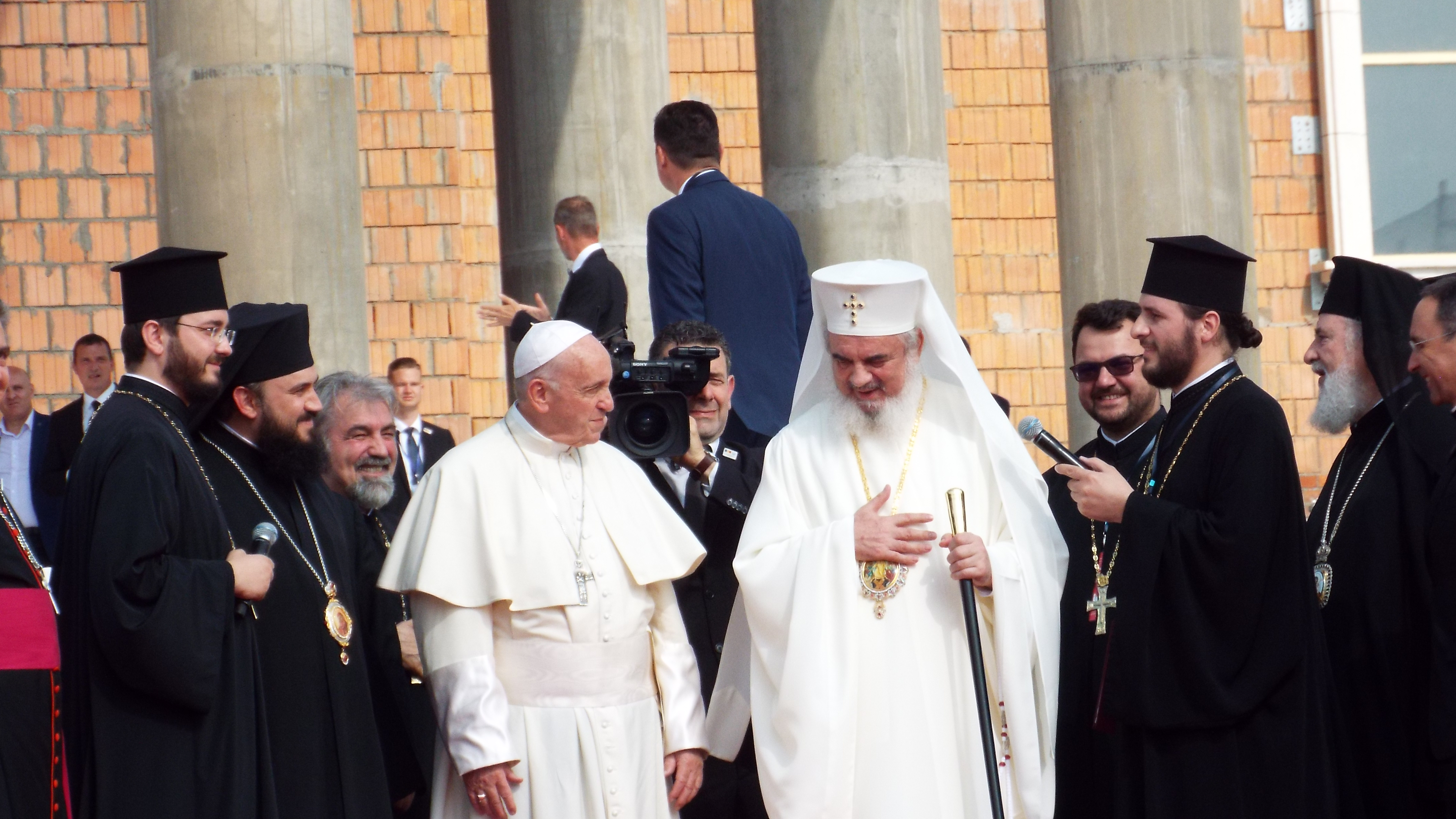
Pope Francis (left, with a zucchetto) and Patriarch Daniel (right, wearing a klobuk)

On 31 May 2019, Pope Francis arrived in Romania, visiting the cathedral the same day. Pope Francis expressed the hope that "Romania can always be a home for all, a place of meeting, a garden in which reconciliation and communion flourish". The Pope emphasized brotherhood and communion among all who prayed to the same Heavenly Father. He said: "Each time we pray, we ask that our trespasses, our debts, be forgiven. This takes courage, for it means that we must forgive the trespasses of others, the debts that others have incurred in our regard. We need to find the strength to forgive our brother or sister from the heart (Mt 18:35), even as you, God, forgive our trespasses: to leave the past behind us, and together, to embrace the present. Help us, God, not to yield to fear, not to see openness as a threat, to find the strength to forgive each other and move on, and the courage not to settle for a quiet life but to keep seeking, with transparency and sincerity, the face of our brothers and sisters... I come as a pilgrim desirous of seeing the Lord's Face in the faces of my brothers".

==== Mosaic consecration ====
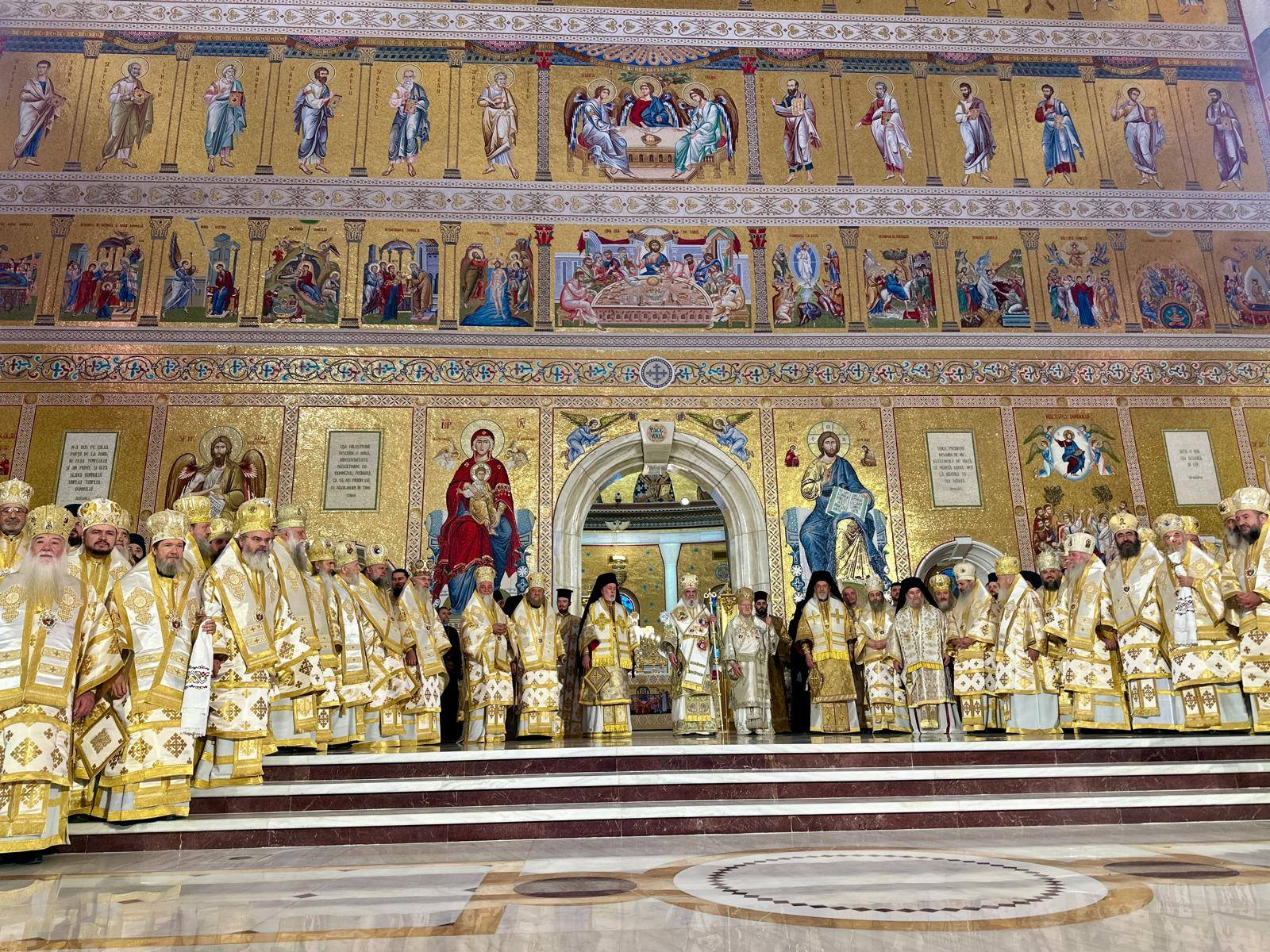
Ecumenical Patriarch Bartholomew I (center-right) Patriarch Daniel of Romania (center)

On Sunday, 26 October 2025, the Ecumenical Patriarch Bartholomew I and Patriarch Daniel of Romania jointly consecrated the People's Salvation Cathedral's mosaic. This major event was held in the presence of 61 bishops who were signatories of the consecration act, together with 67 priests, including 10 monks from Mount Athos, and 12 deacons. The service was held to mark the 140th anniversary of the Autocephaly of the Romanian Orthodox Church, but also the centenary of the Romanian Patriarchate. The act of consecration mentions that about 17,000 square meters of mosaic were completed as of the cathedral's consecration in October 2025. During his homily at the cathedral, Ecumenical Patriarch Bartholomew I stated: "The brotherly invitation of His Beatitude Patriarch Daniel, together with the mutual love and long-standing respect that unite us, have once again brought us from the God-illumined Phanar to the blessed Romanian land and to the God-protected city of Bucharest, bearing with us the blessing and love of our common spiritual Mother — the Great Church of Christ. We have come here to rejoice together in the consecration of the beautiful mosaics and the entire iconography of this magnificent National Cathedral". About 3,000 guests attended the liturgical service inside the cathedral, while 25,000 people gathered outside for the consecration ceremony, even though the mosaic is still unfinished. At the end of the service, some parliamentarians were reportedly booed by the crowd outside.

=== Criticism ===
Critics in the national media often associate the People's Salvation Cathedral and the Palace of the Parliament, the two colossuses of Romania's capital that share the same courtyard. As the largest Orthodox church in the world, positioned next to the world's heaviest and second largest administrative building, the French newspaper Le Figaro named it "a pharaonic project", one "worthy of the megalomania of Nicolae Ceaușescu". One Romanian newspaper stated that the People's Salvation Cathedral will be the most expensive building built in the country after the Romanian Revolution of 1989. Another Romanian newspaper claimed that Romanian government politicians depend on support from the Romanian Patriarchate in their election campaigns, and it estimates that when the cathedral is fully completed, its value on the real estate market will be over €1 billion. A Romanian journalist called the cathedral a "God mall".

The largest construction project in Romania since the revolution, the cathedral was initially announced to be built solely with the Romanian Orthodox Church's own funds. It was later discovered that the Church had used its influence, and the government decided to promulgate Law no. 563/2007, which allows the allocation of unspecified amounts of public funds for the cathedral's construction. Aside from money allocated by the Romanian Government through the State Secretariat for Cults (SSC), local city halls have also contributed to the total budget. The criticism mostly relates to the primary use of state public funds (as opposed to the church's own resources); the lack of proper auctioning processes (reliance on direct acquisitions/selections); the lack of transparency regarding how public funds were spent; erroneous communication, and the chosen construction companies being closely related to church members.

== Cathedral records ==
- is the tallest domed cathedral as well as the tallest non-Gothic style cathedral in the world (133 m total height). It is the 3rd tallest domed church building in the world after Basilica of Our Lady of Peace (158 m) and St. Peter's Basilica (137 m).
- has the world's tallest top dome outside (120 m) (without the lantern and the cross), surpassing Basilica of Our Lady of Peace (118 m) and St. Peter's Basilica (110 m). It also has the world's tallest unpenetrated (without oculus) dome inside (106 m).
- is the largest by volume (323,000 m^{3}) and area (6,000 m^{2}), the tallest (133 m), longest (126 m) and heaviest (425,000 tons) Eastern Orthodox Church building in the world. It is also one of the largest of all church buildings in the world.
- has the world's largest iconostasis (407 m^{2}), and the world's largest free-swinging church bell (25.2 tons).
- will have the largest mosaic collection (interior decoration) in the world when it is completed (25,000 m^{2}).
- has the tallest (44 m inside), widest (25.7 m inside) and longest (78.3 m inside) Eastern Orthodox church nave in the world. It is the 2nd widest and 8th tallest among all naves in the world (only 1.3 meters lower than the nave of St. Peter's Basilica).

== See also ==
- List of largest Eastern Orthodox church buildings
- List of largest church buildings
- List of tallest church buildings
- List of tallest domes
- List of highest church naves

=== Romania ===
- Romanian Orthodox Church
- Religion in Romania
- History of Christianity in Romania
