= Bell =

Percussion instrument

- Parts of a typical tower bell hung for swinging: 1. Bell yoke or headstock, 2. canons, 3. crown, 4. shoulder, 5. waist, 6. sound bow, 7. lip, 8. mouth, 9. clapper, 10. bead line

Percussion instrument
- Classification: Struck idiophone
- Hornbostel–Sachs classification: 111.242 (Bells: Percussion vessels with the vibration weakest near the vertex)

Playing range
- From very high to very low

Related instruments
- Chimes, cowbell, handbell, gong

A bell /ˈbɛl/ is a directly struck idiophone percussion instrument. Most bells have the shape of a hollow cup that—when struck—vibrates in a single strong strike tone, with its sides forming an efficient resonator. The strike may be made by an internal "clapper" or "uvula", an external hammer, or—in small bells—by a small loose sphere enclosed within the body of the bell (jingle bell).

Bells are usually cast from bell metal (a type of bronze) for its resonant properties, but can also be made from other hard materials. This depends on the function. Some small bells (such as ornamental bells or cowbells) can be made from cast or pressed metal, glass or ceramic, but large bells (such as a church, clock, and tower bells) are normally cast from bell metal.

Bells intended to be heard over a wide area can range from a single bell hung in a turret or bell-gable, to a musical ensemble such as an English ring of bells, a carillon or a Russian zvon which are tuned to a common scale and installed in a bell tower. Many public or institutional buildings house bells, most commonly as clock bells to sound the hours and quarters.

Historically, bells have been associated with religious rites, and are still used to call communities together for religious services. Later, bells were made to commemorate important events or people and have been associated with the concepts of peace and freedom. The study of bells is called campanology.

== Etymology ==
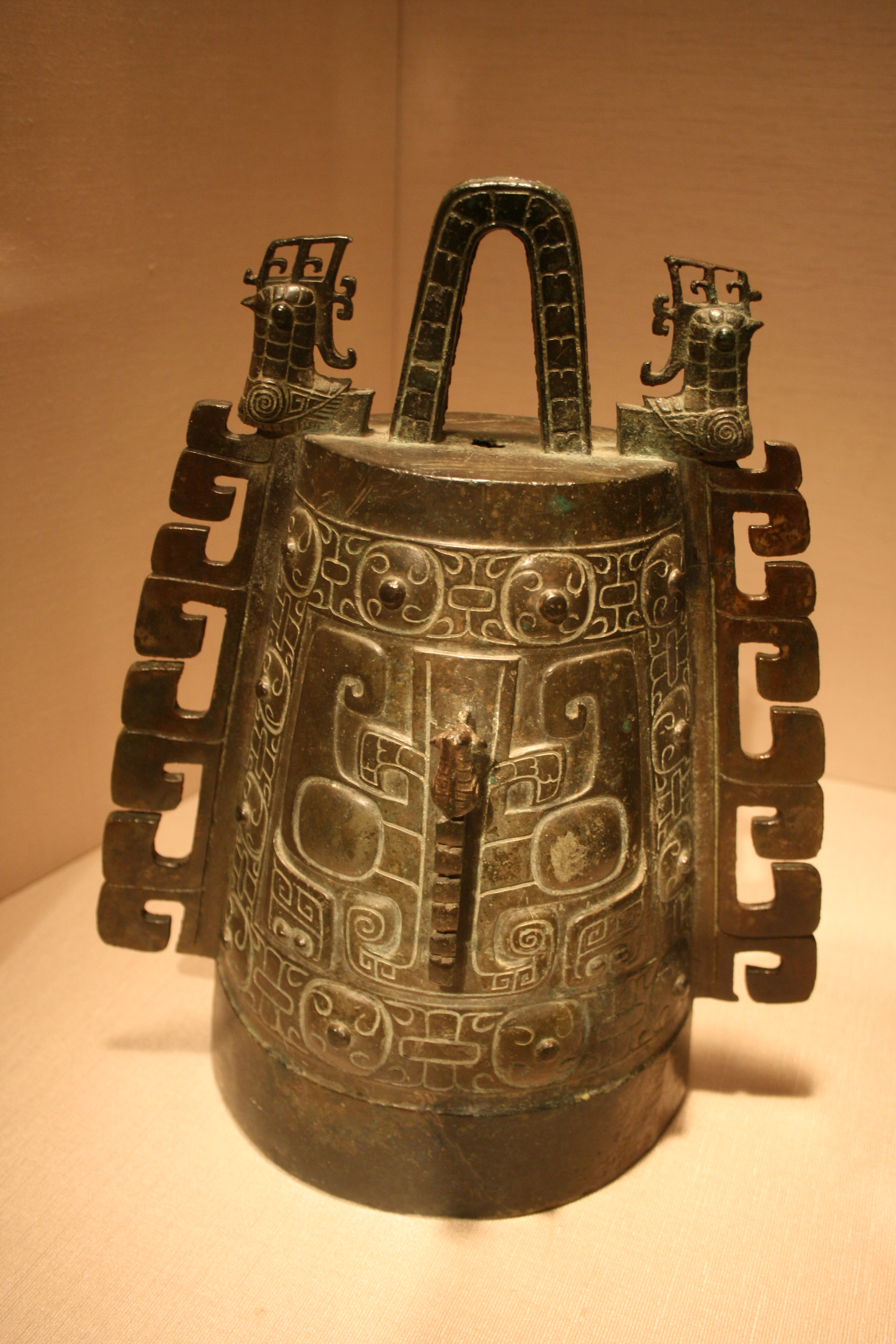
13th c. BC bell, Shang dynasty

Bell is a word common to the Low German dialects, cognate with Middle Low German belle and Dutch bel but not appearing among the other Germanic languages except the Icelandic bjalla which was a loanword from Old English. It is popularly but not certainly related to the former sense of to bell (Old English: bellan, 'to roar, to make a loud noise') which gave rise to bellow.

== History ==
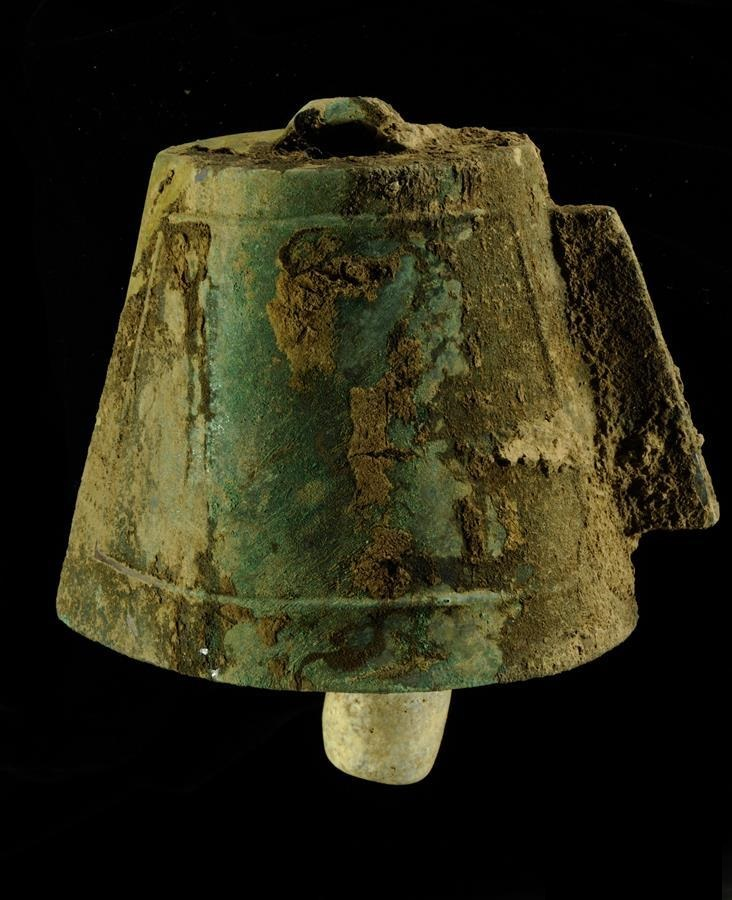
Chinese bronze bell, 18th–16th century BCE

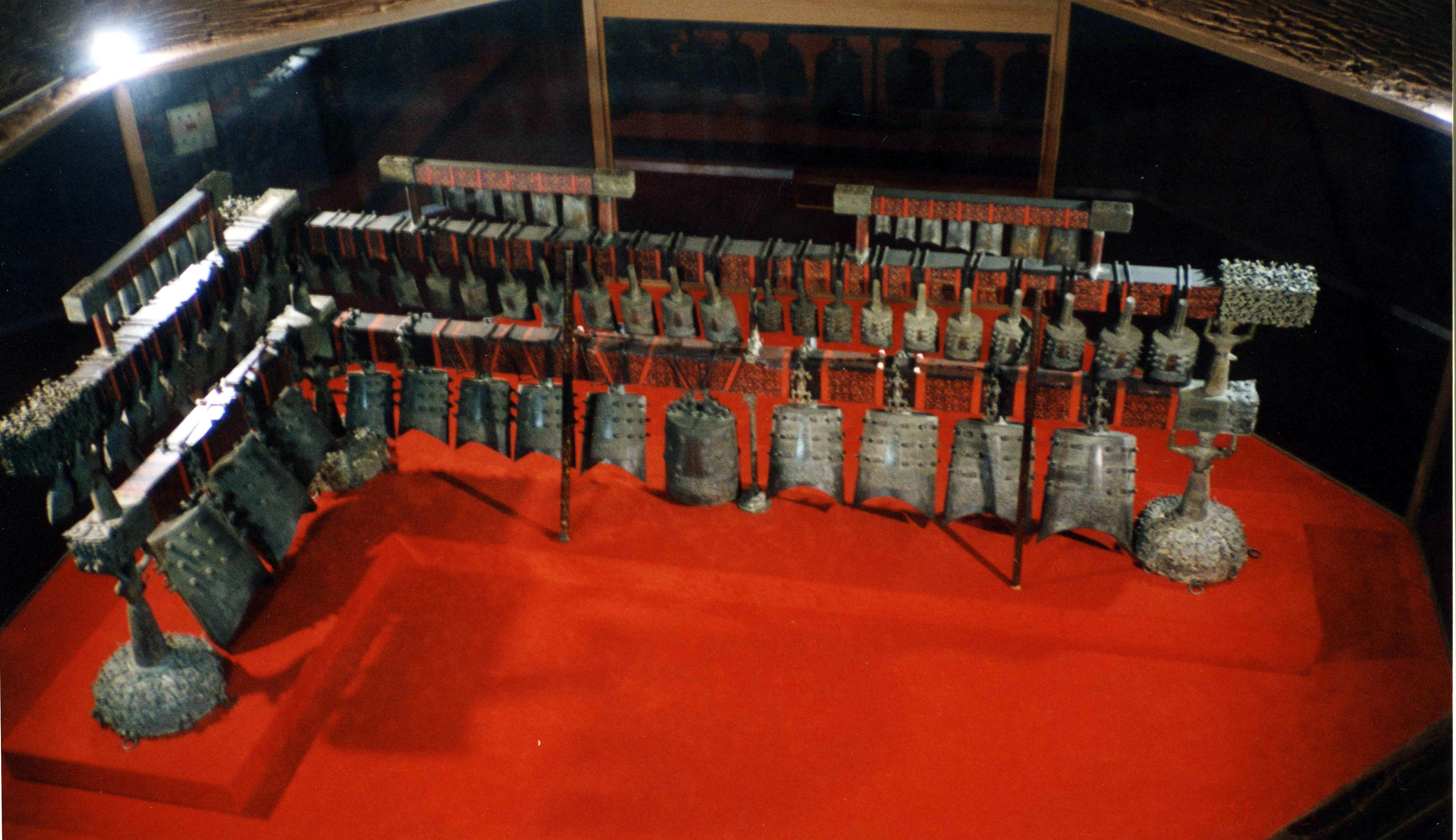
Bianzhong of Marquis Yi of Zeng, dated 433 BCE

The earliest archaeological evidence of bells dates from the 3rd millennium BCE, and is traced to the Yangshao culture of Neolithic China. Clapper-bells made of pottery have been found in several archaeological sites. The pottery bells later developed into metal bells. In West Asia, the first bells appear in 1000 BCE. The earliest metal bells, with one found in the Taosi site and four in the Erlitou site, are dated to about 2000 BCE. With the emergence of other kinds of bells during the Shang dynasty (c. 1600 – c. 1050 BCE), they were relegated to subservient functions; at Shang and Zhou sites, they are also found as part of the horse-and-chariot gear and as collar-bells of dogs. By the 13th century BCE, bells weighing over 150 kilograms (330 pounds) were being cast in China. After 1000 CE, iron became the most commonly used metal for bells instead of bronze. The earliest dated iron bell was manufactured in 1079, found in Hubei Province.

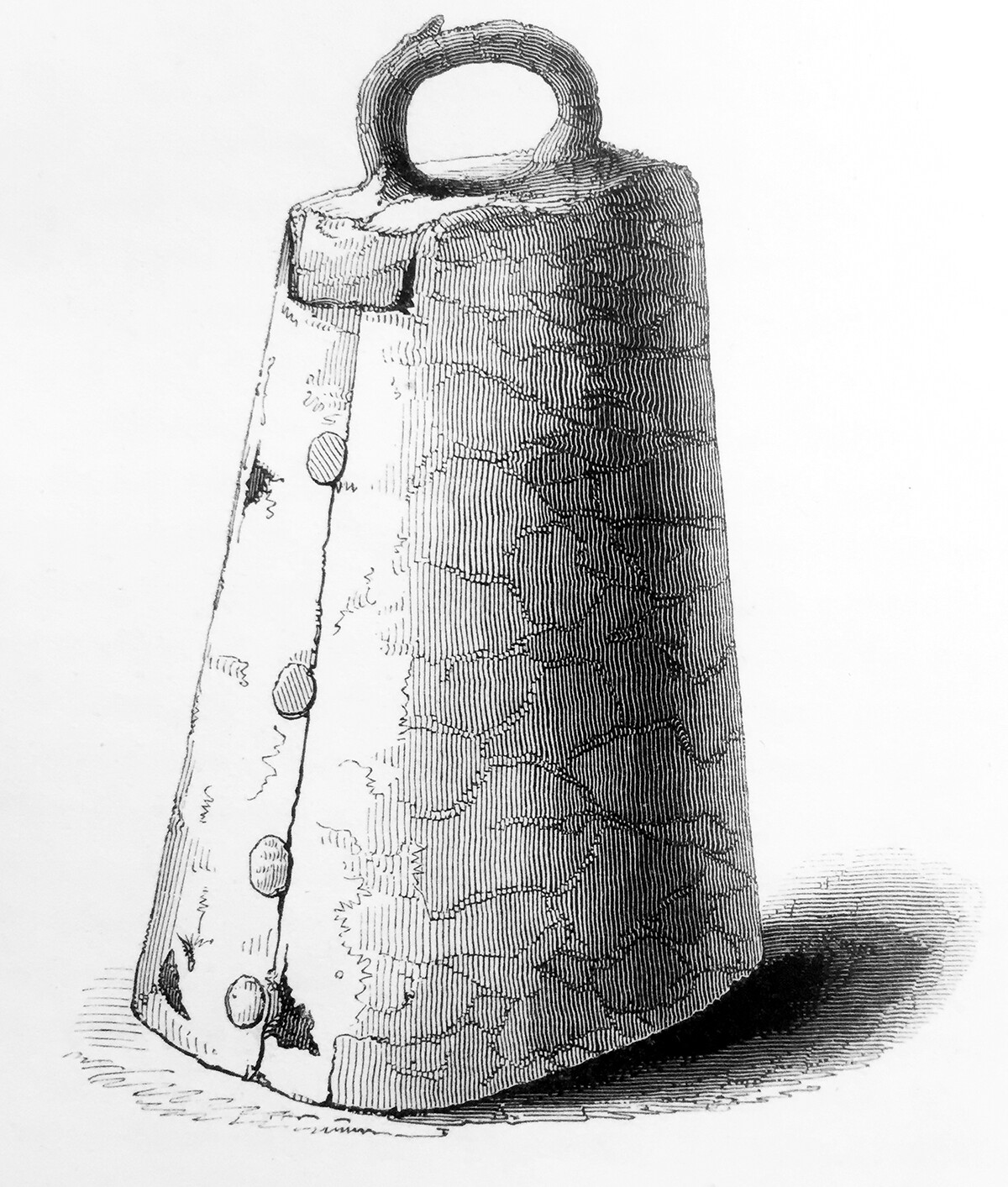
Early medieval folded-iron and brazed handbell from Britain

Bells west of China did not reach the same size until the 2nd millennium CE. Assyrian bells dated to the 7th century BCE were around 4 inches high. Roman bells dated to the 1st and 2nd century CE were around 8 inches high. The book of Exodus in the Bible notes that small gold bells were worn as ornaments on the hem of the robe of the high priest in Jerusalem. Among the ancient Greeks, handbells were used in camps and garrisons and by patrols that went around to visit sentinels. Among the Romans, the hour of bathing was announced by a bell. They also used them in the home, as an ornament and emblem, and bells were placed around the necks of cattle and sheep so they could be found if they strayed.

In the fifth-century Celtic Church of Britain, small handbells were made from sheet iron, first folded and riveted, and then brazed with molten copper. As late as the 10th century CE, European bells were no higher than 2 feet in height.

== Styles of ringing ==
Static bells struck by solenoid-operated hammers in a bell-gable

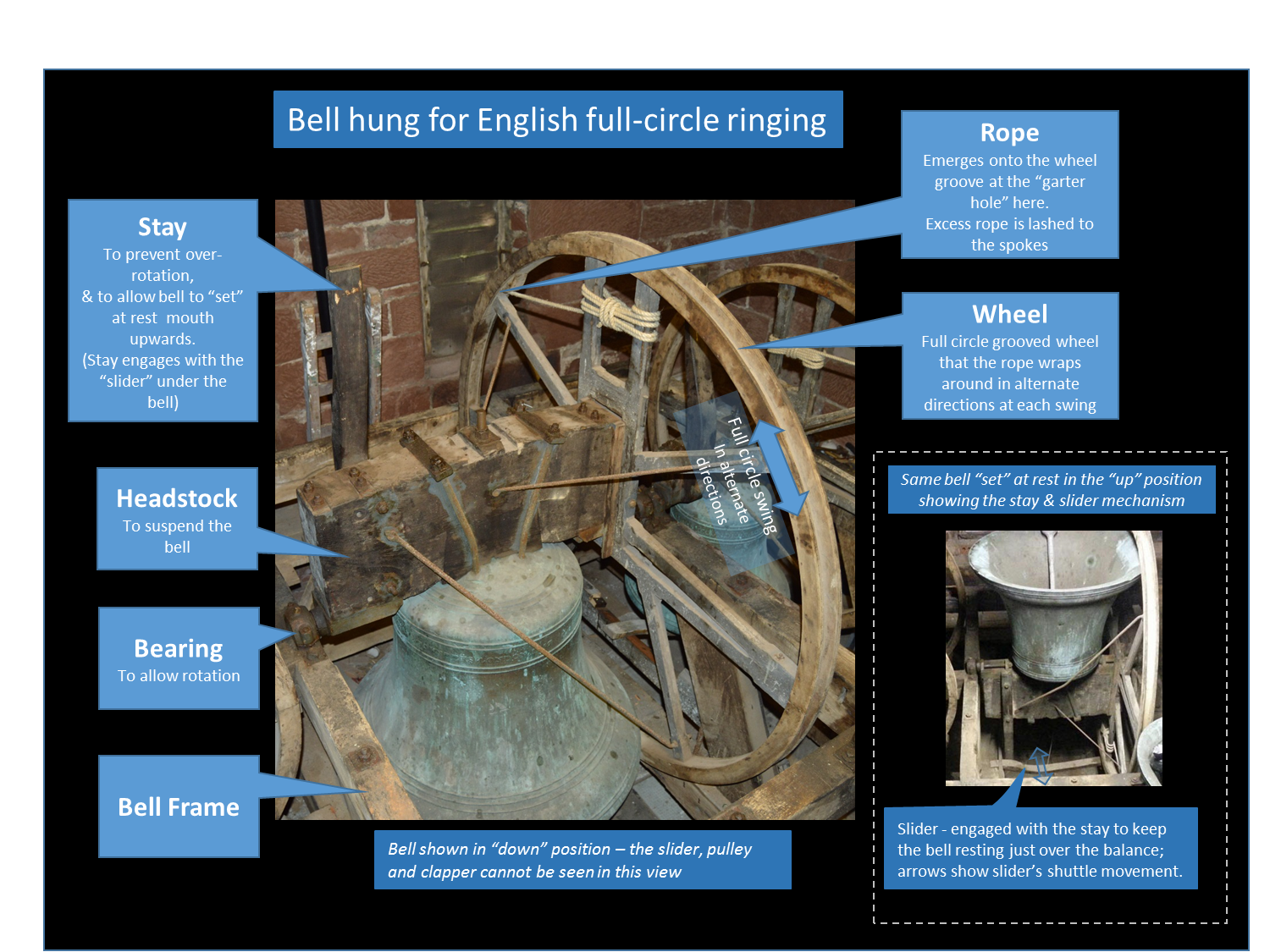
Mechanism of a bell hung for English full-circle ringing. The bell can swing through a full circle in alternate directions.

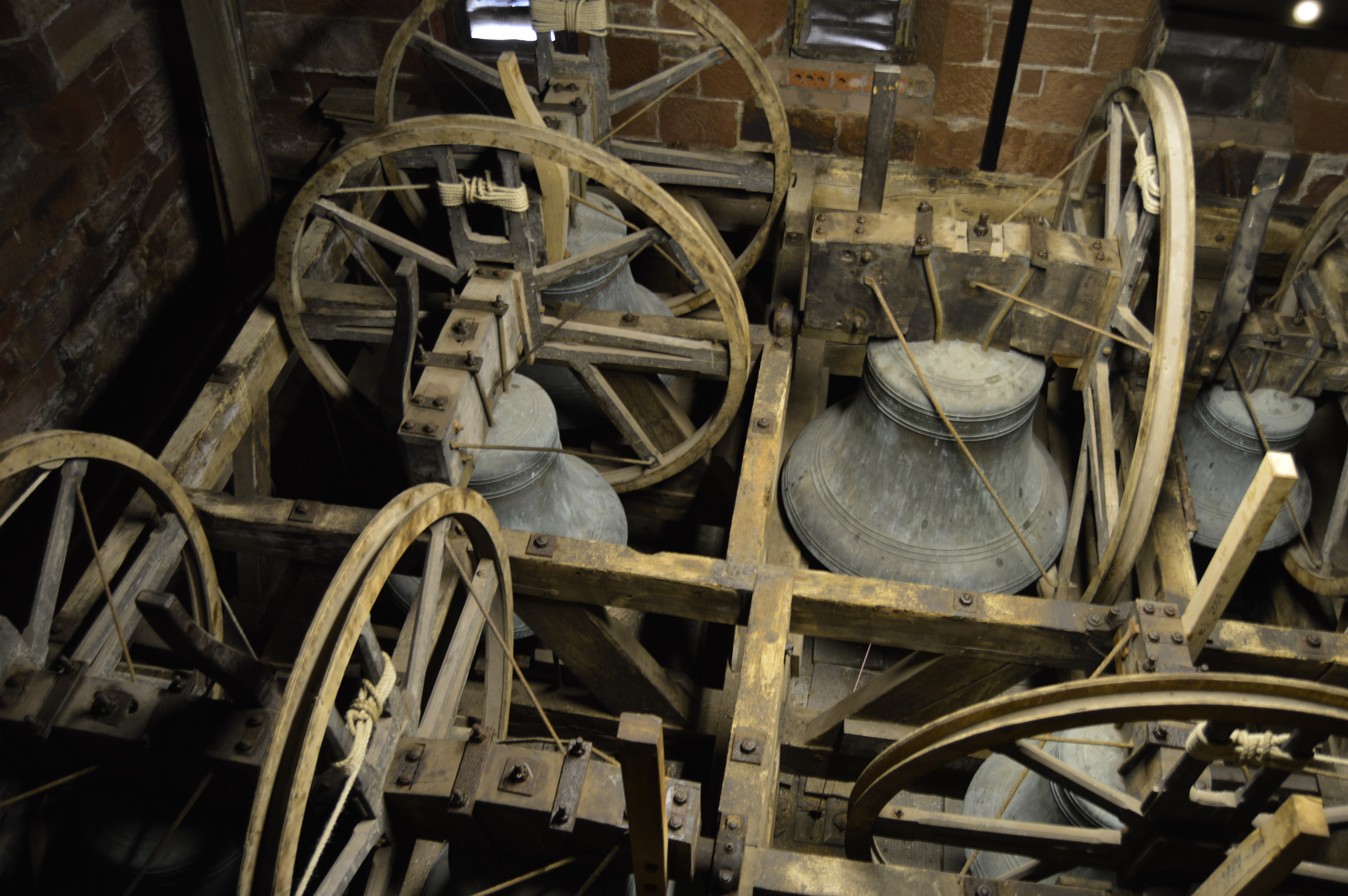
English full-circle bells shown in the "down" position, in which they are normally left between ringing sessions

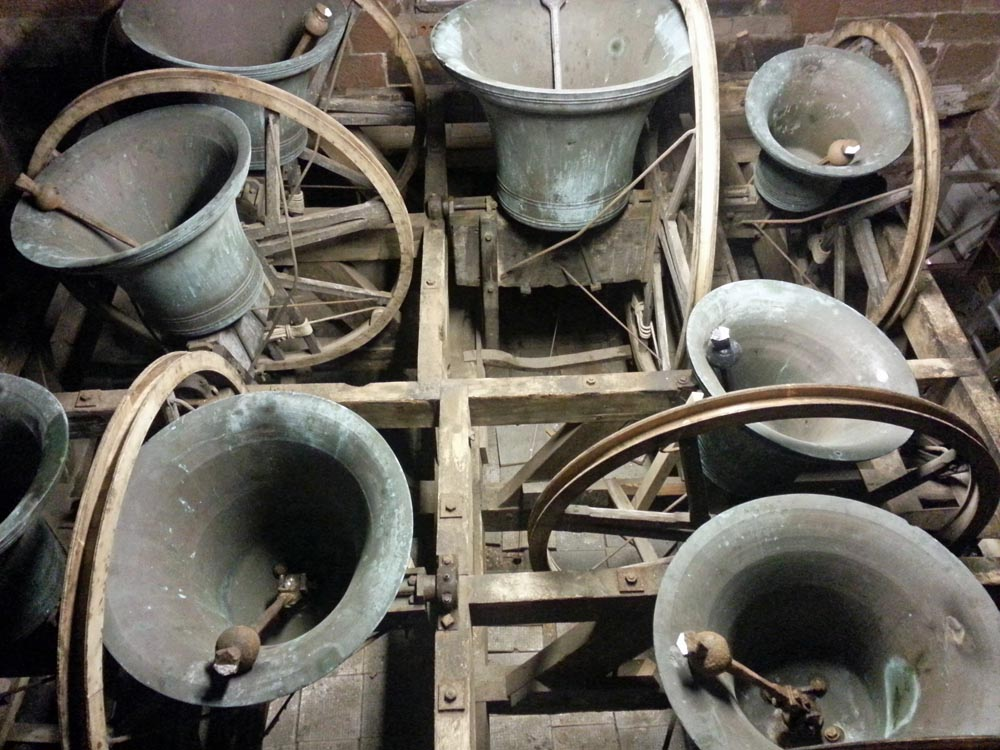
English full-circle bells shown in the "up" position

In the western world, the common form of bell is a church bell or town bell, which is hung within a tower or bell cote. Such bells are either fixed in a static position ("hung dead") or mounted on a beam (the "headstock") so they can swing to and fro. Bells that are hung dead are normally sounded by hitting the sound bow with a hammer or occasionally by pulling an internal clapper against the bell.

A bell can be swung in a small arc with a rope and lever or higher with a rope and wheel. As it swings higher, the sound projects outward instead of downward. Larger bells may be swung using electric motors. In some places, such as the Salzburg Cathedral, the clapper is held against the sound bow with an electric clasp as the bell swings up. The clasp would release the clapper to provide a cleaner start to ringing. To silence the bell, the clasp catches and locks the clapper back in place.

Bells hung for full circle ringing are swung through just over a complete circle from mouth uppermost. A stay (the wooden pole seen sticking up when the bells are down) engages a mechanism to allow the bell to rest just past its balance point. The rope is attached to one side of a wheel so that a different amount of rope is wound on and off as it swings to and fro. The bells are controlled by ringers (one to a bell) in a chamber below, who rotate the bell through a full circle and back, and control the speed of oscillation when the bell is mouth upwards at the balance-point when little effort is required.

Swinging bells are sounded by an internal clapper. The clapper may have a longer period of swing than the bell. In this case, the bell will catch up with the clapper and if rung to or near full circle will carry the clapper up on the bell's trailing side. Alternatively, the clapper may have a shorter period and catch up with the bell's leading side, travel up with the bell, and come to rest on the downhill side. This latter method is used in English style full circle ringing.

Occasionally the clappers have leather pads (called muffles) strapped around them to quieten the bells when practice ringing to avoid annoying the neighbourhood. Also at funerals, half-muffles are often used to give a full open sound on one round, and a muffled sound on the alternate round for a distinctive, mournful effect. This was done at the Funeral of Diana, Princess of Wales in 1997.

A carillon, which is a musical instrument consisting of at least 23 cast bronze cup-shaped bells, is tuned so that the bells can be played serially to produce a melody, or sounded together to play a chord. A traditional carillon is played by striking a baton keyboard with the fists, and by pressing the keys of a pedal keyboard with the feet. The keys mechanically activate levers and wires that connect to metal clappers that strike the inside of the bells, allowing the performer to vary the intensity of the note according to the force applied to the key.

== Church and temple bells ==
In the Eastern world, the traditional forms of bells are temple and palace bells, small ones being rung by a sharp rap with a stick, and very large ones rung by a blow from the outside by a large swinging beam. (See images of the great bell of Mii-dera below.)

The striking technique is employed worldwide for some of the largest tower-borne bells because swinging the bells themselves could damage their towers.

In the Roman Catholic Church and among some High Lutherans and Anglicans, small hand-held bells, called Sanctus or sacring bells, are often rung by a server at Mass when the priest holds high up first the host and then the chalice immediately after he has said the words of consecration over them (the moment known as the Elevation). This serves to indicate to the congregation that the bread and wine have just been transformed into the Body and Blood of Christ (see transubstantiation), or, in the alternative Reformation teaching, that Christ is now bodily present in the elements, and that what the priest is holding up for them to look at is Christ himself (see consubstantiation).

In Russian Orthodox bell ringing, the entire bell never moves, only the clapper. A complex system of ropes is developed and used uniquely for every bell tower. Some ropes (the smaller ones) are played by hand, the bigger ropes are played by foot.

=== Bells in Japanese religion ===
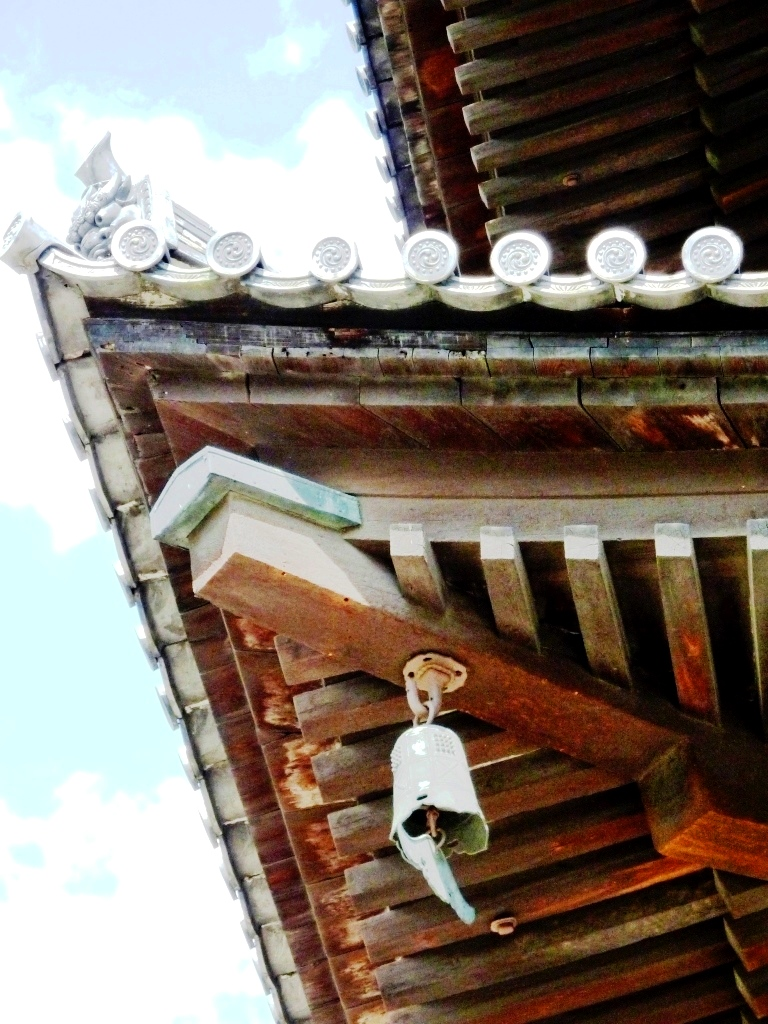
Wind-powered bell under temple eaves, Banna-ji; Ashikaga, Tochigi

Japanese Shintoist and Buddhist bells are used in religious ceremonies. Suzui, a homophone meaning both "cool" and "refreshing", are spherical bells which contain metal pellets that produce sound from the inside. The hemispherical bell is the Kane bell, which is struck on the outside. Large suspended temple bells are known as bonshō. (See also ja:鈴, ja:梵鐘).

=== Bells in Jainism, Buddhism and Hinduism ===
Jain, Hindu and Buddhist bells, called "Ghanta" (IAST: Ghaṇṭā) in Sanskrit, are used in religious ceremonies. See also singing bowls. A bell hangs at the gate of many Hindu temples and is rung at the moment one enters the temple.

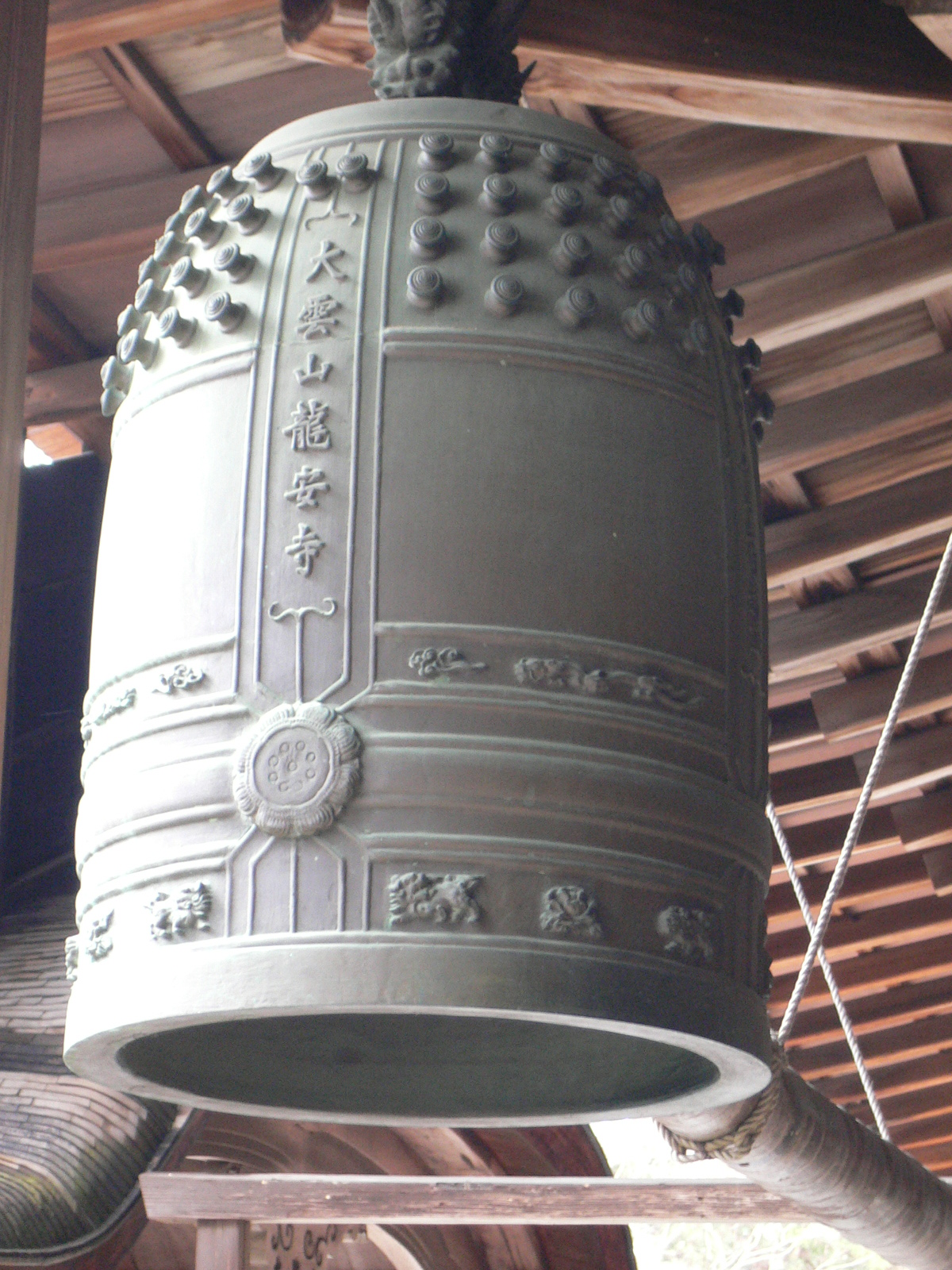
Japanese temple bell of the Ryōanji Temple, Kyoto

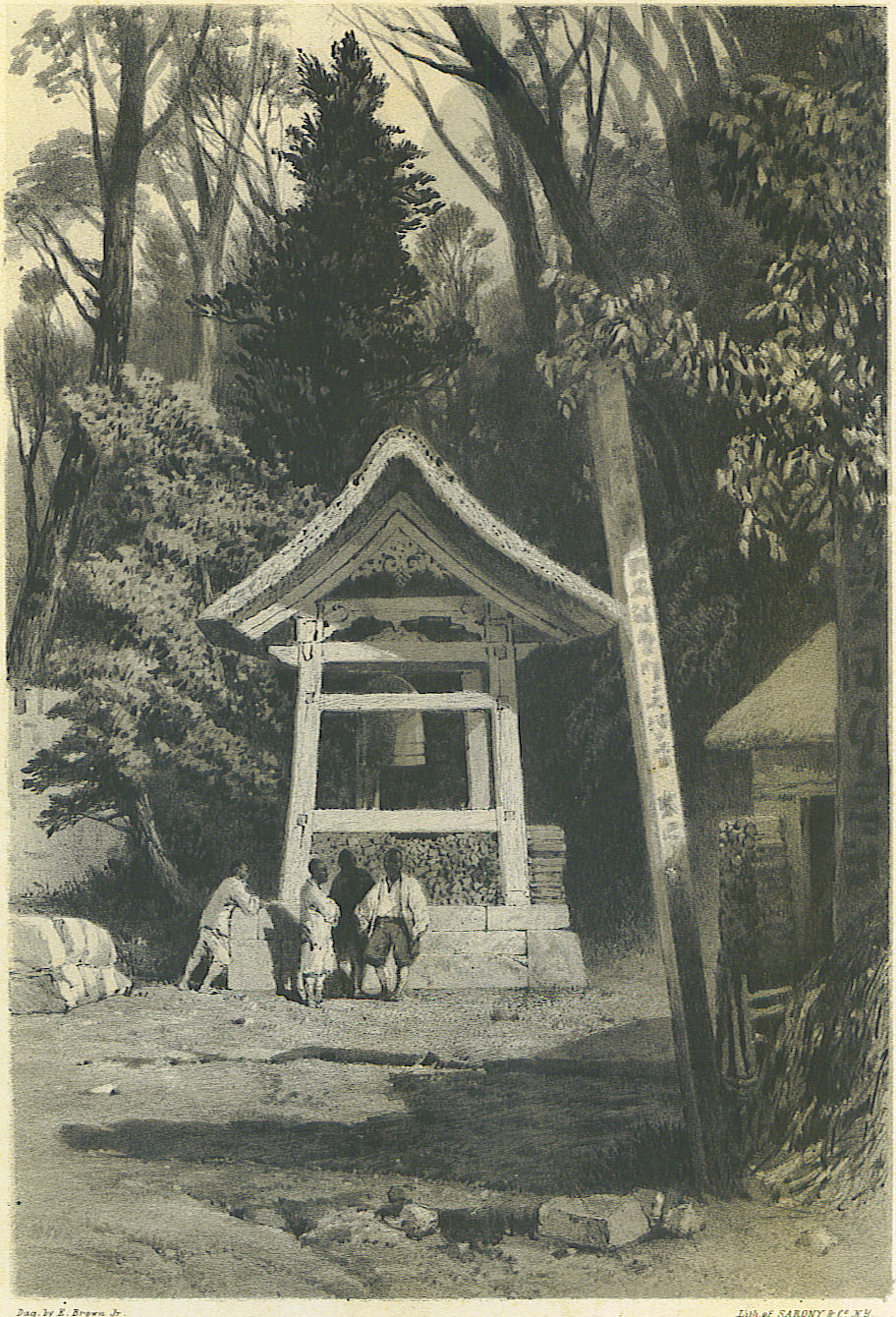
"Bell house at Shimoda" in Japan

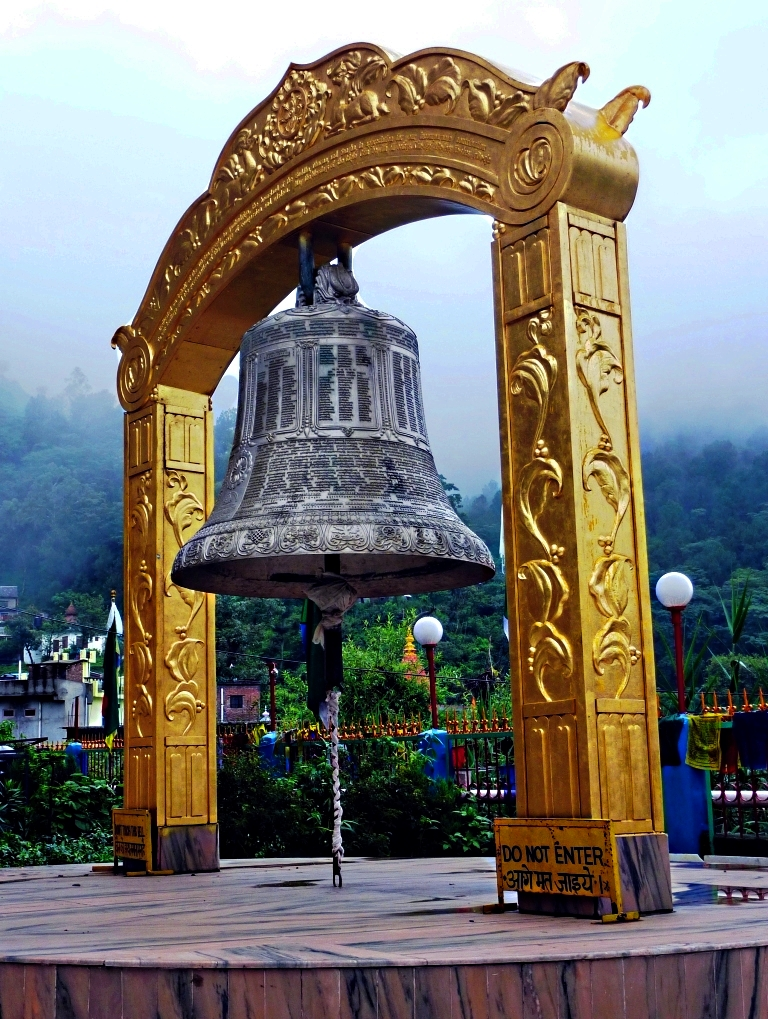
Buddhist bell, Rewalsar, India

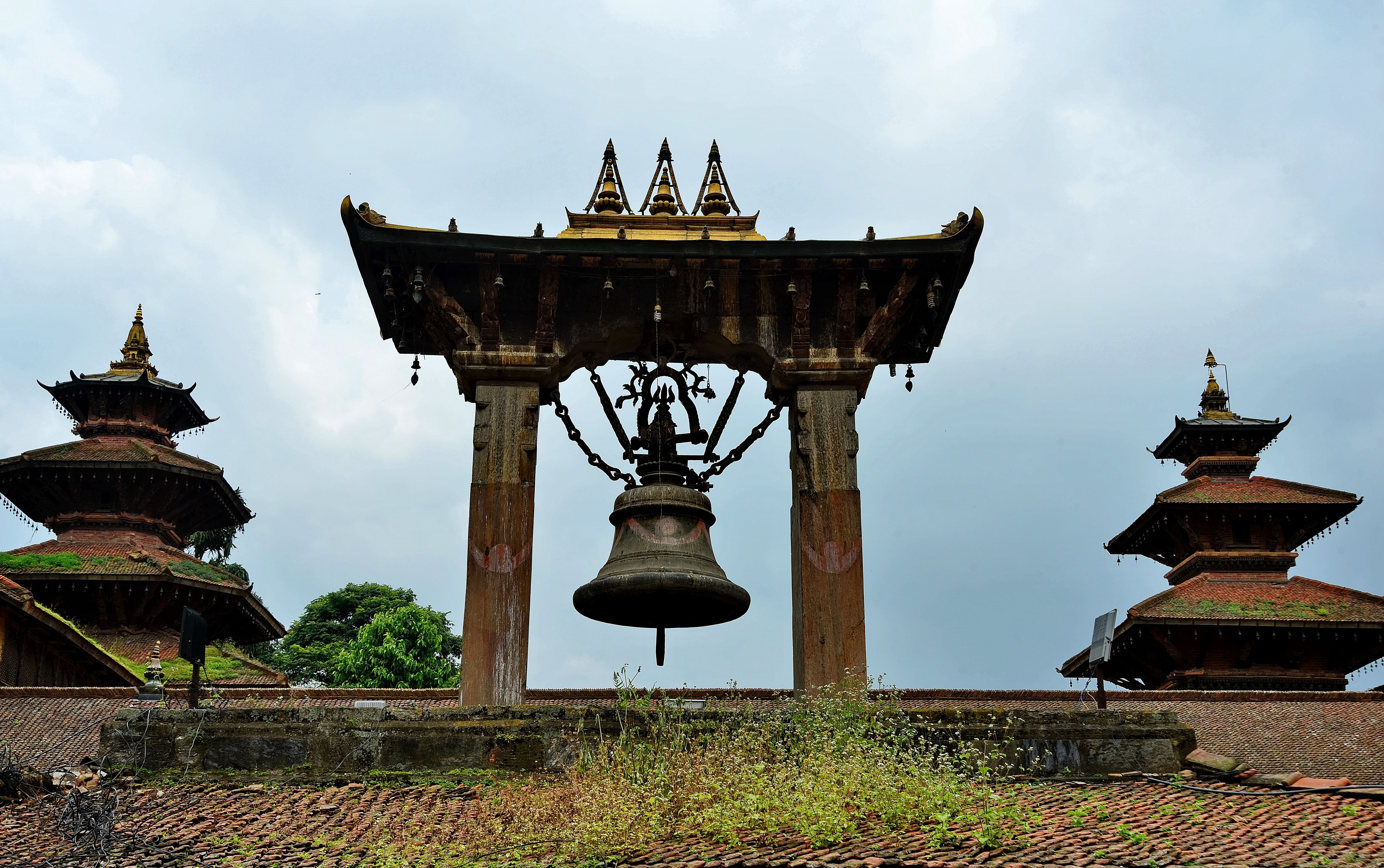
Bell of Taleju Bhawani temple (Patan Durbar Square, Nepal

== Bellfounding ==
The process of casting bells is called bellfounding, and in Europe dates to the 4th or 5th century. The traditional metal for these bells is a bronze of about 23% tin. Known as bell metal, this alloy is also the traditional alloy for the finest Turkish and Chinese cymbals. Other materials sometimes used for large bells include brass and iron. Steel was tried during the busy church-building period of mid-19th-century England, because it was more economical than bronze, but was found not to be durable and manufacture ceased in the 1870s.

=== Casting ===
Small bells were originally made with the lost wax process but large bells are cast mouth downwards by filling the air space in a two-part mould with molten metal. Such a mould has an outer section clamped to a base-plate on which an inner core has been constructed.

The core is built on the base-plate using porous materials such as coke or brick, and then covered in loam (well mixed with straw and horse manure). This is given a profile corresponding to the inside shape of the finished bell and dried with gentle heat. Graphite and whiting are applied to form the final, smooth surface.

The outside of the mould is made within a perforated cast-iron case, larger than the finished bell, containing the loam mixture which is shaped, dried and smoothed in the same way as the core. The case is inverted (mouth down), lowered over the core and clamped to the base plate. The clamped mould is supported, usually by being buried in a casting pit to bear the weight of metal and to allow even cooling.

Historically, before rail or road transport of large bells was possible, a "bell pit" was often dug in the grounds of the building where the bell was to be installed. Molten bell metal is poured into the mould through a box lined with foundry sand. The founder would bring his casting tools to the site, and a furnace would be built next to the pit.

=== Bell tuning ===
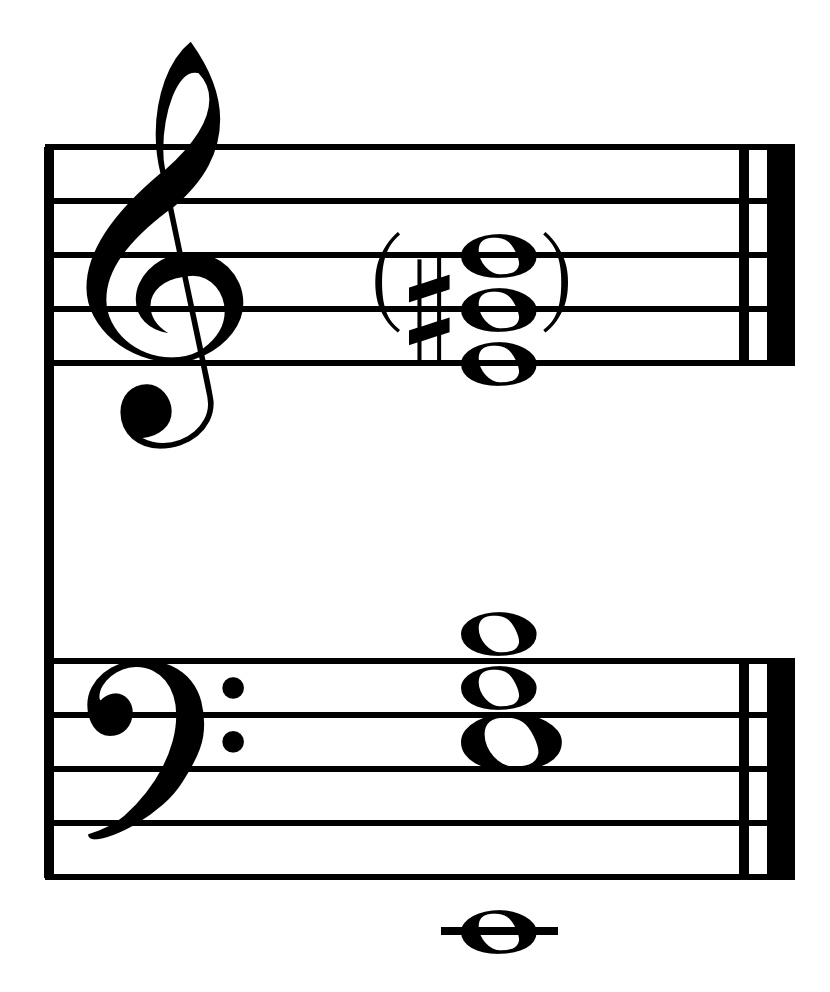
The principal harmonics of the Erfurt bell (1497) typical of a harmonically-tuned bell: (Note: Fuller-Maitland 1910, p. 615 notes the strike note shown on C. Hemony appears to be the first to propose this tuning.) strike note is E, with hum note an octave below, minor third, fifth, nominal above, and major third and perfect fifth in the second octave

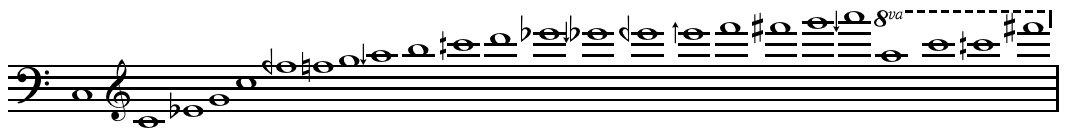
Spectrum of the tenor bell of Winchester Cathedral as analyzed by Jonathan Harvey using FFT (Note: Roads 1992, p. 92 states "a clearly audible, slow-decaying partial at 347 Hz with a beating component in it. It is a resultant of the various F harmonic series partials that can be clearly seen in the spectrum (5, [6], 7, 9, 11, 13, 17, etc.) beside the C-related partials".) "The bell produces a secondary pitch (f') which lies outside that 'inharmonic series though it is clearly audible when the bell is struck, 'to curiously thrilling and disturbing effect.'" The strike tone is middle C, the hum tone an octave below.

Large bells are generally around 80% copper and 20% tin (bell metal), which has been found empirically to give the most pleasant tone. However, the tone of a bell is mostly due to its shape. A bell is regarded as having a good tone when it is "in tune with itself". In western bell founding, this is known as "harmonic tuning" of a bell, which results in the bell's strongest harmonics being in harmony with each other and the strike note. This produces the brightest and purest sound, which is the attractive sound of a good bell. Much effort has been expended over the centuries to find the shape which will produce a harmonically tuned bell.

The accompanying musical staves show the series of harmonics which are generated when a bell is struck. The Erfurt bell is notable in that, although old, it is harmonically tuned—something atypical of its era. In the 17th century, Pieter and François Hemony cast many carillon bells of unequalled tuning quality. After their death, however, their guarded trade secrets were lost, and bells of comparable quality were not cast again until the 19th century. It was only in modern times that repeatable harmonic tuning using a known scientific basis was achieved. The main partials (or harmonics) of a well-tuned bell are:

- hum note (an octave below the named note)
- strike tone (also called tap note or named note)
- tierce (a minor third above named note)
- quint (a fifth above named note)
- nominal (an octave above named note)

Further, less-audible, harmonics include the major third and a perfect fifth in the second octave above the named note.

Over centuries of experimentation, founders have developed an optimum profile for casting each size of a bell to give true harmonic tuning. Although bells are cast to accurate patterns, variations in casting mean that a final tuning is necessary as the shape of the bell is critical in producing the desired strike note and associated harmonics. Tuning is undertaken by clamping the bell on a large rotating table and using a cutting tool to remove metal. This is an iterative process in which metal is removed from certain parts of the bell to change certain harmonics. Historically, this process was made possible by the use of tuning forks to find sympathetic resonance on specific parts of a bell for the harmonic being tuned, but today electronic strobe tuners are normally used. To tune the strike note, the nominal or the strike note are tuned; the effect is usually the same because the nominal is one of the main partials that determines the tone of the strike note. The thickness of a church bell at its thickest part, called the "sound bow", is usually one thirteenth its diameter. If the bell is mounted as cast, it is called a "maiden bell".

==== Major third bell ====
The traditional harmonically tuned bell has a minor third as a main harmonic. On the theory that western music in major keys may sound better on bells with a major third as a harmonic, production of bells with major thirds was attempted in the 1980s. Scientists at the Technical University in Eindhoven, using computer modelling, produced bell profiles which were cast by the Eijsbouts Bellfoundry in the Netherlands. They were described as resembling old Coke bottles in that they had a bulge around the middle; In 1999 a design without the bulge was announced. However, the major bell concept has found little favour; most bells cast today are almost universally minor third bells.

== Use in clock chimes ==
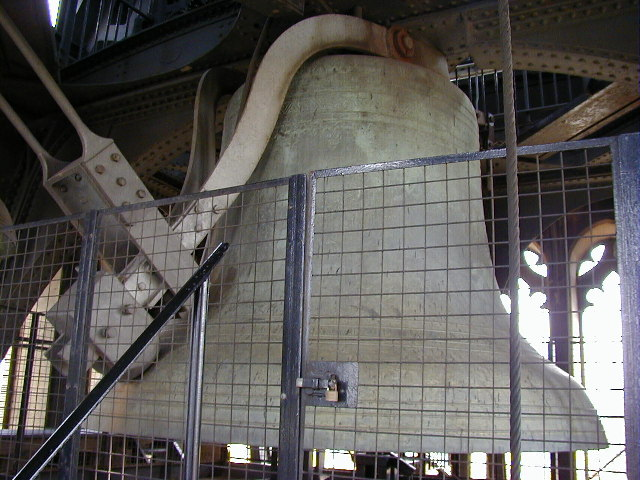
Big Ben in the Elizabeth Tower of the British Houses of Parliament

Bells are also associated with clocks, indicating the hour by the striking of bells. Indeed, the word clock comes from the Latin word Cloca, meaning bell. Bells in clock towers or bell towers can be heard over long distances, which was especially important in the time when clocks were too expensive for widespread ownership.

In the case of clock towers and grandfather clocks, a particular sequence of tones may be played to distinguish between the hour, half-hour, quarter-hour, or other intervals. One common pattern is called "Westminster Quarters", a sixteen-note pattern named after the Palace of Westminster which popularized it as the measure used by Big Ben.

== Notable bells ==
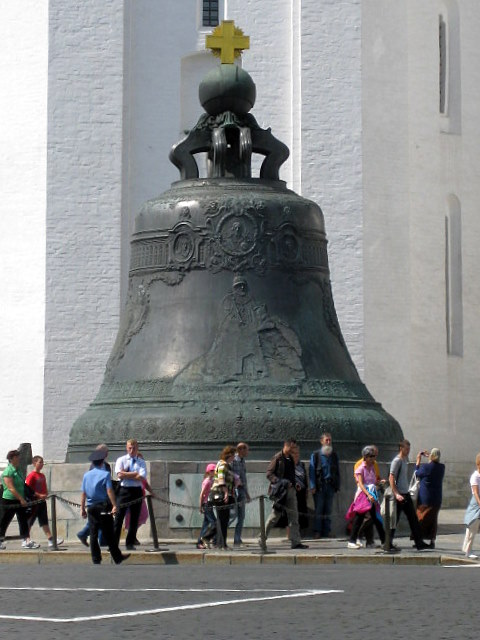
The Tsar Bell with humans for perspective

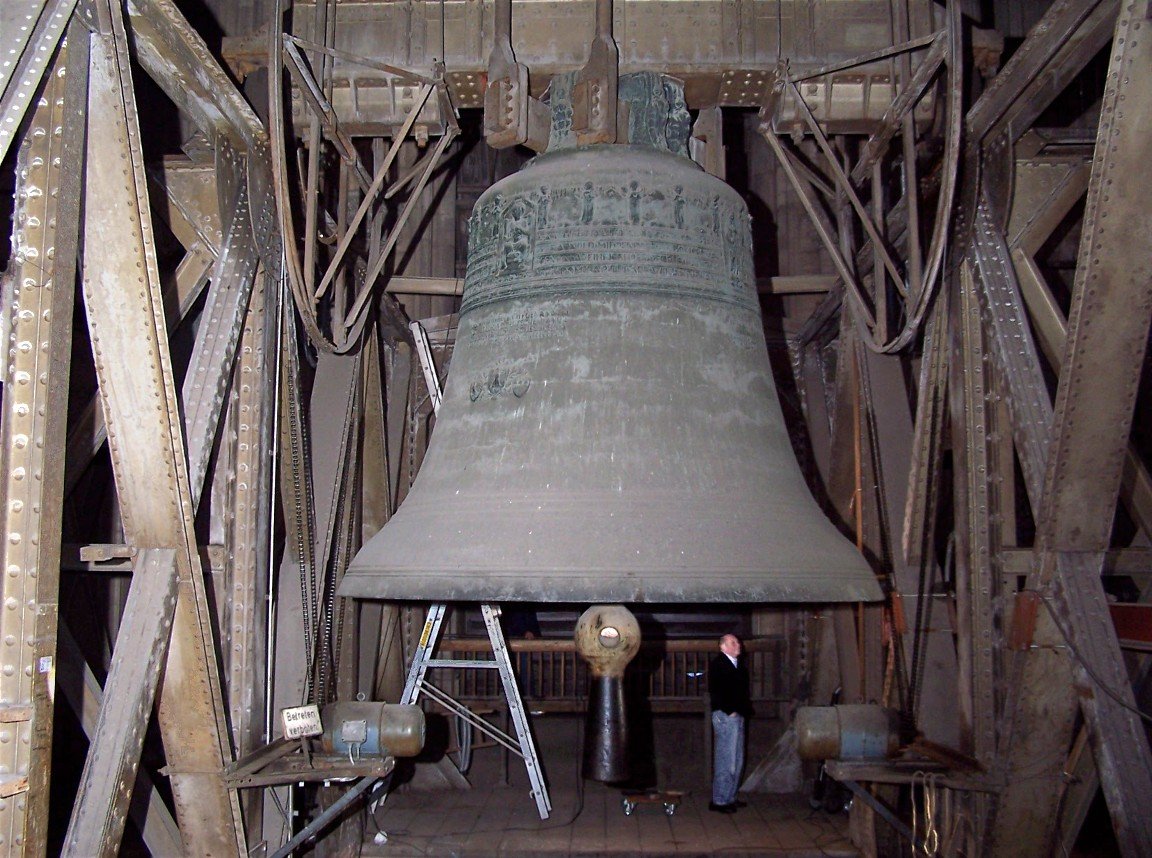
Petersglocke, Cologne Cathedral, with person for scale

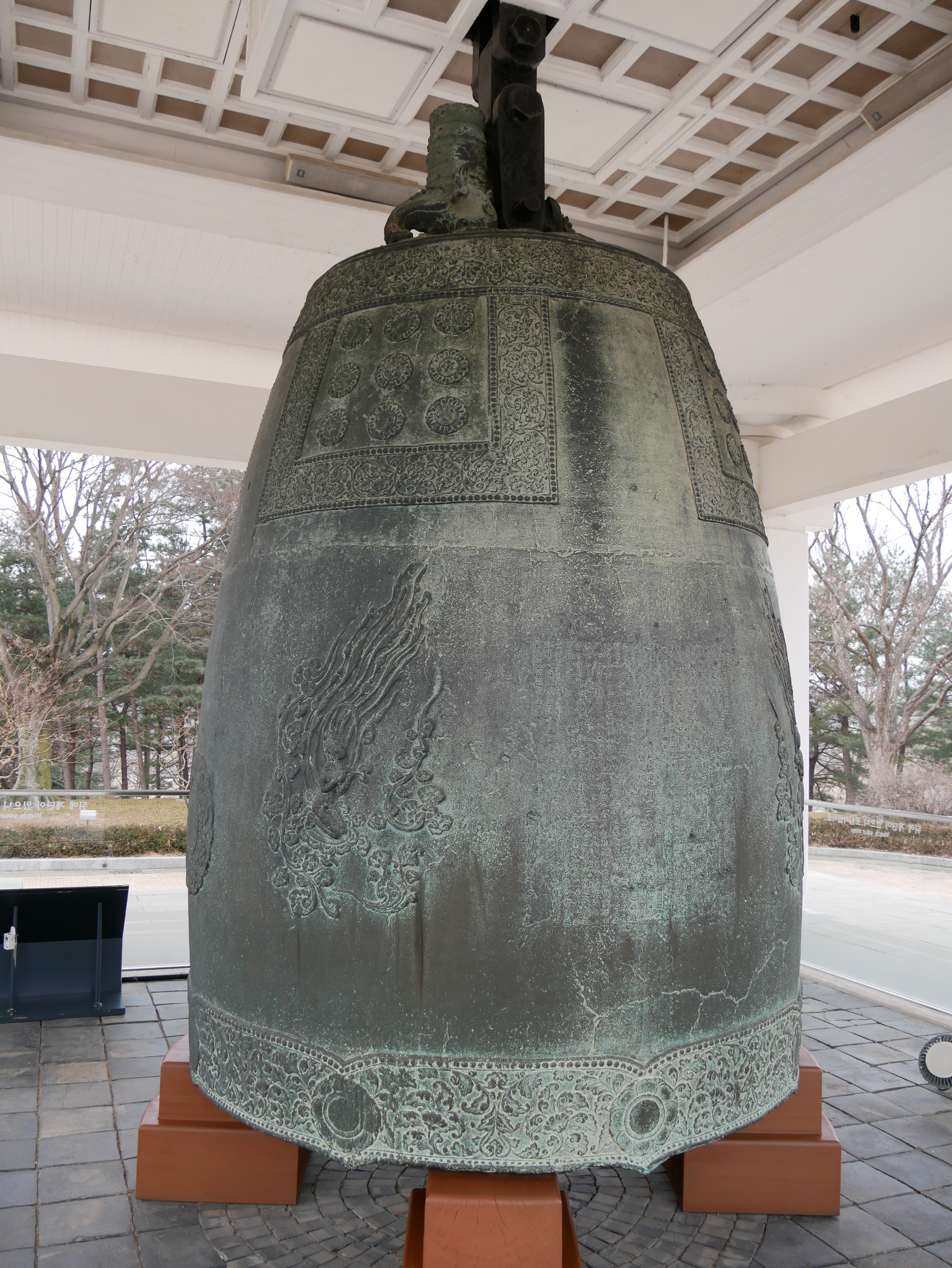
Bell of King Seongdeok, Gyeongju National Museum, South Korea

- The Great Bell of Dhammazedi (1484) may have been the largest bell ever made. It was lost in a river in Burma after being removed from a temple by the Portuguese in 1608. It is reported to have weighed about 300 tonnes (330 tons).
- The Tsar Bell by the Motorin Bellfounders is the largest bell still in existence. It weighs 160 tonnes (180 tons), but it was never rung and broke in 1737. It is on display in Moscow, Russia, inside the Kremlin.
- The Great Mingun Bell is the largest functioning bell. It is located in Mingun, Burma, and weighs 90 tonnes (100 tons).
- The Gotenba Bell is the largest functioning swinging bell, weighing 79,900 pounds (36,200 kg). It is located in a tourist resort in Gotenba, Japan. Hung in a freestanding frame, it is rung by hand. It was cast by Eijsbouts in 2006.
- The World Peace Bell was the largest functioning swinging bell until 2006. It is located in Newport, Kentucky, United States, and was cast by the Paccard Foundry of France. The bell itself weighs 66,000 pounds (30,000 kg); with clapper and supports. The total weight which swings when the bell is rung is 89,390 pounds (40,550 kg).
- The largest Bell of the People's Salvation Cathedral is the largest free-swinging church bell in the world, surpassing the Petersglocke of Cologne Cathedral. Weighing more than 25 tons, it was cast by the Grassmayr Bell Foundry on the 11th of November 2016 and has a height of 3,130 mm, thickness of 273 mm.
- The Bell of King Seongdeok is the largest extant bell in Korea. The full Korean name means "Sacred Bell of King Seongdeok the Great". It was also known as the Bell of Bongdeoksa Temple, where it was first housed. The bell weighs about 25 tons and was originally cast in 771 CE. It is now stored in the National Museum of Gyeongju.
- Pummerin in Vienna's Stephansdom is the most famous bell in Austria and the fifth largest in the world.
- The St. Petersglocke, in the local dialect of Cologne also called dä Dicke Pitter ("Fat Peter"), is a bell in Germany's Cologne Cathedral. It weighs 24 tons and was cast in 1922. It is the largest functioning free-swinging bell in the world that swings from its top. (The Gotenba Bell and the World Peace Bell swing around their center of gravity, which is more like turning than swinging. So, depending on the point of view, the St. Petersglocke may be considered the largest free-swinging bell in the world.)
- Maria Dolens, the bell for the Fallen in Rovereto, Italy, weighs 22.6 tons.
- The South West tower of St Paul's Cathedral in London, England, houses Great Paul, the second largest bell at 16.5 tons in the British Isles. One can hear Great Paul booming out over Ludgate Hill at 1300 every day.
- The Olympic Bell, commissioned and cast for the 2012 London Olympic Games, is the largest harmonically-tuned bell in the world.
- Big Ben is the fourth-largest bell in the British Isles, after The Olympic Bell (used at the opening of the 2012 Olympic Games), Great Paul (St Paul's Cathedral, City of London) and Great George (Liverpool Cathedral). Big Ben is the hour bell of the Great Clock in the Elizabeth Tower (formerly called the Clock Tower) at the Palace of Westminster, the Houses of Parliament.
- The Dom Tower in the city of Utrecht, the Netherlands, houses the Salvator, weighing 8.2 tons and cast in 1505 by Geert van Wou.
- Great Tom is the bell that hangs in Tom Tower (designed by Christopher Wren) of Christ Church, Oxford. It was cast in 1680 and weighs over 6 tons. Great Tom is still rung 101 times at 21:05 every night to signify the 101 original scholars of the college.
- The Liberty Bell is a 2,080 pounds (940 kg) American bell of great historic significance, located in Philadelphia, Pennsylvania. It previously hung in Independence Hall.
- Sigismund is a 12 tonne bell in the Wawel Cathedral in Kraków, Poland, cast in 1520. It is rung only on very significant national occasions.
- The Maria Gloriosa in Erfurt Cathedral, Germany, was cast by Geert van Wou in 1497, weighs more than 12,500 kg (13 tons) and is the world's largest medieval free-swinging bell.
- The Lutine Bell is the ship's bell of the wrecked HMS Lutine, weighs 106 pounds (48 kg) and bears the inscription "ST. JEAN – 1779". It rests in the Lloyd's of London Underwriting Room, where it used to be struck when news of an overdue ship arrived—once for the loss of a ship (i.e., bad news, last in 1979), and twice for her return (i.e., good news, last in 1989).
- The tenor (heaviest bell) of the change-ringing peal at Liverpool Cathedral is the heaviest bell hung for full-circle ringing.

== Usage as musical instruments ==
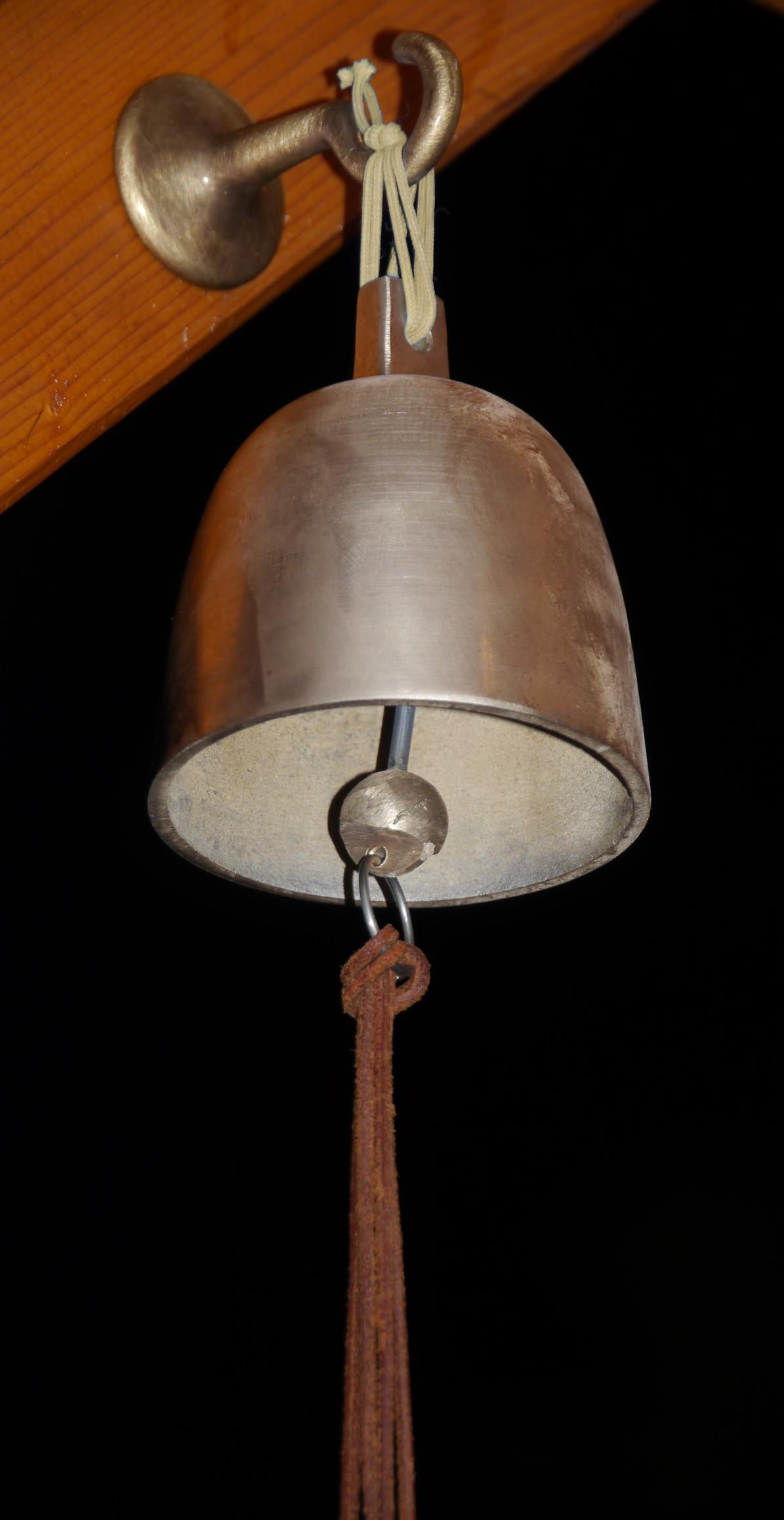
A bell out of bronze with its principal tone at 1133 Hertz

Some bells are used as musical instruments, such as carillons, (clock) chimes, agogô, or ensembles of bell-players, called bell choirs, using hand-held bells of varying tones. (Note: Examples of carillons can be found here: "Carillon". Musiconis Database. Université Paris-Sorbonne.) A "ring of bells" is a set of four to twelve or more bells used in change ringing, a particular method of ringing bells in patterns. A peal in changing ringing may have bells playing for several hours, playing 5,000 or more patterns without a break or repetition. They have also been used in many kinds of popular music, such as in AC/DC's "Hells Bells" and Metallica's "For Whom the Bell Tolls".

=== Ancient Chinese bells ===
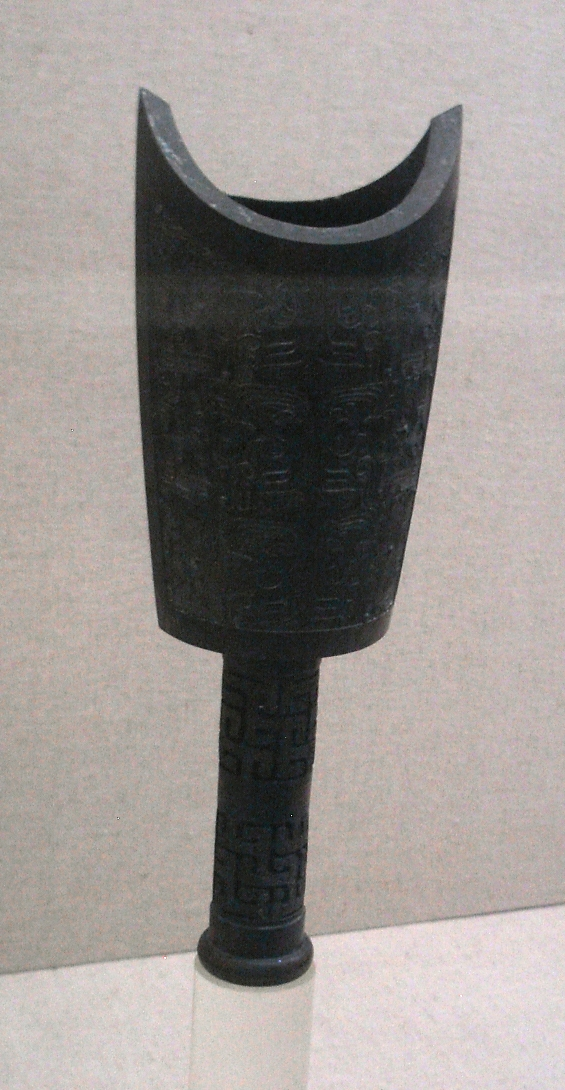
A Warring States-era zheng (钲) bell from Baoshan 2 Tomb in Jingmen, Hubei

The ancient Chinese bronze chime bells called bianzhong or zhong / zeng (鐘) were used as polyphonic musical instruments, some examples having been dated at between 2000 and 3600 years old. Tuned bells have been created and used for musical performance in many cultures, but Zhong are unique from other types of cast bells in several respects and rank among some of the most advanced products of ancient Chinese bronze casting technology. However, the method of their design and casting—known only to the Chinese in antiquity—was lost in later generations, and was not fully rediscovered and understood until the 20th century.

In 1978, a complete ceremonial set of 65 Zhong bells was found in a near-perfect state of preservation during the excavation of the tomb of Marquis Yi, ruler of Zeng, one of the Warring States. Their special shape allows them to produce two different musical tones depending on where they are struck.The interval between these notes on each bell is either a major or minor third, equivalent to a distance of four or five notes on a piano.

The bells of Marquis Yi were still fully playable after almost 2500 years. Though their range spans slightly less than five octaves, the dual-tone capability of each bell allows the complete set to sound a 12-tone scale, predating the European 12-tone system by some 2000 years. The bells are also capable of playing melodies in diatonic and pentatonic scales.

Another related ancient Chinese musical instrument is qing (磬 pinyin qìng), made from stone rather than metal.

In more recent times, the tops of bells in China have usually been decorated with a small dragon, known as pulao; the figure of the dragon served as a hook for hanging the bell.

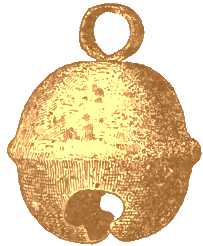
This copper bell was made by pre-Columbian North American natives.

=== Konguro'o ===
Konguro'o is a small bell which, like the Djalaajyn, was first used for utilitarian purposes and only later for artistic ones. Konguro'o rang when moving to new places. They were fastened to the horse harnesses and created a very specific "smart" sound background. Konguro'o also hung on the neck of the leader goat, which the sheep herd followed. This led to the association in folk memory between the distinctive sound of konguro'o and the nomadic way of life.

To make this instrument, Kyrgyz foremen used copper, bronze, iron and brass. They also decorated it with artistic carving and covered it with silver. Sizes of the instruments might vary within certain limits, which depended on its function. Every bell had its own timbre.

=== Chimes ===
A variant on the bell is the tubular bell. Several of these metal tubes which are struck manually with hammers, form an instrument named tubular bells or chimes. In the case of wind or aeolian chimes, the tubes are blown against one another by the wind.

=== Skrabalai ===
The skrabalai is a traditional folk instrument in Lithuania which consists of wooden bells of various sizes hanging in several vertical rows, with one or two small wooden or metal clappers hanging inside them. It is played with two wooden sticks. When the skrabalai is moved, a clapper knocks at the wall of the trough. The pitch of the sound depends on the size of the wooden trough. The instrument developed from wooden cowbells that shepherds would tie to cows' necks.

== Farm bells ==
Whereas the church and temple bells called to mass or religious service, bells were used on farms for more secular signalling. The greater farms in Scandinavia usually had a small bell-tower resting on the top of the barn or the stabbur. The bell was used to call the workers from the field at the end of the day's work.

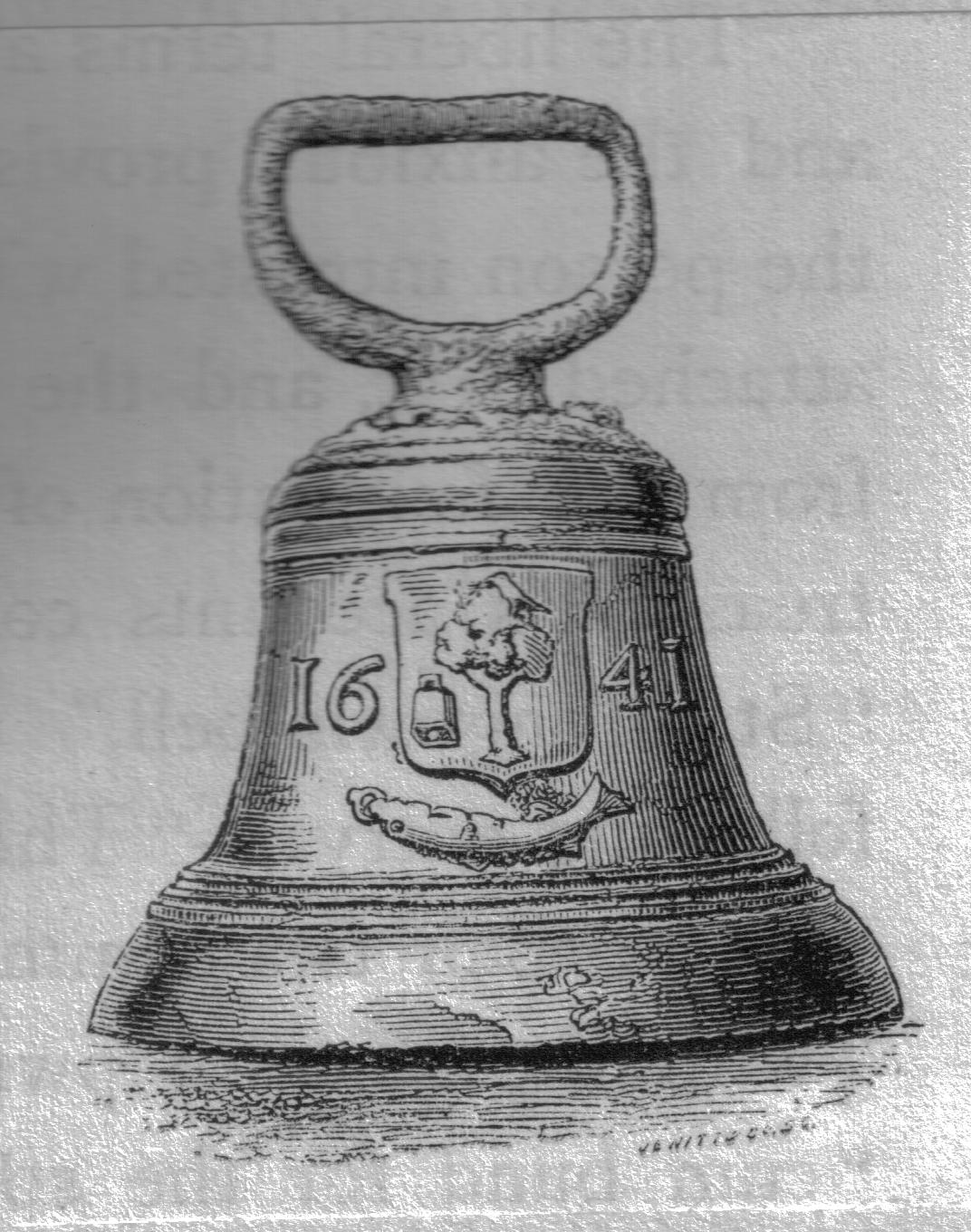
The Glasgow 'Dead or Deid bell' of 1642

In folk tradition, it is recorded that each church and possibly several farms had their specific rhymes connected to the sound of the specific bells. An example is the Pete Seeger and Idris Davies song "The Bells of Rhymney".

== Dead bell ==
In Scotland, up until the nineteenth century, it was the tradition to ring a dead bell, a form of handbell, at the death of an individual and at the funeral.

== Bell study and ringing organizations ==
Numerous organizations promote the ringing, study, music, collection, preservation and restoration of bells, including:

- The American Bell Association International (United States with foreign chapters)
- Central Council of Church Bell Ringers (worldwide) – promotes English style full circle change ringing
- The Guild of Carillonneurs in North America (Canada, Mexico, United States)

== Gallery ==
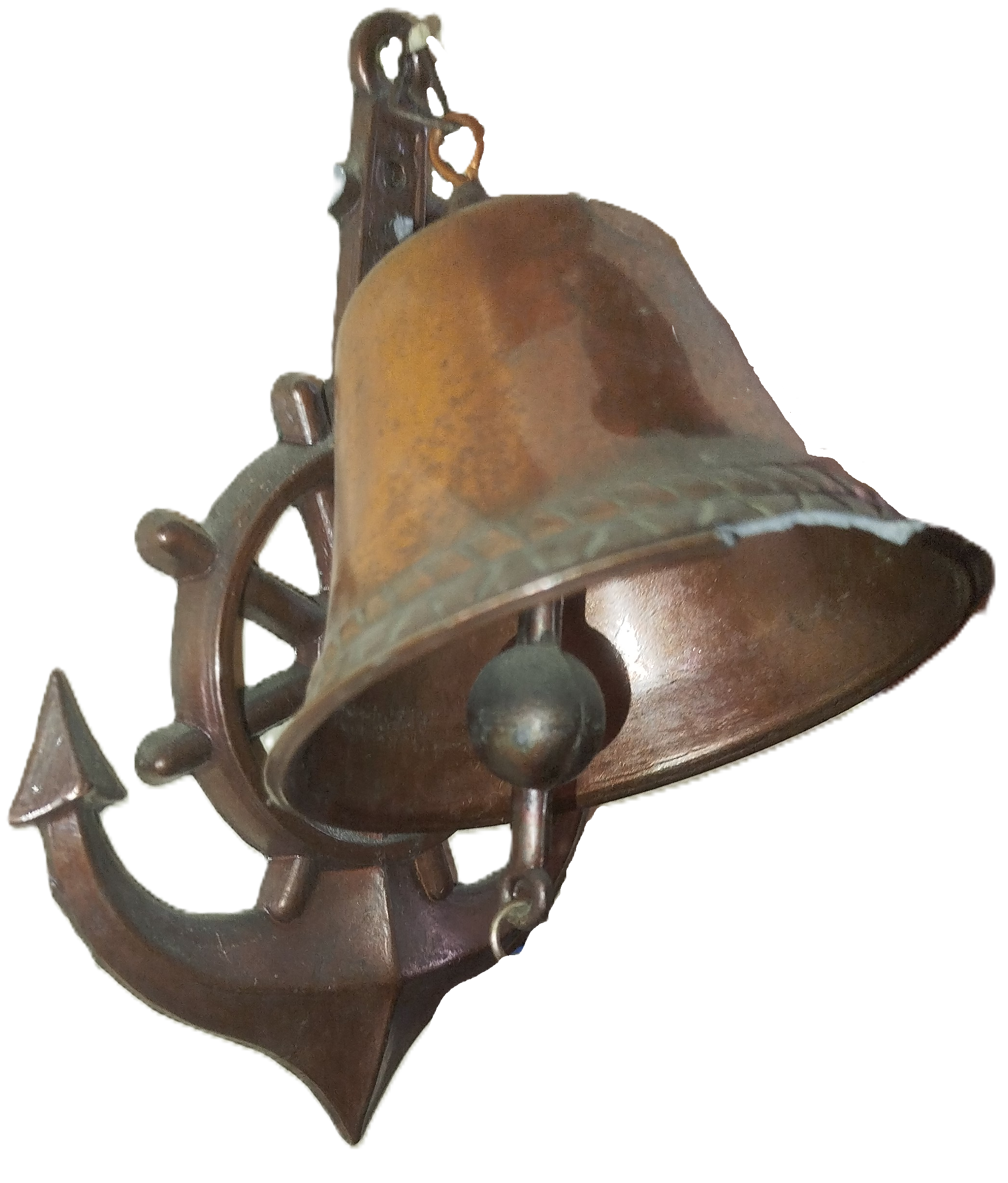
A small house bell, Greece

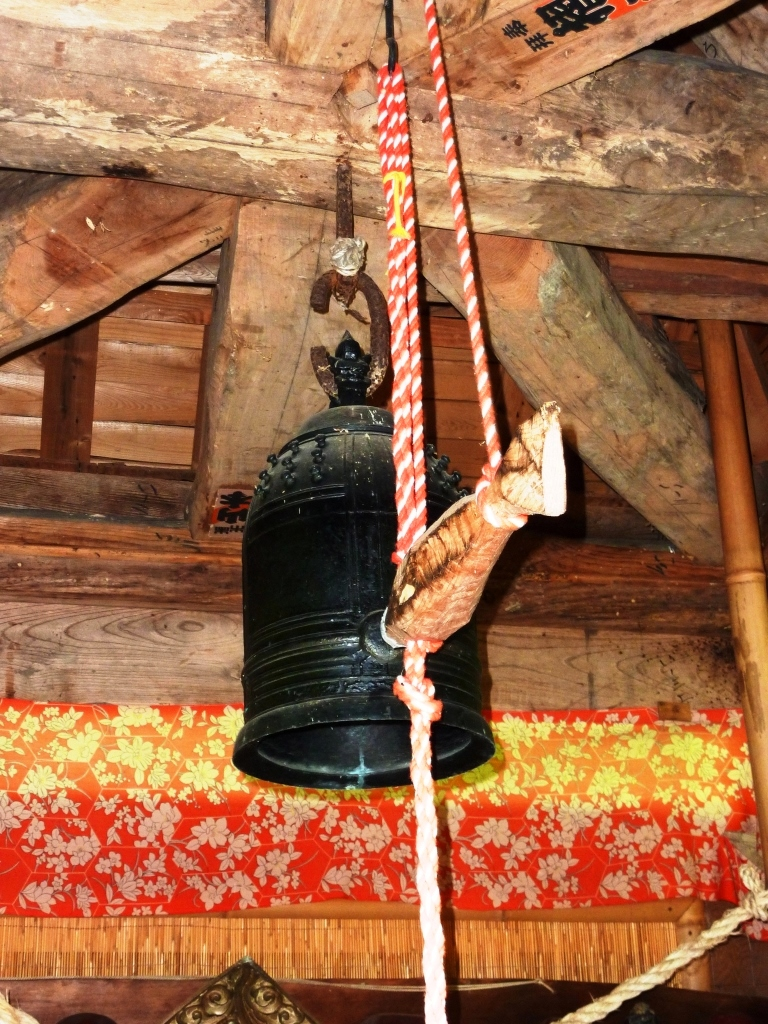
Temple bell and clapper. Banna-ji. Japan.

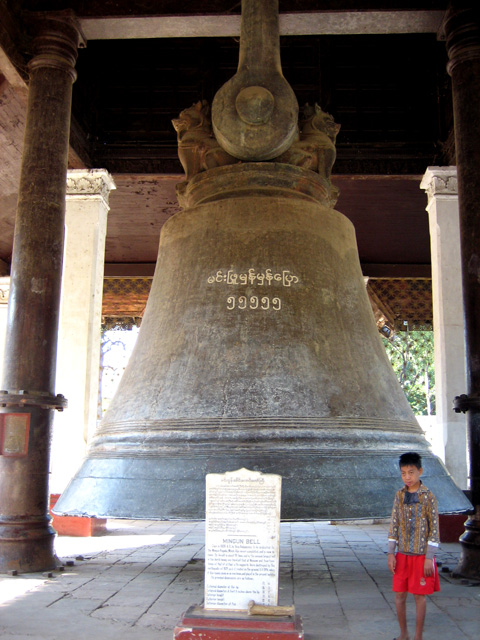
Mingun Bell weighs 55,555 viss, or 90 tonnes.

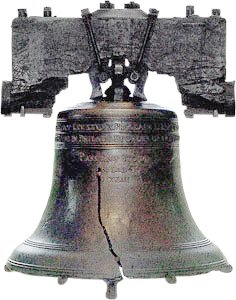
Philadelphia's Liberty Bell.

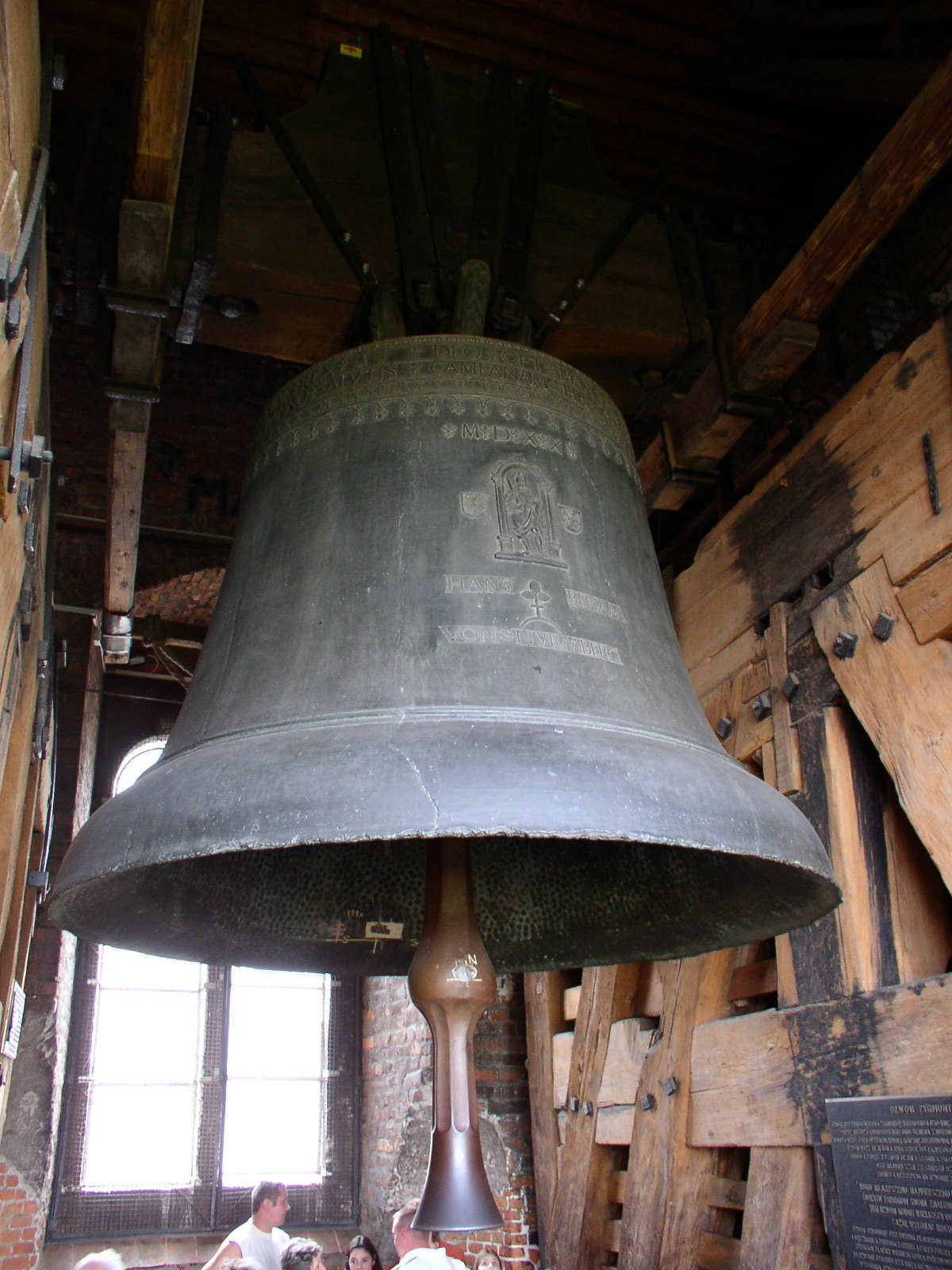
The Zygmunt (Sigismund) Bell (from 1520) in Kraków, Poland.

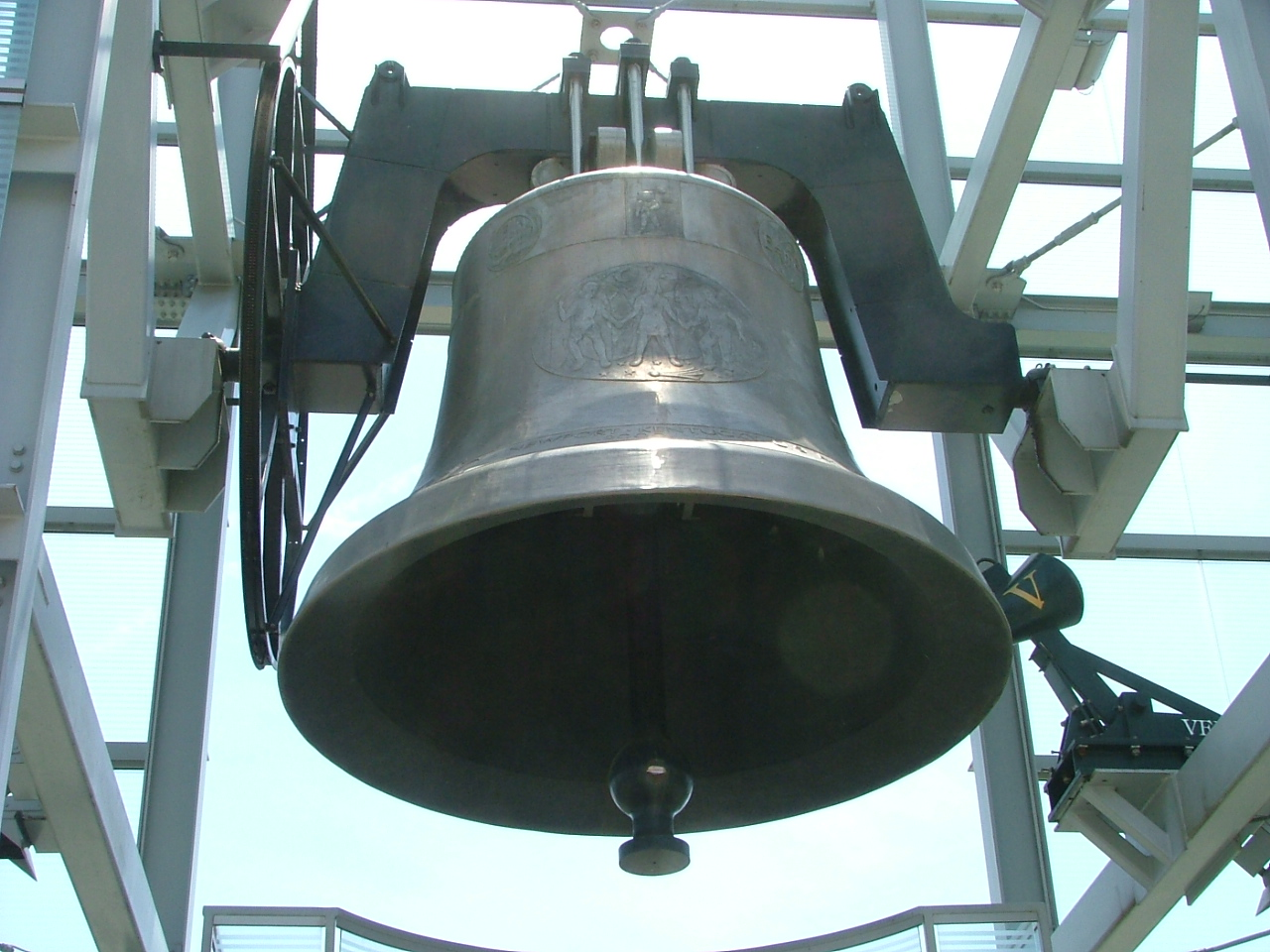
The World Peace Bell in Kentucky.

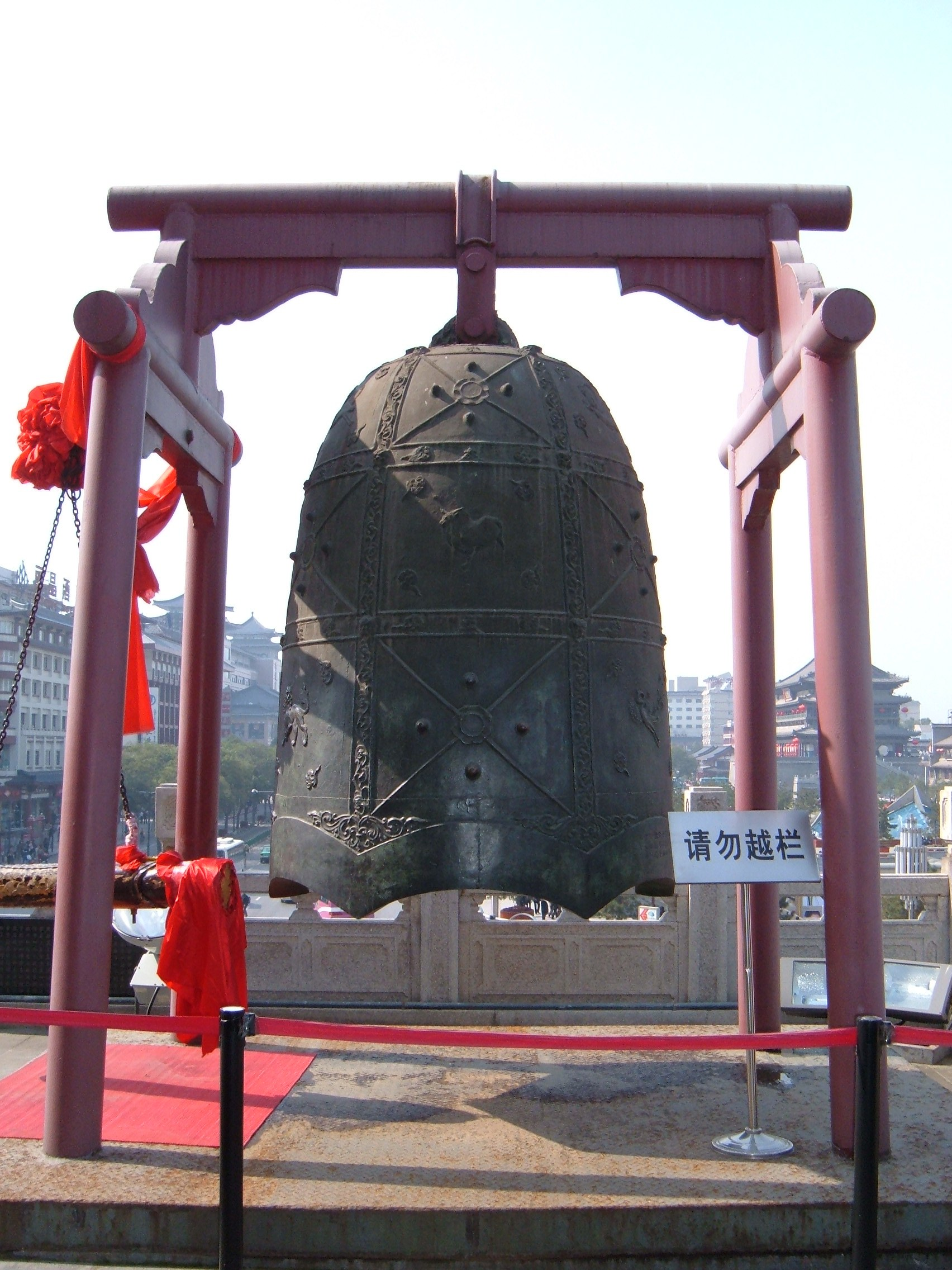
Bronze jingyun bell cast in the year 711 AD, Xi'an.

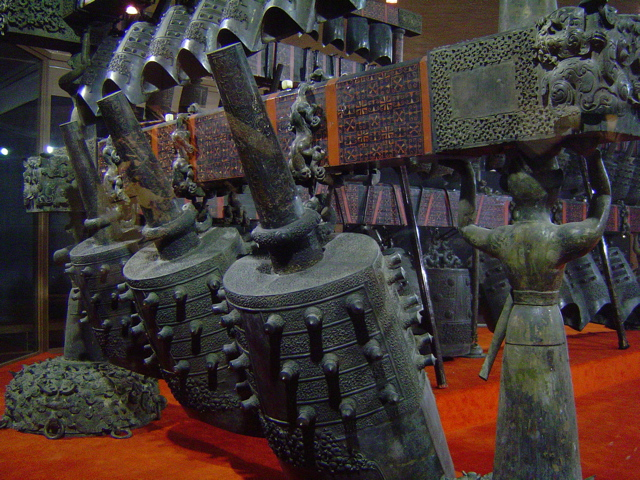
Chinese bells from the ancient Warring States, Hubei Provincial Museum, Wuhan, China.

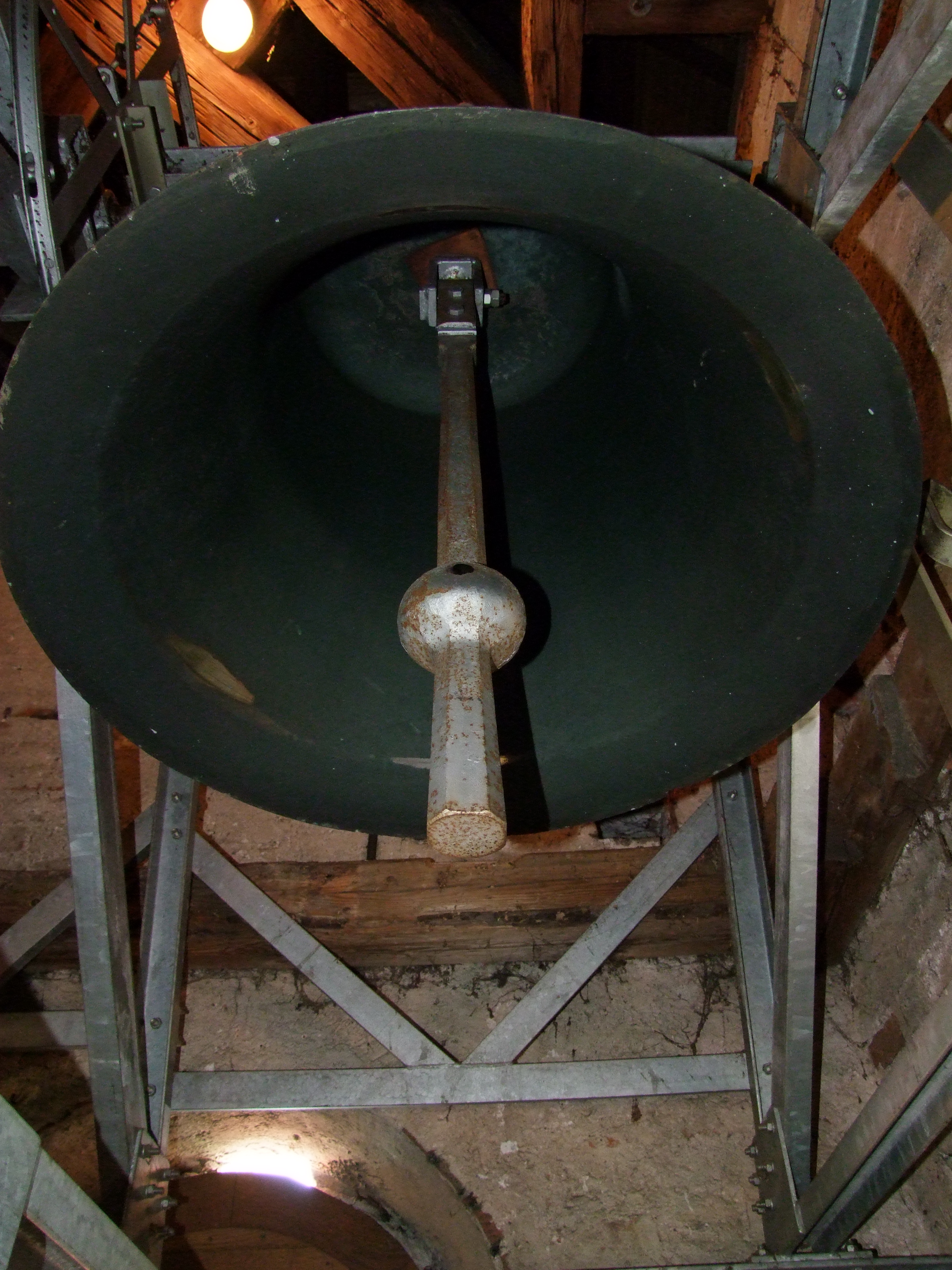
St. Ulrich, Memmingen

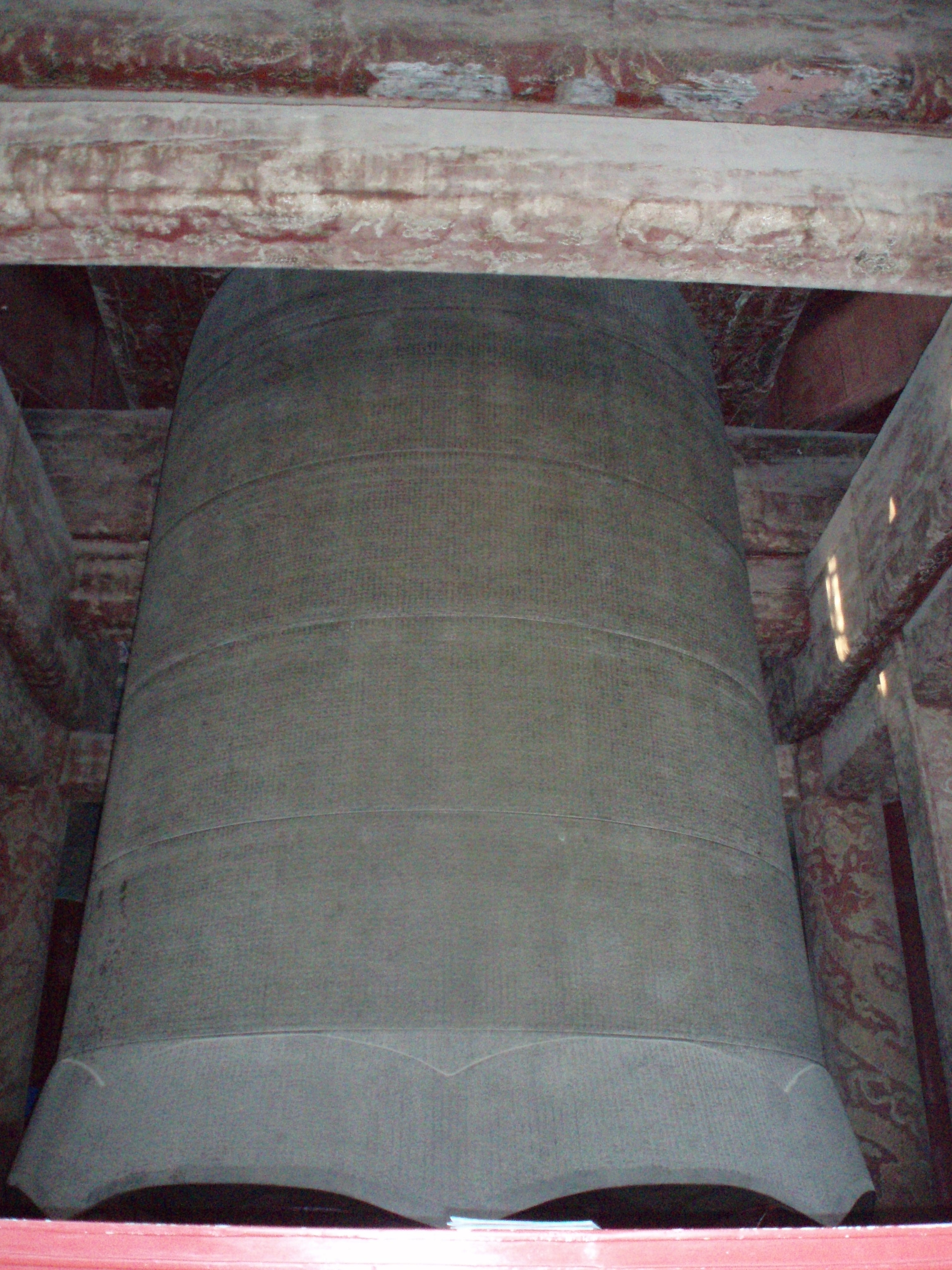
Yongle Bell

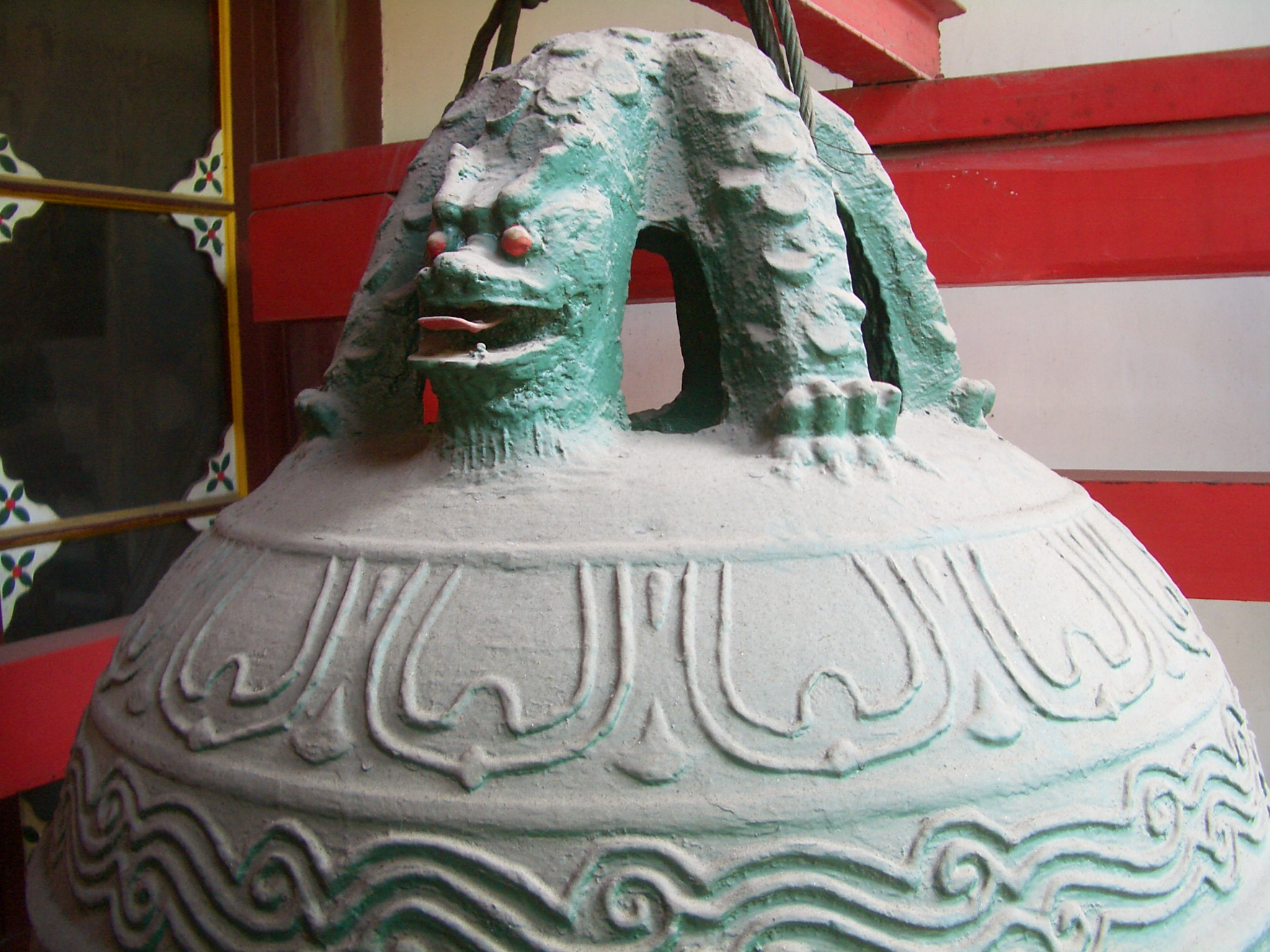
A bell in Chang Chun Temple, Wuhan, hanging on its pulao

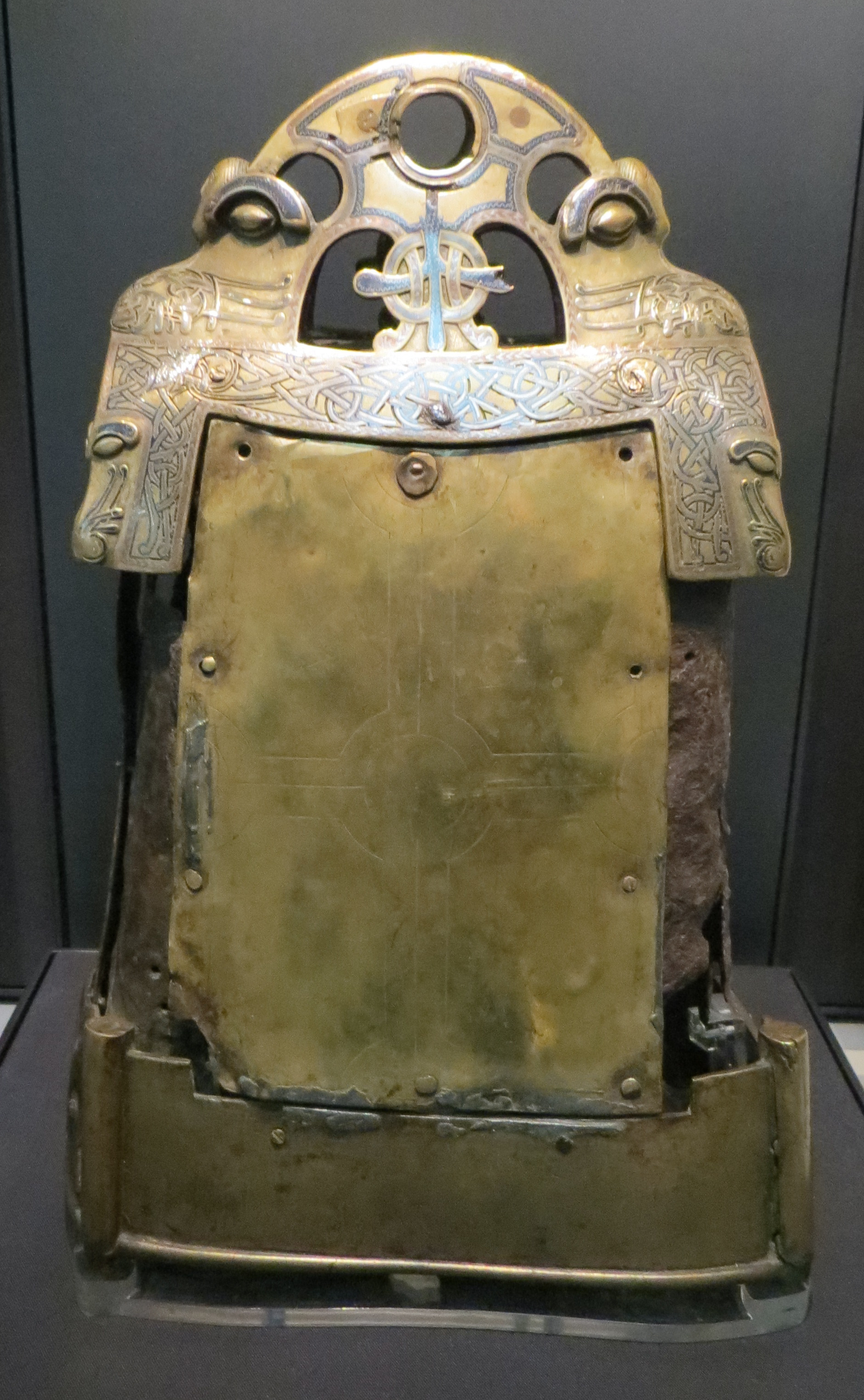
St Cuileain's Bell from Ireland, 7th-8th Century AD (British Museum)

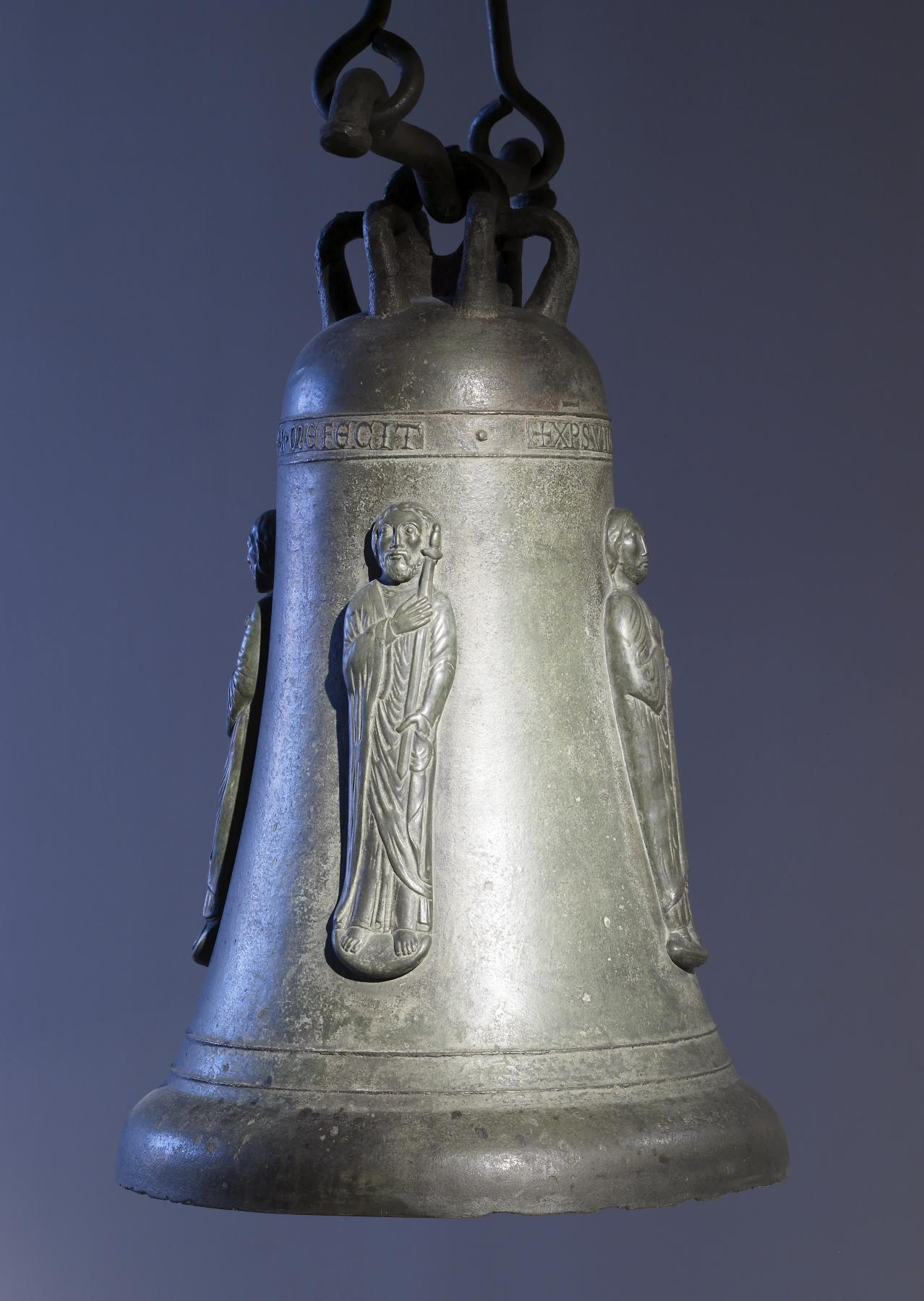
Bronze bell from the second half of the fourteenth century, depicting Saints Peter, Paul, John the Evangelist, and Thomas.

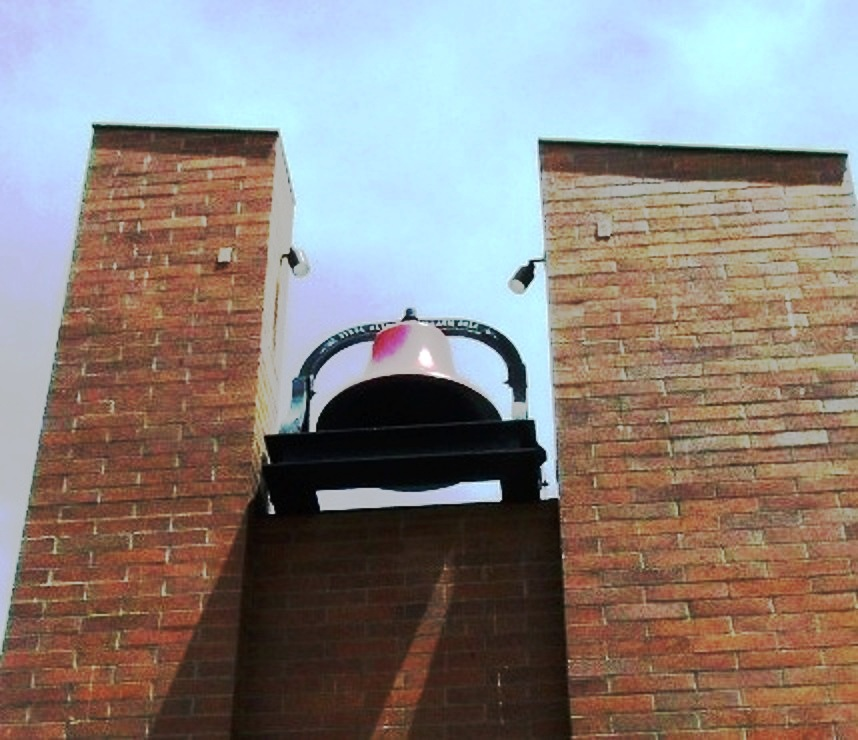
Fire Bell, Glendale, Arizona.

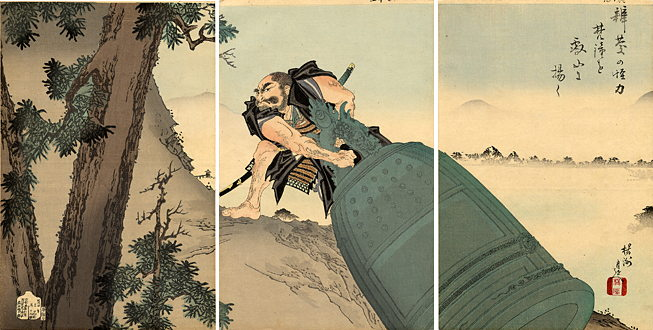
The bell as depicted in fine art: This triptych depicts Benkei carrying the giant bell of Mii-dera Buddhist temple up Hei-zan Mountain. – Chikanobu Toyohara, c. 1890.

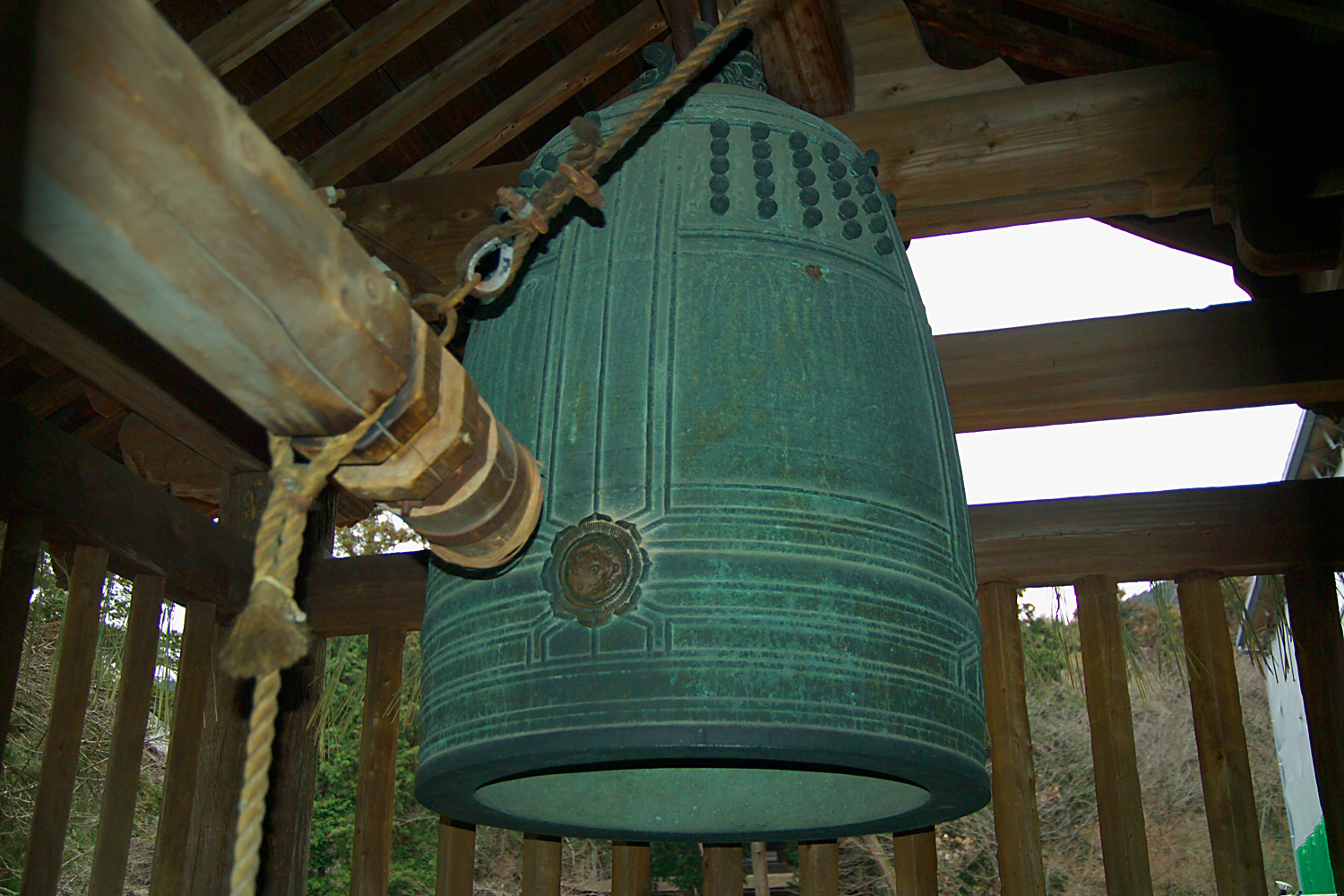
This bell is called Mii-dera no Bansho (三井寺の晩鐘), the evening bell at Mii-dera, a Buddhist temple in Otsu, which is near Lake Biwa in Shiga Prefecture, Japan. This image shows the hanging wooden beam positioned to strike the outer side of the resonating surface.

== See also ==
- American Bell Association International
- Bellhop
- Bicycle bell
- Bermuda carriage bell
- Cat bell
- Cowbell
- Doorbell
- Division bell
- Electric bell
- Electronic tuners, used to tune bells
- Glockenspiel
- Handbell
- National Bell Festival
- John Taylor Bellfounders
- School bell
- Ship's bell
- Suzu
- Train bell
- Veronese bellringing art
- Whitechapel Bell Foundry
