= WOU (disambiguation) =

WOU or Wou may refer to:

== Organizations ==
- Western Oregon University, a public university in Monmouth, Oregon
- Wawasan Open University, a private university located in Penang, Malaysia
- WOU (AM), a short-lived radio station in Omaha, Nebraska, United States

== People ==
- Geert van Wou, a Dutch bellfounder
- Gerrit van Wou, a Dutch musician
