= Peace Bell =

Peace Bell may refer to:

- Japanese Peace Bell at the Headquarters of the United Nations in New York, New York, United States
- World Peace Bell (Newport, Kentucky), United States
- Peace Bell at Imjingak Park, Paju, South Korea
- Peace Bell (Hiroshima), Hiroshima Peace Memorial Park
