= Gloriosa =

Gloriosa can refer to:

- Gloriosa (plant), a genus of plants in the family Colchicaceae
- Gloriosa (poem), a concert band work composed by Yasuhide Ito
- Gloriosa, a medieval bell in Erfurt Cathedral, Germany
