= WPBA =

WPBA may refer to:

- Women's Professional Billiard Association, officially known as the WPBA
- World Peace Bell Association, a Japanese organization
- World Pool-Billiard Association, incorrectly; its official acronym is WPA, to avoid confusion with the Women's Professional Billiard Association (see above), which pre-dates the WPA
- WABE-TV, an Atlanta, Georgia (US) PBS member television station, which held the call sign WPBA from 1984 to 2022
