= World Peace Bell (Newport, Kentucky) =

Commemorative bell in the United States

Coordinates: 39°5.5362′N 84°29.74454′W

Specifications
Weight:	66,000 lb (30,000 kg)
Diameter:	12 feet (3.7 m)
Material:	80% copper, 20% tin
Yoke:	16,512 pounds (7,490 kg)
Clapper:	6,878 pounds (3,120 kg)
Location:	Newport, Kentucky, United States
Casting Date:	December 11, 1998
Musical note:	A

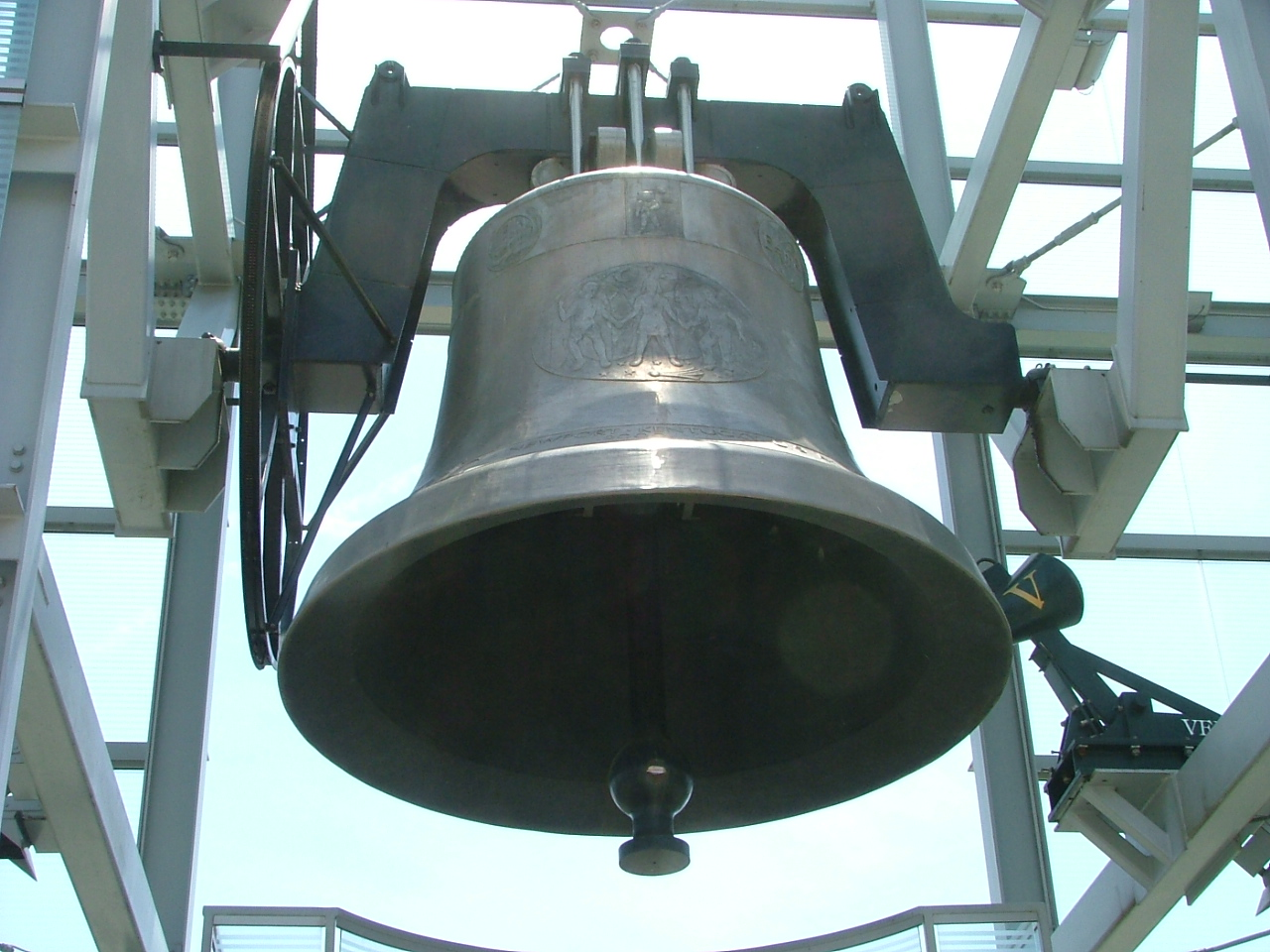
World Peace Bell

The World Peace Bell is an international, commemorative bell that ceremonially opened the twenty-first century at 1 January 2000 (00:00:00 EST) with its first swing. It is a secular bell not associated with any single group, but all mankind collectively. As such, its founding was a collaborative, international civic operation (executed under the auspices of organizations in the United States and France).

Its widely-broadcast dedication took place on December 31, 1999, in the bell's permanent home of Newport, Kentucky (Greater Cincinnati) in the hours preceding its inaugural swing. In keeping with its secular theme of world peace, the bell features an inscription invoking the Universal Declaration of Human Rights and engravings marking important events from the past thousand years.

It is a traditional, Western-style swing bell. The Peace Bell weighs 30,000 kg (66,000 lb) and boasts a width of 3.7 m (12 feet) wide. Until 2006, it was the largest, functional swinging bell ever successfully produced.

Though it is the largest bell dedicated to peace internationally, it is not a part of the Japanese peace bell program, which has installed over twenty Eastern-style temple bells across the globe.

== History ==
The plan in 1997 was to cast the bell near Newport, Kentucky, in an on-site foundry. The bell would have hung in a 1,400-foot (430 m) Millennium Monument tower to open on New Year's Eve 1999, with an 85-bell carillon featuring this bell as its largest. At first the bell was called "The Millennium Bell." Later the plans were reduced to a smaller tower for the bell with an accompanying museum.

The Verdin Company managed the project on the U.S. side on behalf of the Millennium Monument Company. On December 11, 1998, the 50th anniversary of the Universal Declaration of Human Rights, the bell was cast on the premises of a ship propeller foundry in Nantes, France, under the strict supervision of staff from French bellfounders Fonderie Paccard of Annecy. The mastermind behind this bell was veteran bellfounder Pierre Paccard who accomplished this mammoth feat together with his sons, Philippe and Cyril Paccard, under the close collaboration of Master Founder Miguel Lopez.

The World Peace Bell was first rung in Nantes on March 20, 1999, in a public ceremony. It then underwent a month-and-a-half-long sea voyage from France to the U.S. port of New Orleans, Louisiana, where the bell was made part of that city's Fourth of July celebration. The bell was then transported by barge up the Mississippi and Ohio Rivers, making stops in 14 cities along the way and arriving at its final destination in northern Kentucky on August 1. Its arrival coincided with the 1999 Tall Stacks Festival, held along the Cincinnati-Covington-Newport section of the Ohio River. This event was named the nation's "Top Tourism Event" by the American Bus Association in 1999.

For the first time in the U.S., the bell was rung by swinging on January 1, 2000, at midnight. Struck twelve times, its peal was heard for distances of about 25 miles (40 km).

The striker is of cast iron and was produced at Cast-Fab Technologies, Inc., in Cincinnati, Ohio. A special iron was used to prevent the striker from damaging the bell when it hits the outside rim of the bell (see right side of photo). The striker allows the bell to be chimed without swinging it.

The bell tower and the bell and most of the other components of the Millennium Monument, were produced at companies local to the Newport, Kentucky, area. The World Peace Bell Center was located at 425 York Street, Newport, Kentucky, 41071. In May 2024, city commissioners announced the bell would be removed from the York Street site to make room for a new hotel and office development. On August 1, 2024, workers and equipment removed the bell and trucked it to a temporary location. City leaders hope to find a suitable site on the riverfront to permanently install the bell at a later date.

== See also ==
- Japanese Peace Bell
- Korean Bell of Friendship
