= Bermuda carriage bell =

A Bermuda carriage bell is a bowl-sized bell with a pleasant tone. It is rung by means of a plunger button stemming from the center top of the bell. Originally, the bell was mounted on the floor of a vehicle and operated by foot as a warning for pedestrians.

A Bermuda carriage bell was also used to provide the Daily Double sound effect on the original version of Jeopardy! hosted by Art Fleming.
