= Gert Cantor =

Gert Cantor (fl. 1567) was a Dutch musician active in Sweden.

Born in the Netherlands, his original Dutch name was Gerrit van Wou, grandson of the famed clockmaker Geert van Wou.

He was engaged as a court musician at the royal court of Eric XIV of Sweden. He was employed in the household of Eric already during Eric's tenure as a Crown Prince in Kalmar, and was appointed as a musician and a singer to the Kungliga Hovkapellet when Eric became king in 1560. He often performed during the festivities, concerts, banquets and balls at court.

He was also known as a personal favourite and confidant of King Eric, and noted to have performed several personal services in the intimate private life of the king.

Aside from his position as a court musician, Gert Cantor and his wife Karin also managed an inn, which was often frequented by the guests of the royal court; the envoy of the Holy Roman Emperor Jakob von Beczek, for example, was known to use the inn for his lodgings.

Cantor is known in history for being the person who introduced Eric XIV to his future lover and queen, Karin Månsdotter, who was employed as a serving girl in his inn. In reality, it would not have been Cantor himself but his wife, Karin, who managed the inn, employed Karin Månsdotter, and introduced her to the king. A sign of this was the fact that when Karin Månsdotter became the king's lover, he sent a silver belt to Gert Cantor's wife Karin as a sign of his gratitude to her for introducing him to Karin Månsdotter. Gert Cantor's wife, Karin, is also noted several times in the list of the members of Karin Månsdotter's household during her tenure as the king's mistress.

On 21 June 1567, a heated argument and a violent scene took place between Gert Cantor and Eric XIV, during which the latter was reportedly close to striking him down with his sword or dagger. When the king sent his guards to arrest Cantor the following day, Cantor had already left his quarters, the court and presumably Sweden.
