= World Peace Bell Association =

Japanese charity organisation

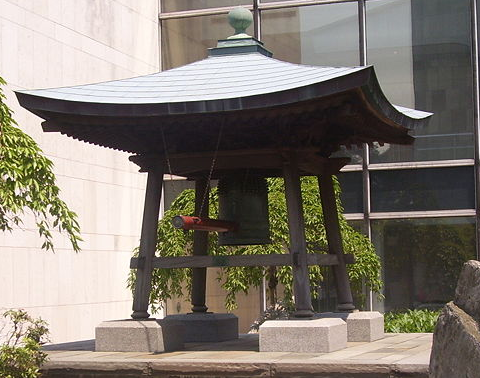
The Japanese Peace Bell at the UN headquarters in New York, the first bell donated by the World Peace Bell Association

The World Peace Bell Association (WPBA) is a Japanese organisation which attempts to raise awareness of the World peace movement by casting and installing Japanese temple bells in locations around the world.

The association was effectively begun in 1954 by Chiyoji Nakagawa, with the goal of providing peace bells to every country in the world. As mayor of Uwajima, he oversaw the replacement of the temple bell at Taihei temple in the aftermath or the Second World War. The replacement bell was known as the "Bell of Banzai for Absolute Peace", and was the model for the United Nations Peace Bell, the first bell donated by the WPBA.

The bells are made using melted-down coinage donated from countries around the world. They have been placed in sixteen countries to date, with the US and Japan having more than one bell.

The current president of the association is Tomijiro Yoshida. Yoshida officially founded the WPBA in 1982, ten years after Chiyoji Nakagawa's death, to continue Nakagawa's work.
