= Geert van Wou =

Geert van Wou (1440, Hintham—December 1527, Kampen) was a well-known Dutch bellfounder. He is best known today for the Maria Gloriosa (1497) of Erfurt Cathedral. The son of a bellfounder, he is considered one of the most important bellfounders of the Middle Ages, though records suggest he participated in other casting.

The most famous bells for the cathedrals include those in Erfurt (Maria Gloriosa, e^{0}, 1497), Braunschweig (1502), Naumburg (1502), Utrecht (7 bells on F^{0}, 1505/06), and the St. Michael's Church in Kampen (1493/96) and that of today's new tower in Kampen (1481–83). A Van Wou bell also hangs in Zeerijp (1500) and another there by him was recast in 1955 by van Bergen because of a crack in the bell foundry. He cast two other bells (of 1493) hanging in the Lamberti Church in Munster. In Eernewoude also a Van Wou-bell from the year 1500. For St. Michaelis and St. Nicolai in Lüneburg he also poured bells (two in St. Michaelis, one in St. Nicolai, 1491) and for St. Mary in Stendal and the St. Mary's Cathedral in Hamburg (1487, the bell "Celsa", which since 1804 is now in the St. Nicholas Church (Hamburg- Altengamme depends)). Another bell hangs in the minster Mildam roads in the church of St. Gudula. Cast in 1492, the Regina Bell of Osnabrück Cathedral, already cast in 1485, is now in the tower of Holy Cross Church at Osnabrück. The Grote Kerk, Haarlem in Haarlem houses another van Wou bell, the Roelant cast in 1503, weighing in at almost 5000 kg.

He was the father of Wilhelm II, Jasper, Johannes II (died 1553), and Geert II and the grandfather of Gert Cantor.
