= Maria Gloriosa =

Well-known bell of Erfurt Cathedral

Coordinates: 50.9758°N 11.0234°E

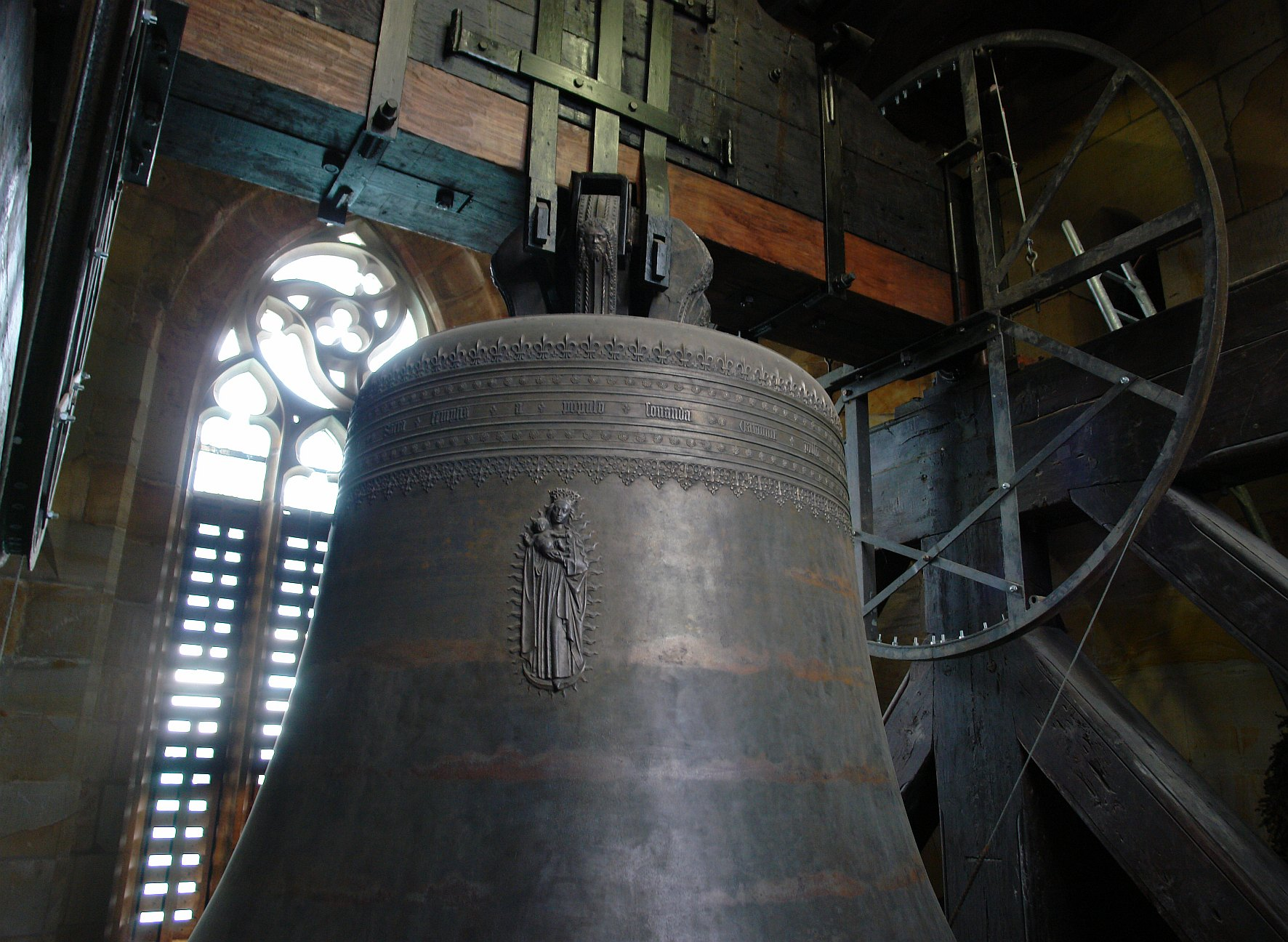
Maria Gloriosa

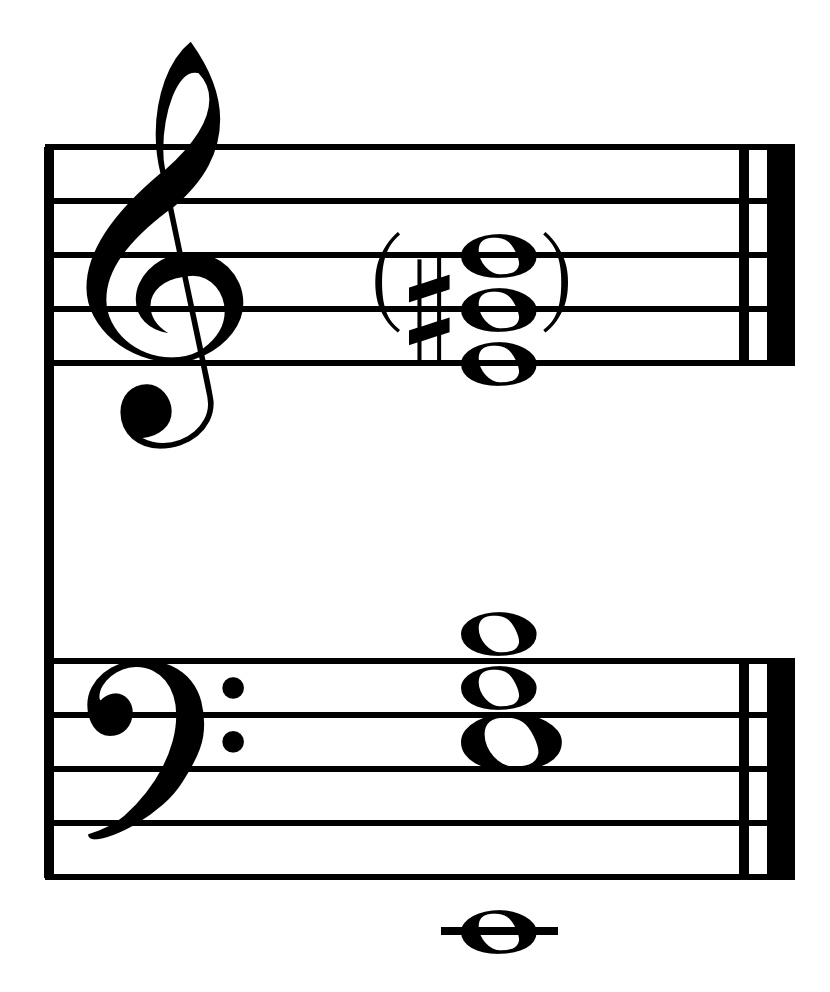
The Erfurt bell (1497) or any well-tuned bell: strike note on E, with hum note an octave below, minor third, fifth, octave or nominal, and major third and perfect fifth in the second octave.

Maria Gloriosa (simply known as Gloriosa), or the Erfurt Bell, is the bourdon bell of Erfurt Cathedral, cast by Geert van Wou in 1497. The world's largest medieval free-swinging bell, it is now swung electrically. It was welded in 1985 to repair a crack, then, in August 2004, the bell was re-fused due to another crack from 2001.

Diameter: 8 feet 5 3/4 inches [2,584 mm] (257cm), weight: 13 tons 15 cwts. [12555 kg], note: E [1497 standard]. Alternately: 2570mm, 11450 kg, note by today's standards: F−. It is about 2 meters tall.

As with any well-tuned bell the hum tone is near an octave below the strike tone, and all other notes are in tune including the minor third, fifth, octave, and major third and fifth in the second octave that may be heard in large bells.

Related Section:

Cologne Bell, also known as the great bell of Cologne Cathedral, is the second largest freely swinging bell. It was cast using metal from French guns.
