= Erfurt latrine disaster =

12th-century accident in the Holy Roman Empire

- Native name: Erfurter Latrinensturz
- Date: 26 July 1184
- Venue: Erfurt Cathedral
- Location: Erfurt, Mainz Electorate, Holy Roman Empire
- Cause: Floor collapse due to excessive load
- Deaths: ~60

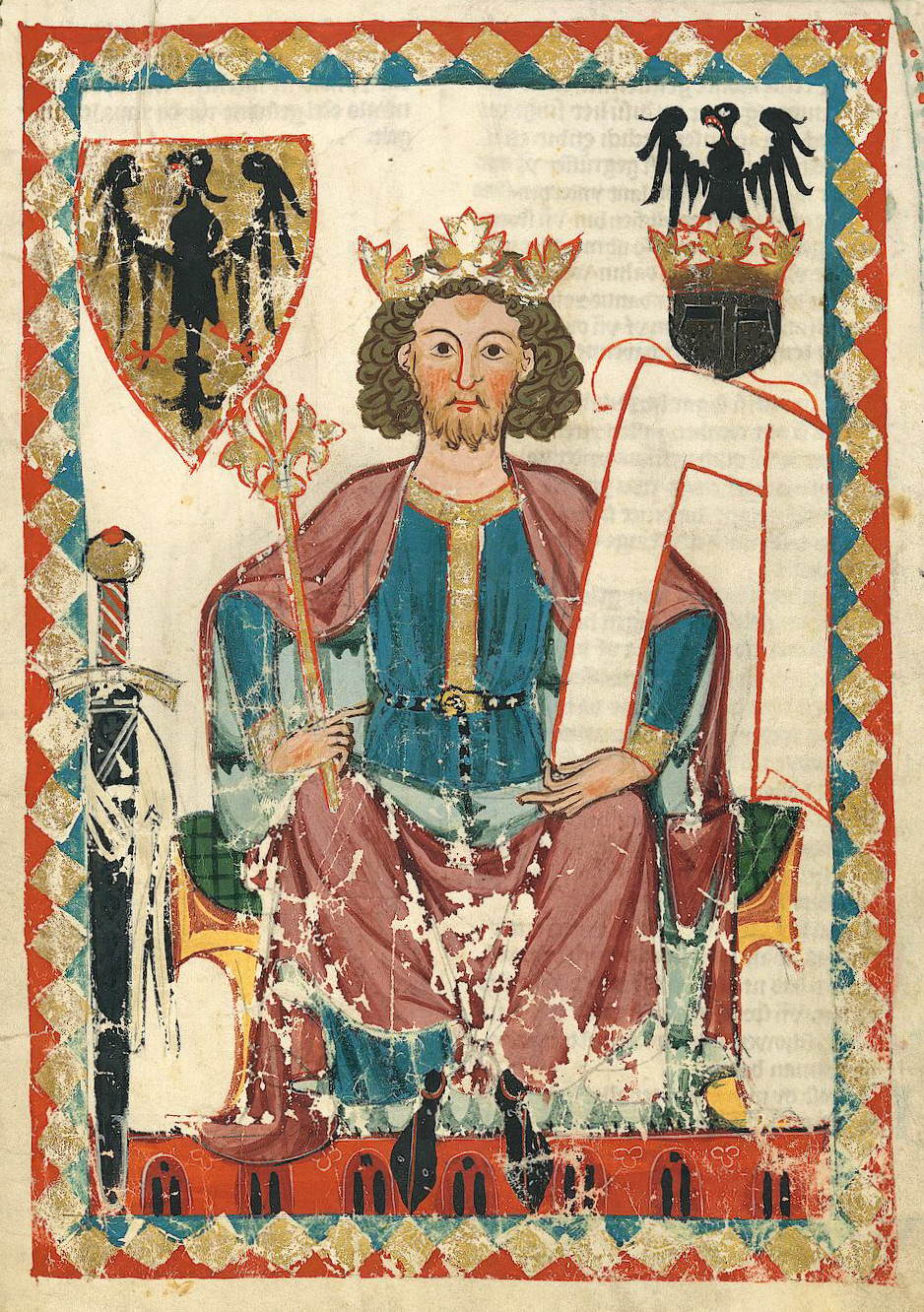
King (later Emperor) Henry VI (depiction from the Codex Manesse) was present at the Erfurt latrine disaster and survived unharmed.

On 26 July 1184, in the German city of Erfurt, approximately sixty local nobles died when the floor of a building collapsed through the ground floor and into the latrine cesspit below. They were attending a Hoftag ("court day") conducted by King Henry VI when their combined weight caused the floor of the building to collapse. Some of the attendees drowned in human waste after falling into the cesspit.

== Background ==
A land dispute between Landgrave Louis III of Thuringia and Archbishop Conrad of Mainz, which had existed since the defeat of Henry the Lion, intensified to the point where the Holy Roman emperor and his family were forced to intervene. On his father Frederick Barbarossa's orders, eighteen-year-old Henry VI diverted from his military campaign en route to Poland to travel to Erfurt and mediate the situation that was occurring.

== Event ==
Henry VI convened a Hoftag to meet on 25 July, the Feast of Saint James, which was attended by Landgrave Louis, Archbishop Conrad, members of Henry's court, local nobility and bishops, and prominent citizens of Erfurt. Sources agree that the meeting took place on the upper floor of a two-story building close to Erfurt Cathedral, but disagree on whether it was the provost's building or the bishop's residence nearby.

=== Collapse ===
The upper floor's wooden support beams were rotten, and on 26 July, the floor collapsed under the combined weight of the meeting's attendees. The impact of people and debris caused the ground floor to collapse as well; some continued falling through the ground floor into an underground cesspit. About 60 people in total are said to have died of injuries from the fall, being crushed by debris, or suffocating in the cesspit's sewage. The Chronicle of Saint Peter's in Erfurt lists noblemen who perished: Count Friedrich I of Abenberg, Count Heinrich I of Schwarzburg, Count Gozmar III of Ziegenhain, Gozmar's brother-in-law Burgrave Friedrich I of Kirchberg, Count Burchard of Wartburg, Behringer von Wellingen, and "other lesser names" who were not recorded in the chronicle.

Henry VI and Archbishop Conrad were sitting in a stone window alcove and avoided the fall; they hung on until rescuers with ladders were able to arrive and let them down. Landgrave Louis had fallen in the collapse, but survived and was rescued.

=== Aftermath ===
After the disaster, Henry VI immediately departed Erfurt and resumed his military campaign, leaving the dispute between Landgrave Louis and Archbishop Conrad unresolved. Heinrich I of Schwarzburg's estate passed to his brother Günther II. Gozmar III's estate passed to his daughter Liutgard, who would later marry Landgrave Louis's brother Friedrich. Friedrich I of Kirchberg's estate passed to his son Heinrich. Burchard of Wartburg's estate passed to his son Ludwig.

=== Legacy ===
The tale of the Erfurt latrine collapse eventually entered local folklore; Ludwig Bechstein included such a story while compiling his Deutsches Sagenbuch, published in 1853. The retelling focuses on Heinrich of Schwarzburg, who allegedly had a habit of saying "Tue ich das, so müsse ich im Abtritt ersaufen." ("If I did that, I'd have to drown in the privy.") Aptly, he ends up drowning in excrement during the disaster, along with Friedrich of Abenberg. The story differs from the historical record in places: Heinrich I of Schwarzburg is referred to as Heinrich VII, Friedrich of Abenberg is called Friedrich of Arnsberg, Gozmar of Ziegenhain becomes two people (Gozmar of Hesse and Gottfried of Ziegenhain), the Hoftag is called a Reichstag, it takes place at the Benedictine Monastery of Saints Peter and Paul (where an Imperial Diet was held in 1181), and it collapses into a sewer instead of a cesspit.

== See also ==
- Structural failure
  - List of structural failures and collapses
- Toilet-related injuries and deaths
  - List of people who have died while on the toilet

== Original sources ==
- Cronica Reinhardsbrunnensis, MGH. SS XXX/1, p. 541-542. (in Latin)
- Cronica S. Petri Erfordensis moderna, MGH. SS XXX/1, p. 374. (in original Latin)
- Chronik von St. Peter zu Erfurt (German translation)
