= St Severus' Church, Erfurt =

St Severus' Church
- German: Severikirche
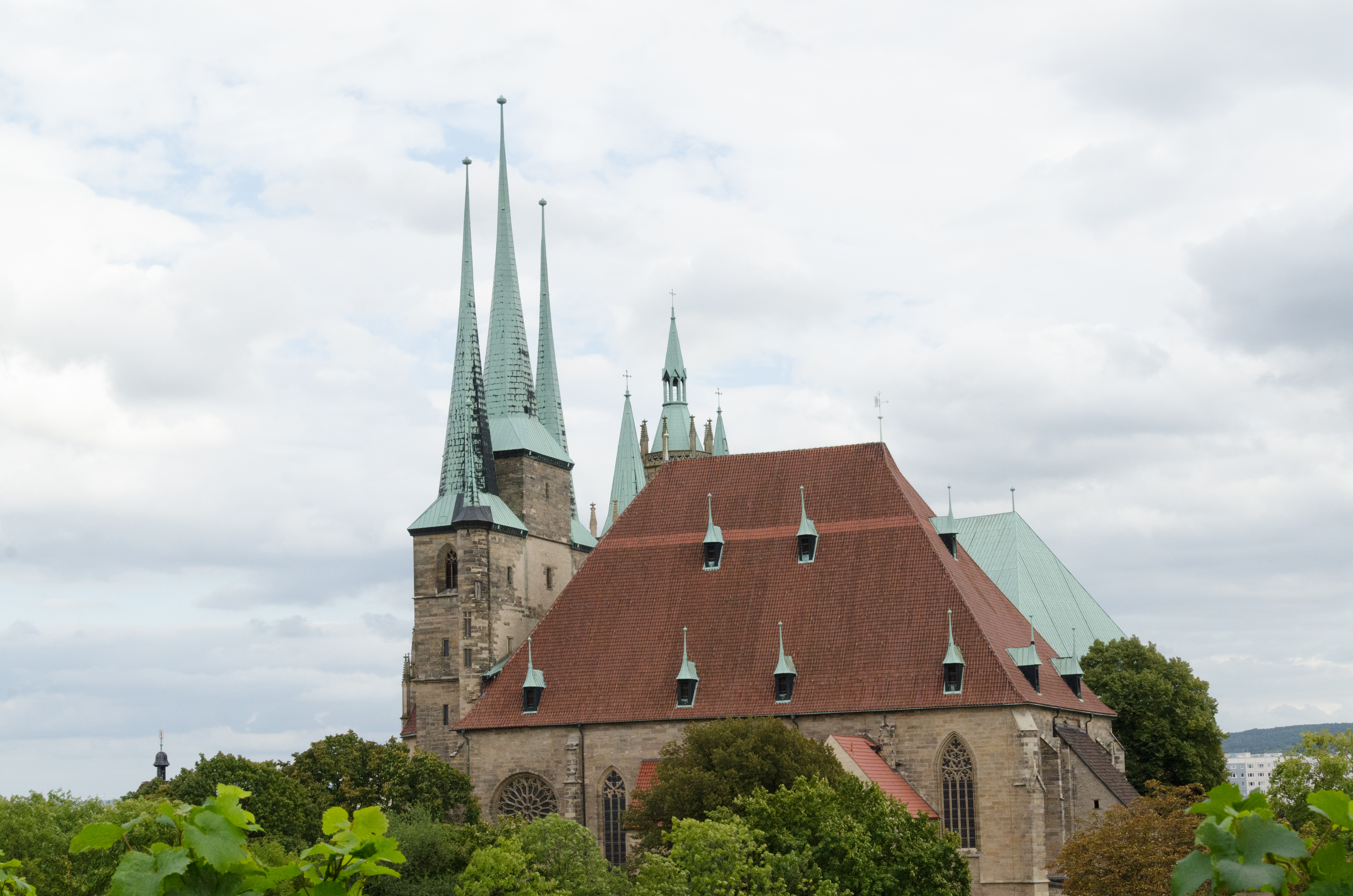
- View from Petersberg

- Location in Germany
- 50.976131°N 11.022561°E
- Location: Erfurt, Thuringia
- Country: Germany
- Denomination: Catholic

History
- Status: Active
- Dedication: Severus of Ravenna

Architecture
- Functional status: Parish church
- Heritage designation: Kulturdenkmal in Thuringia
- Architectural type: Hall church
- Style: Gothic
- Years built: 1270s–mid-14th century Blaise's Chapel: before 1429; Cross Chapel: before 1495
- Groundbreaking: 11th century

St Severus' Church (German: Severikirche) in the city of Erfurt in Thuringia, Germany, is a Roman Catholic church building. It stands on the Domberg (Cathedral Hill) directly next to St Mary's Cathedral. As a unique architectural ensemble, both churches together form the city's landmark. Due to its unusual form, which seems to anticipate the late Gothic hall church, St Severus' Church is one of the most important Gothic buildings in Germany. The bones of the church patron Severus of Ravenna rest in an artistically very significant sarcophagus.

== Building history ==
=== Early Middle Ages ===
An older St Paul's church stood on the site of the present church, but no remains were found during archaeological excavations in 1960–1961 directly north of the church. Thus, it must remain open when and by whom it was founded. In part, its establishment is still attributed to Saint Boniface. In 708, a Benedictine monastery, perhaps even with nuns, is said to have been founded under the name of St Paul. In 836, Archbishop Otgar of Mainz (826–847) had the bones of St Severus of Ravenna transferred to Erfurt to the Benedictine nunnery of St Paul, an altum monasterium. In the 9th century, the church probably had two patron saints: St Paul and St Severus. According to uncertain records, a collegiate church was founded at the monastery in 935.

=== Romanesque building ===
After that, the church of St Severus was not mentioned again until 1079–1080. When Henry IV conquered the city of Erfurt, the churches were set on fire along with the people who had taken refuge in them. Afterwards, the church known as the Hohes Münster ("High Minster") was demolished and rebuilt in a smaller form on the same site.

In 1121, the canonry at St Severus' Church was mentioned in a document for the first time. There was thus a second collegiate church on the Domberg next to St Mary's Cathedral, which had probably also existed for almost 200 years. At the same time, the nunnery continued to exist on the mons Severi, probably using the same church. As a third institution on this site, Archbishop Adalbert of Mainz (1109–1137) had an episcopal residence built before 1123, the Krummhaus ("Crooked House") to the east of St Severus' Church. As space became increasingly scarce, Adalbert moved the Benedictine nunnery of St Paul to the Cyriaksberg in 1123. In 1142, St Severus' Church and monastery, the bishop's castle and St Peter's monastery on the Petersberg were destroyed by fire. The former were then supposedly rebuilt by 1148 or – far more likely – merely repaired. Despite this state, the church was consecrated anew in the same year.

The Romanesque ground plan can still be seen in today's building. It was a three-aisle basilica with two transepts and two choirs; the east choir was flanked by two east towers, as in St Peter's Church and St Mary's Cathedral. The two choirs obviously continued an older tradition, which is also expressed by the double patrocinium.

=== High-Gothic new building ===
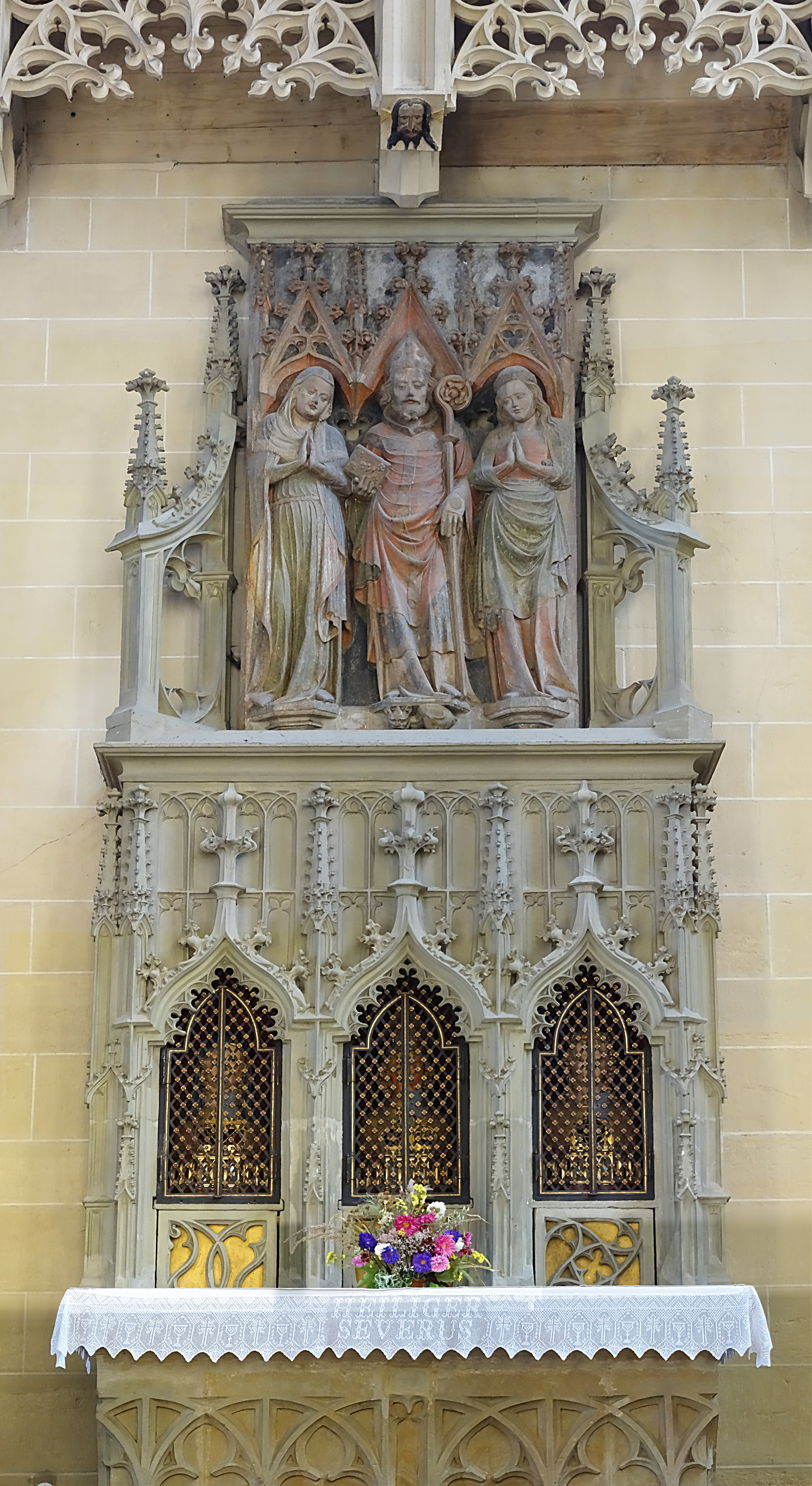
The Severus' altar

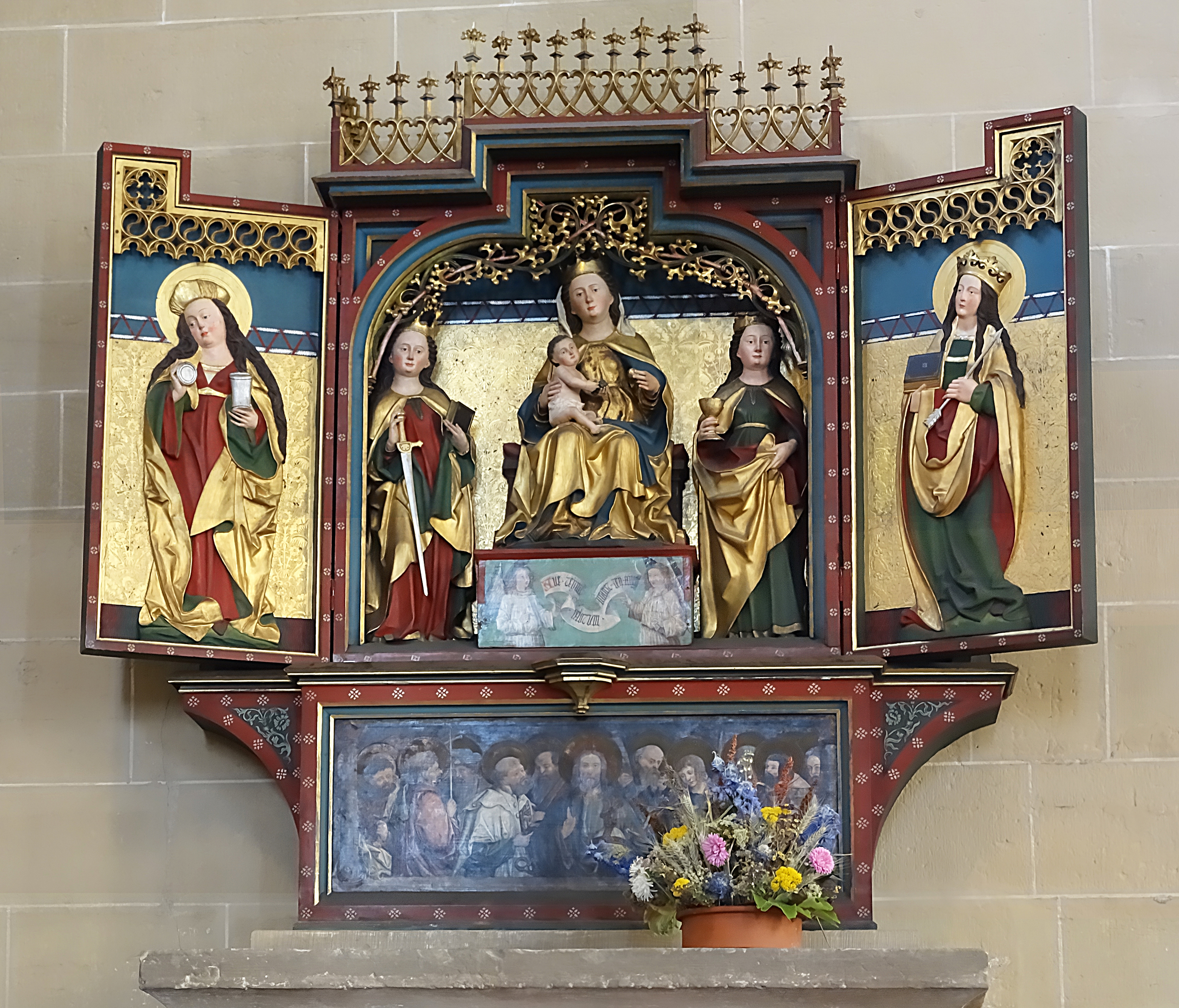
The Lady's altar (1510)

In 1238, a document of indulgence mentioned a plan for a new building, which was not started until the 1270s. The sources describe that the church "threatened to become a ruin" or even collapsed. The documentary evidence for the building is extraordinarily fortunate, as numerous indulgences were granted that report on the progress of construction. These indulgences also indicate that the new building was to be particularly impressive. In 1308, the new high altar was consecrated; at that time, at least the eastern parts, the choir and the eastern transept were completed. In 1327, the nave is said to have been largely completed, and five years later the entire church. Some reports already refer to the first repairs after a lightning strike in 1327, which also killed several people, suggesting that the church was already being used again at that time.

The church was probably not more or less completed until the middle of the 14th century, as a whole series of altars were donated in the 1360s. The large number of donations of altars, vicars and widely known High-Gothic sculptures indicates Erfurt's economic rise at this time. The vaulting was not completed until around 1370. In the 1370s and 1380s, there were several disputes, some of them physical, between the two capitularies over the single-storey, two-bay Blaise's Chapel built on the south side between 1358 and 1363 and the boundary between the two churches, which were not settled amicably until 1387. The chapel, whose buttresses overstepped onto the grounds of St Mary's, was to be rebuilt and the boundary between the two churches was to be marked with boundary stones, also on the chapel, which was done before 1429.

A five-aisled, four-bay nave of almost square shape with two transepts in the east and west was created. The ground plan of the Romanesque building was thus largely retained, and the old foundations were possibly also used. However, a second side aisle was added to the north and south, giving the entire church the width of the transepts, which thus no longer protruded outwards. At first glance, the vaults from around 1370 appear to be the same height, which gives the building a very uniform appearance. Here, on a Romanesque ground plan in High Gothic times, a church building was erected which was extremely unusual for that time and which actually only came into fashion much later with the late-Gothic hall buildings of the 15th century. The two-bay, two-storey Lady's Chapel on the north side was probably created at the same time as the church and the portal porch of the main portal (Mary with Child 1360/70).

=== Late Gothic conversions ===
A major break in the history and building history of the church was the devastating city fire of 19 June 1472, in which St Severus' was also badly affected. The bell towers, bells, organs, the entire roofing, the west choir with cloister and parts of the vaults were damaged or destroyed. By around 1500, the fire damage had been repaired and some new buildings such as the sacristy and capitular hall were erected. The huge hipped roof covering the entire nave (1472–1473) and the present shape of the eastern end with its three-steeple group date from this period.

The choir side towers, square in plan, originally date from the High Gothic period, but they were destroyed except for the lower storeys and then rebuilt, taking on their present form with slender spires in 1495. The raised central tower with the bell storey was probably also added at this time, and the pointed spire is dated 1494. The west choir was demolished together with the connections for the cloister, and a two-storey extension with a Cross chapel was built in its place by 1495.

The late Gothic Virgin Mary altar (1510) in the northern side aisle is attributed to the Saalfeld School. In the shrine, the cupboard-like centrepiece, the enthroned Mother of God Mary is flanked by the standing figures of St Barbara (with chalice) and St Catherine (with sword). The figures of saints on the side wings are carved in flat relief and show St Ursula (with arrow and book) and Mary Magdalene (with ointment jar). When the side wings are closed, the Annunciation of the Nativity by the Archangel Gabriel can be seen.

=== Cloister structures ===
Published documents mention a cloister twice, in 1317 and 1363, but today it is usually assumed that the Gothic Severus' Church never had a fully developed cloister. There would have been space for it only on the north side, but no traces can be found there, and there is no evidence of the demolition of a cloister or an enclosure. A room in the church itself probably served as the capitular hall (locus capitularis). In 1386, the capitularies demonstrably met there, and in the following year, the location is even described as a room in the east bays of the north aisles directly west of the north transept. The canons entered for services and capitular meetings through the main portal on the north side, while today's main entrance in the south served as the lay portal.

After the fire of 1472, an ambitus was built on the west side of the church and in front of the southwest corner, perhaps only restoring an older state without profound changes. In 1485, a new sacristy (demolished in 1818) and a capitular hall were built on the north side of the church, and ten years later a new cloister was completed.

=== Church and monastery in modern times ===
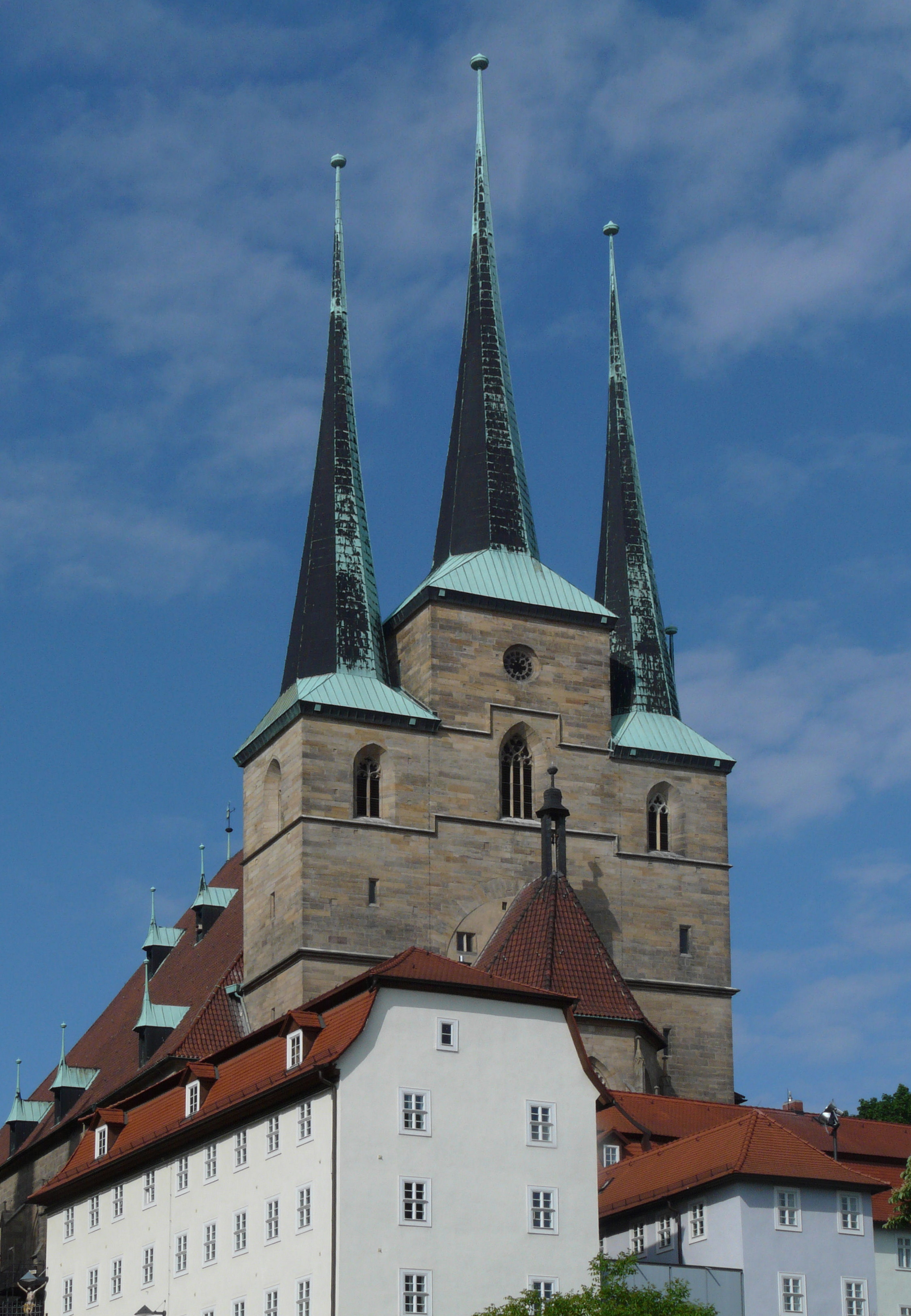
View from Domplatz

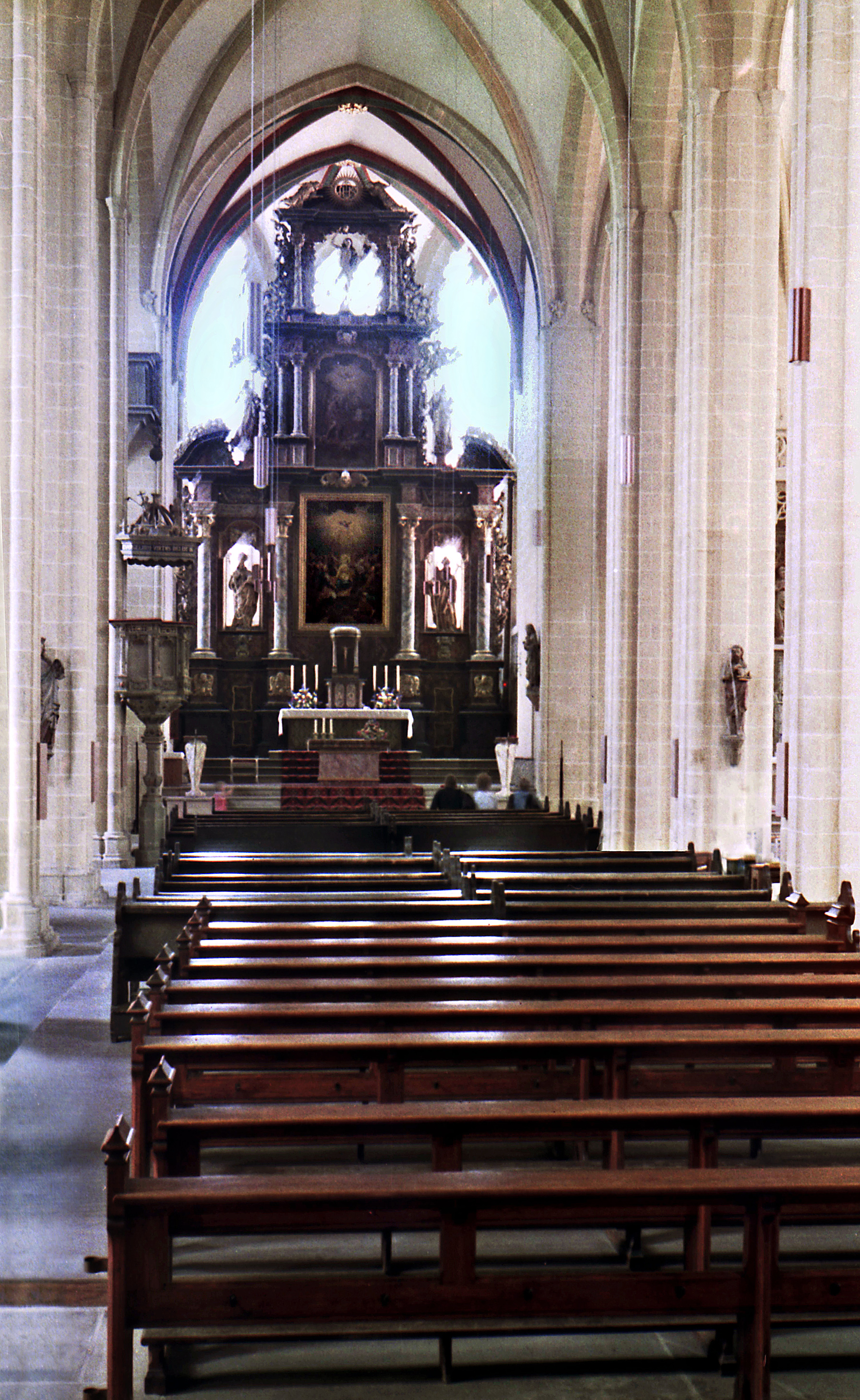
Interior view

From 1582 to 1584, Valentin Leucht (1550–1619), book author, later imperial court palatine and book commissioner, worked here as pastor.

In 1633, St Severus' Church was occupied by Swedish troops and subsequently handed over to the Protestants, who altered the interior by demolishing an altar and relocating the pulpit. As early as 1635, however, the church was returned to the Catholics and the changes were reversed. In the 1670s, the church received a new Baroque high altar.

Like St Mary's Monastery, Severus' Monastery was abolished in the course of secularisation in 1803. In 1813–1814, the church was temporarily used by the French occupation as a military hospital, especially because of the rampant "nervous fever" (typhoid fever and typhus). During the siege of Erfurt, the many dead were disposed of in neighbouring cellars and underground passages. In 1811, at the time of Napoleon's "Imperial Domain" of Erfurt, the church was advertised for sale for demolition in the Erfurt Intelligence Gazette at the instigation of Napoleon. No buyer was found, so the church was preserved.

In 1834, restoration work began on the Lady's Chapel, and in 1845 on the entire church. The paintings from this period were removed again in 1928–1929.

During the Second World War, the church was severely damaged by the air raids on Erfurt in 1944–1945, mainly by the blast waves of air mines, but also by shelling in April 1945. The covering of all the roofs was completely destroyed, all the stained glass windows were destroyed and the tracery and ribs of the windows were severely damaged in some cases. The Boniface's Chapel and the residential buildings adjacent to the church also suffered damage.

In the 1970s and early 1980s, the roof was renovated again and the interior completely restored, followed by the restoration of the south-western cloister from 1993 to 1995.

=== Significance history ===
The Severus' monastery dates back to a church called St Paul from the 8th to 9th century. The relics that came to Erfurt in 836 under Archbishop Otgar of Mainz were of such great significance that the monastery was renamed "St. Severi". From the time thereafter, it is known that a legally independent canonry already existed before 1080. St Severus' was one of the oldest churches and clerical communities in the 11th to 12th century. However, it was not the most important, but always stood behind St Mary's (in witness lists of documents it was always listed after "St. Marien"). Nevertheless, not only St Mary's formed an administrative unit, but St Severus' was also designated as an archdeaconry. Particularly noteworthy for the status of St Severus' are the administrative functions that fell to it via the archbishop's landholdings. Thus, the monastery was a kind of Fronhof for the diocese. The St Severus' monastery owned land in countless surrounding villages. A letter of protection from 1335 from Emperor Ludwig the Bavarian confirms all the properties. In a privilege from 1348 by Emperor Charles IV, these are also confirmed to the monastery. These estates were located, among others, in the districts of Erfurt, Weissensee, and Eckartsberga, the Grand Duchy of Weimar, the Grand Duchy of Gotha, the Duchy of Saxony-Meiningen and the Principality of Schwarzburg.

The supposed nunnery is based on a confusion with the Altmünster nunnery in Mainz. In fact, there was a nunnery on the Cyriaxberg before the Krummhaus was built in 1123; this had to be moved to the southwest of Erfurt. Later mentions of a nunnery can therefore not be linked to the Severus' monastery.

== Interior ==
=== Organ ===
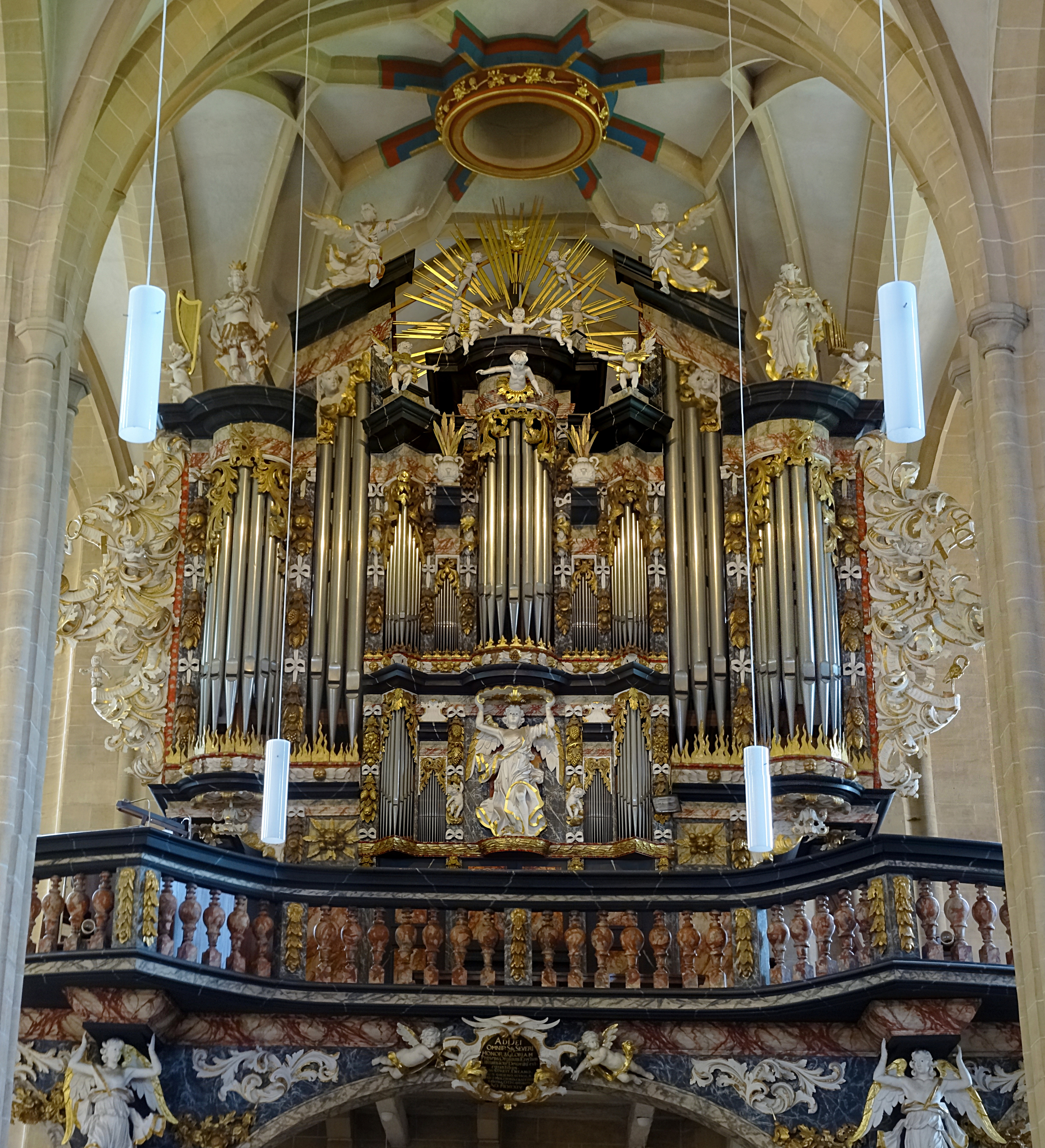
The Klais organ (1930)

The present organ of St Severus' Church was built in 1930 by Johannes Klais from Bonn in the Baroque case of the Wender organ from 1714. The instrument has cone chests and electropneumatic key and stop actions.

I Main division C–g^{3}
1	Nachthorn-Gedackt	16′
2	Principal	8′
3	Rohrflöte	8′
4	Salicional	8′
5	Prästant	4′
6	Zartflöte	4′
7	Quinte	2 2/3′
8	Blockflöte	2′
9	Mixtur IV
10	Trompete	8′

II Positive C–g^{3}
11	Holzflöte	8′
12	Quintadena	8′
13	Singend Principal	4′
14	Schwiegel	2′
15	Terz	1 3/5′
16	Nassat	1 1/3′
17	Cymbel III–IV
18	Krummhorn	8′

III Swell division C–g^{3}
19	Geigenprincipal	8′
20	Gemshorn	8′
21	Oktave	4′
22	Querflöte	4′
23	Waldflöte	2′
24	Nachthorn	1′
25	Progressiv III–IV
26	Trompette harmonique	8′
	Tremulant

Pedal C–f^{1}
27	Principalbaß (c^{1}–f^{1} of No. 29)	16′
28	Subbaß (= No. 1)	16′
29	Oktave	8′
30	Bassflöte (= No. 3)	8′
31	Choralbaß (C–f^{0} of No. 29)	4′
32	Flachflöte (C–f^{0} of No. 29)	2′
33	Bombarde (c^{1}–f^{1} of No. 10)	16′

- Couplers:
  - Normal couplers: II/I, III/I, III/II, I/P, II/P, III/P
  - Sub-octave couplers: II/I, III/I, III/III, III/P
  - Super-oktave couplers: III/I, III/II, III/III
- Playing aids: two free combinations, crescendo pedal.

=== Bells ===
A large peal of bells, some of them historical, hangs in the towers. The sonorous Osanna from 1474 is the largest in the ringing and is decorated with historically significant bell carvings. The Vincentia was cast by Gerhard van Wou. The Old Martha was restored in 1987. The New Martha bears a bell carving by Horst Jährling depicting Christopherus.

==== Main bells ====
No.	Name	Cast in	Cast by	Strike tone (Note + 1/16)	Diameter	Mass	Tower
1	Osanna	1474	Claus von Mühlhausen	a♯^{0} + 7	1.84 m (6 ft 0 in)	c. 4.5 t (4.4 LT)	Central
2	Vincentia	1497	Gerhard van Wou	b^{0} + 9	1.63 m (5 ft 4 in)	c. 3 t (3.0 LT)	South
3	Old Martha	1475	Claus von Mühlhausen	d♯^{1} + 6			Central
4	New Martha	1961	Franz Schilling, Apolda	f♯^{1} + 13	1.06 m (3 ft 6 in)		North
5	Anna	1987	Karlsruher Glocken- und Kunstgießerei	g♯^{1}			North

==== "Silver bells" ====
The three smallest bells are called silver bells and do not count as part of the main ringing:

No.	Name	Cast in	Cast by	Strike tone	Tower
6	Christkönig ("Christ King")	1962	Franz Schilling, Apolda	d^{2}	North
7	Maria	1962	Franz Schilling, Apolda	e^{2}	North
8	Michael	1962	Franz Schilling, Apolda	f♯^{2}	North

=== Severus' Sarcophagus ===
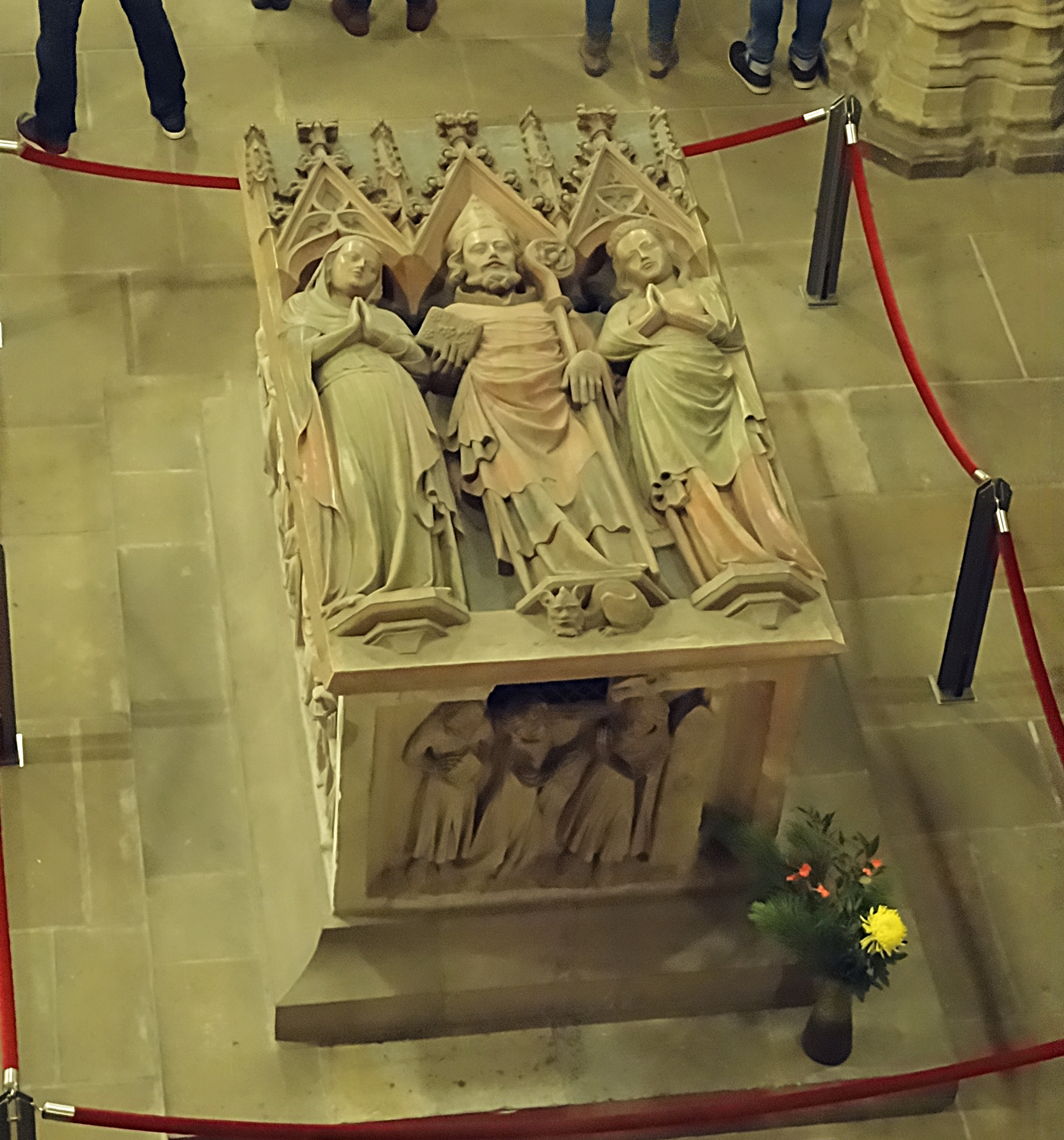
Severus' Sarcophagus

In 836, the bones of St Severus were transferred by the Archbishop of Mainz, Otger of Ravenna, first to Mainz, then to Erfurt. Here they had presumably been buried and venerated in the western part of a predecessor building of the church. When the church was rebuilt, it became necessary to redesign the tomb, which continued to be placed in a central position, presumably near the west choir. In the fire of 1472, the west choir was severely destroyed, after which the tomb was dismantled and the side slabs placed elsewhere. The original cover plate was used after 1472 as a top for the Severus altar in the south transept arm. It was not until 1948 that the parts were reassembled and erected at this location, and in 1982 a cast of the cover plate was added.

The sarcophagus is one of the most artistically significant pieces of interior decoration in the Church of St Severus. The four relief panels on the surrounding walls were created between about 1360 and 1370 and are attributed to a master of the Severus' sarcophagus. The almost fully sculptural high reliefs depict scenes from the life and work of Saint Severus and the Adoration of the Three Magi, based on a model in Nuremberg's Church of St Lawrence from 1360. It has also been assumed that the individual parts were only united to form a tumba some time after their creation and had previously stood individually or in a different context, perhaps as parts of a rood screen with ambo, in the church interior.

== Boniface's Chapel ==
The Catholic Boniface's Chapel is a square tower, still Romanesque in parts, which may originally have belonged to the archbishop's castle. It was possibly converted into a chapel as early as the 14th century when the tracery window on the west side was inserted. The hipped roof with ridge turret dates from the 17th century.

== Sources ==
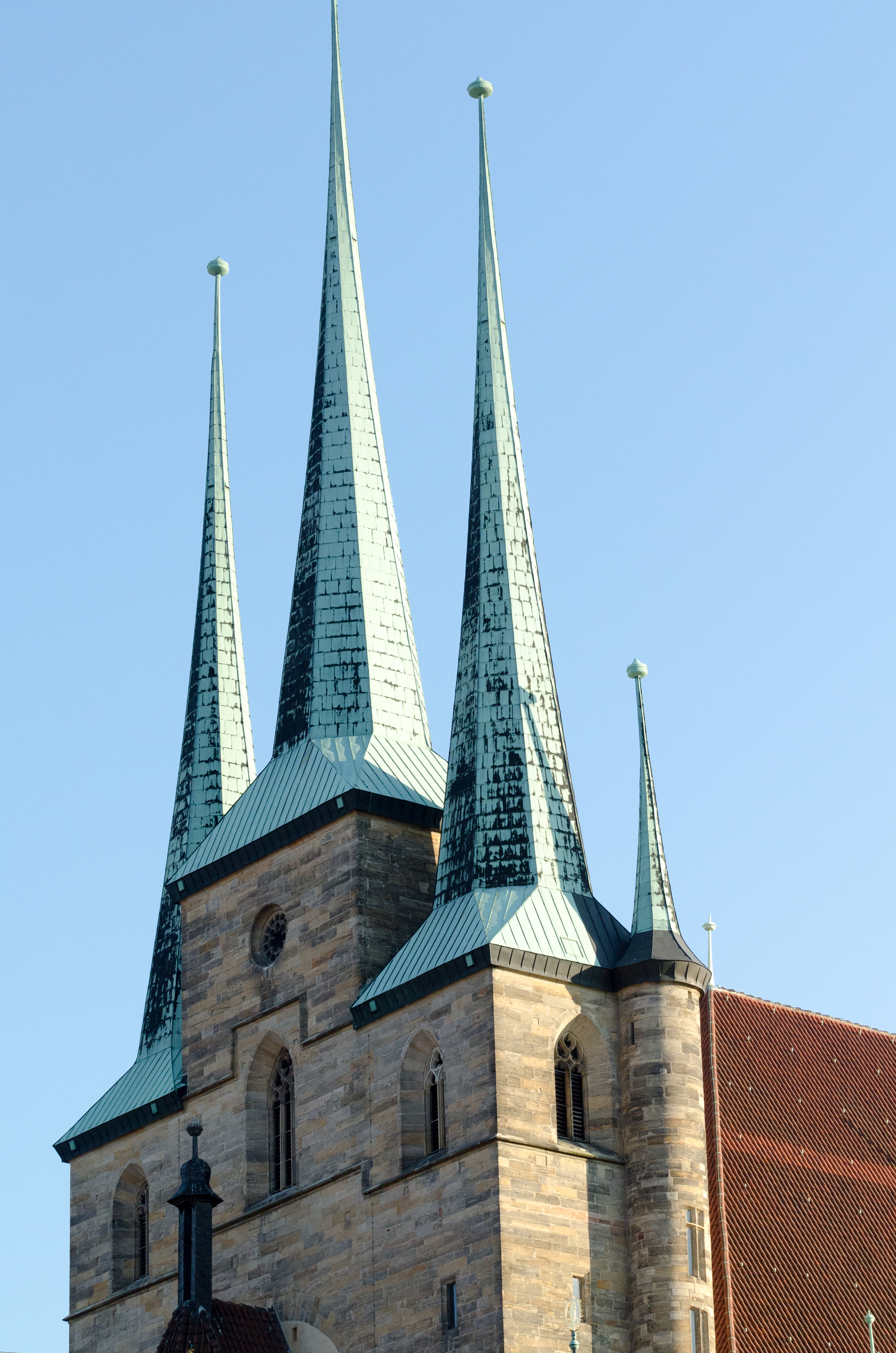
The three-spire group

- Becker, Karl (1929). Die Stadt Erfurt, Dom. Severikirche. Peterskloster. Zitadelle (in German). Burg: Hopfer.
- Brückner, Margarethe; Haetge, Ernst; Schürenberg, Lisa; Overmann, Alfred (1929). Die Severikirche (in German). Burg.
- Buchner, Otto (1903). "Der Severi-Sarkophag zu Erfurt und sein Künstler samt Übersetzung der Vita und Translatio Sancti Severi des Priesters Liutolf". Mitteilungen des Vereins für die Geschichte und Altertumskunde von Erfurt (in German). 24. Erfurt: 137–157.
- Gockel, Michael (2000). Die deutschen Königspfalzen. Repertorium der Pfalzen, Königshöfe und übrigen Aufenthaltsorte der Könige im deutschen Reich des Mittelalters (in German). Vol. 2: Thüringen. Göttingen: Vandenhoeck & Ruprecht. pp. 102–148. ISBN 3-525-36505-5.
- Hanftmann, Bartel (1913). Zur Baugeschichte der Stiftskirche Beatae Mariae Virginis (Dom) und der Severi-Stiftskirche in Erfurt. Jahrbücher der Königlichen Akademie gemeinnütziger Wissenschaften zu Erfurt (in German). Erfurt.
- Lehmann, Edgar; Schubert, Ernst (1988). Dom und Severikirche zu Erfurt (in German) (1st ed.). Leipzig: Koehler & Amelang. ISBN 3-7338-0041-9.
- Lucke, Rolf-Günther; Forberg, Hans-Heinrich (1997). Die Severikirche zu Erfurt. Schnell Kunstführer (in German). Regensburg: Schnell und Steiner. ISBN 3-7954-5798-X.
- Mertens, Claus (1979). Die Severi-Kirche zu Erfurt. Das christliche Denkmal (in German). Vol. 27 (7th ed.). Berlin: Union-Verlag.
- Overmann, Alfred (1926–1934). Urkundenbuch der Erfurter Stifter und Klöster (in German). Magdeburg: Regesten. Nr. 258, Nr. 447.
- Passarge, Walter (1936). Roselius, Ludwig (ed.). Dom und Severikirche zu Erfurt (in German). Vol. II. Bremen/Berlin: Angelsachsen-Verlag.
- Schilling, Franz Peter (1968). "Erfurter Glocken. Die Glocken des Domes, der Severikirche und des Petersklosters zu Erfurt". Das Christliche Denkmal (in German) (Heft 72/73). Berlin: Union-Verlag.
- Stuhr, Michael (1978). Legner, Anton (ed.). Severisarkophag (in German). Vol. 2. Köln: Schnütgen-Museum. p. 564.
- von Tettau, Wilhelm (1887). "Geschichtliche Darstellung des Gebietes der Stadt Erfurt und der Besitzungen der dortigen Stiftungen". Mitteilungen des Vereins für die Geschichte und Altertumskunde von Erfurt (in German). 13. Erfurt: 154–165.
- Wäß, Helga (2006). Form und Wahrnehmung mitteldeutscher Gedächtnisskulptur im 14. Jahrhundert (in German). Vol. 2: Katalog ausgewählter Objekte vom Hohen Mittelalter bis zum Anfang des 15. Jahrhunderts. Bristol: Tenea. Katalog-Nrn. 255, 256 on pp. 285–291. ISBN 3-86504-159-0.
- Werner, Matthias (1973). Die Gründungstradition des Erfurter Petersklosters (in German). Sigmaringen: Jan Thorbecke. pp. 105–113.
