= Agnes of Swabia =

Agnes of Swabia may refer to:

- Agnes of Waiblingen (died 1143), daughter of Emperor Henry IV, by marriage duchess of Swabia and margravine of Austria
- Agnes of Hohenstaufen (died 1184), daughter of Emperor Frederick I, fiancée of Prince Emeric of Hungary

== See also ==
- Agnes of Hohenstaufen
