= Severus of Ravenna =

Christian saint and bishop

Saint Severus of Ravenna
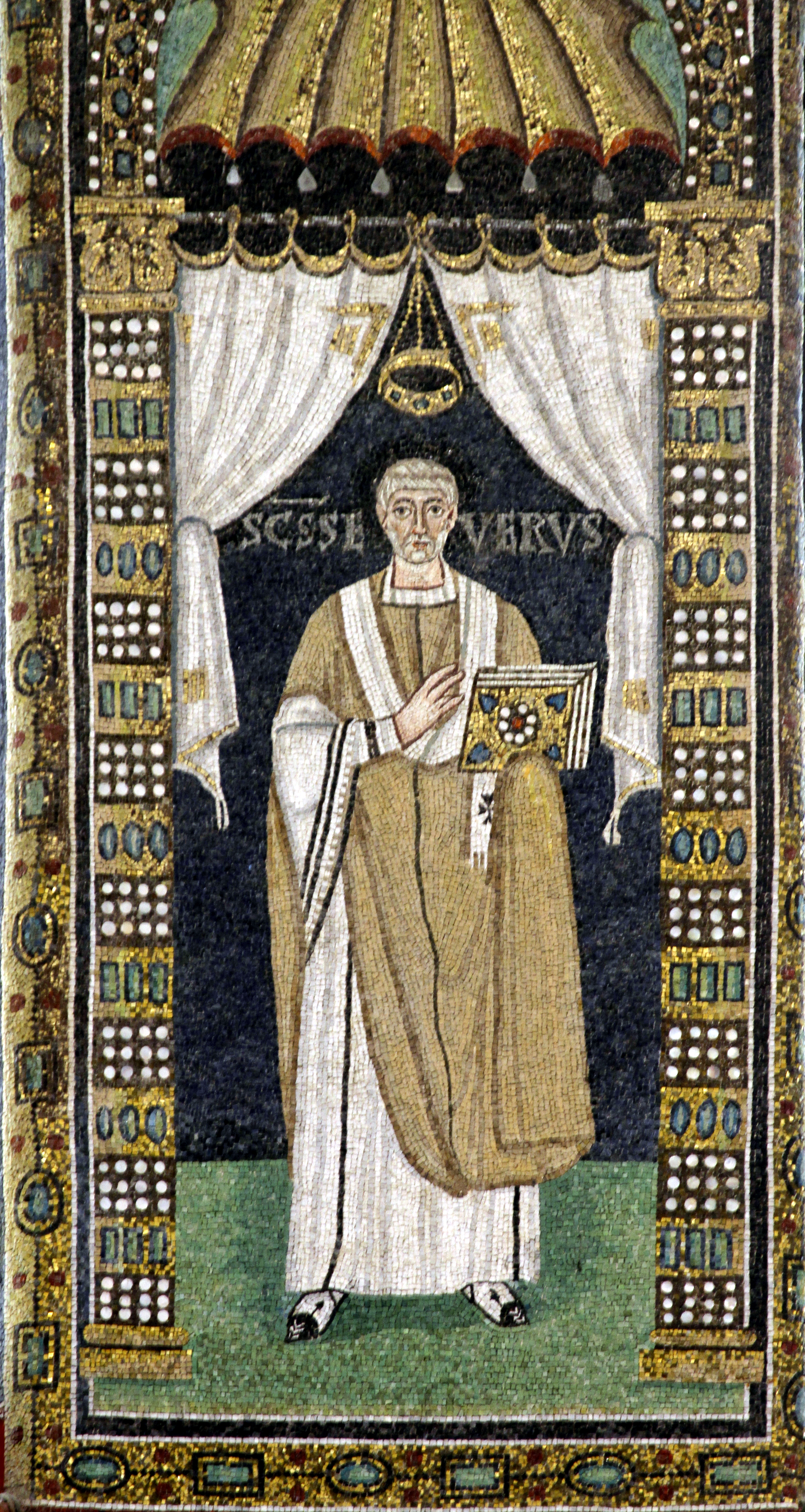
- St. Severus of Ravenna - mosaic in Sant'Apollinare in Classe

Bishop of Ravenna
- Born: Ravenna, Roman Empire
- Died: circa 348
- Venerated in: Catholic Church; Orthodox Church
- Canonized: Pre-Congregation
- Major shrine: Pavio/Pavia (original); Erfurt, Germany
- Feast: 1 February
- Attributes: Loom, weaver's tools, dove
- Patronage: Hatters, wool weavers, spinners, policemen, cloth, stocking, and glove makers.

Saint Severus of Ravenna was a 4th-century Bishop of Ravenna who attended the Council of Sardica in 343. He was ordained as a bishop due to his personal virtue and because of "the sign of a dove". He is commemorated on February 1.

== Life ==
According to legend, Severus, a wool weaver, went with his wife, Vincentia, to observe the election of a successor to Bishop Agapitus for Ravenna. When he arrived at the church a white dove landed three times on his shoulders, so the people took this as a sign and elected him. When he became bishop, his wife and daughter, Innocentia, took the veil.

He attended the Council of Sardica in 343.

He was buried in Classe near Ravenna.

== Veneration ==
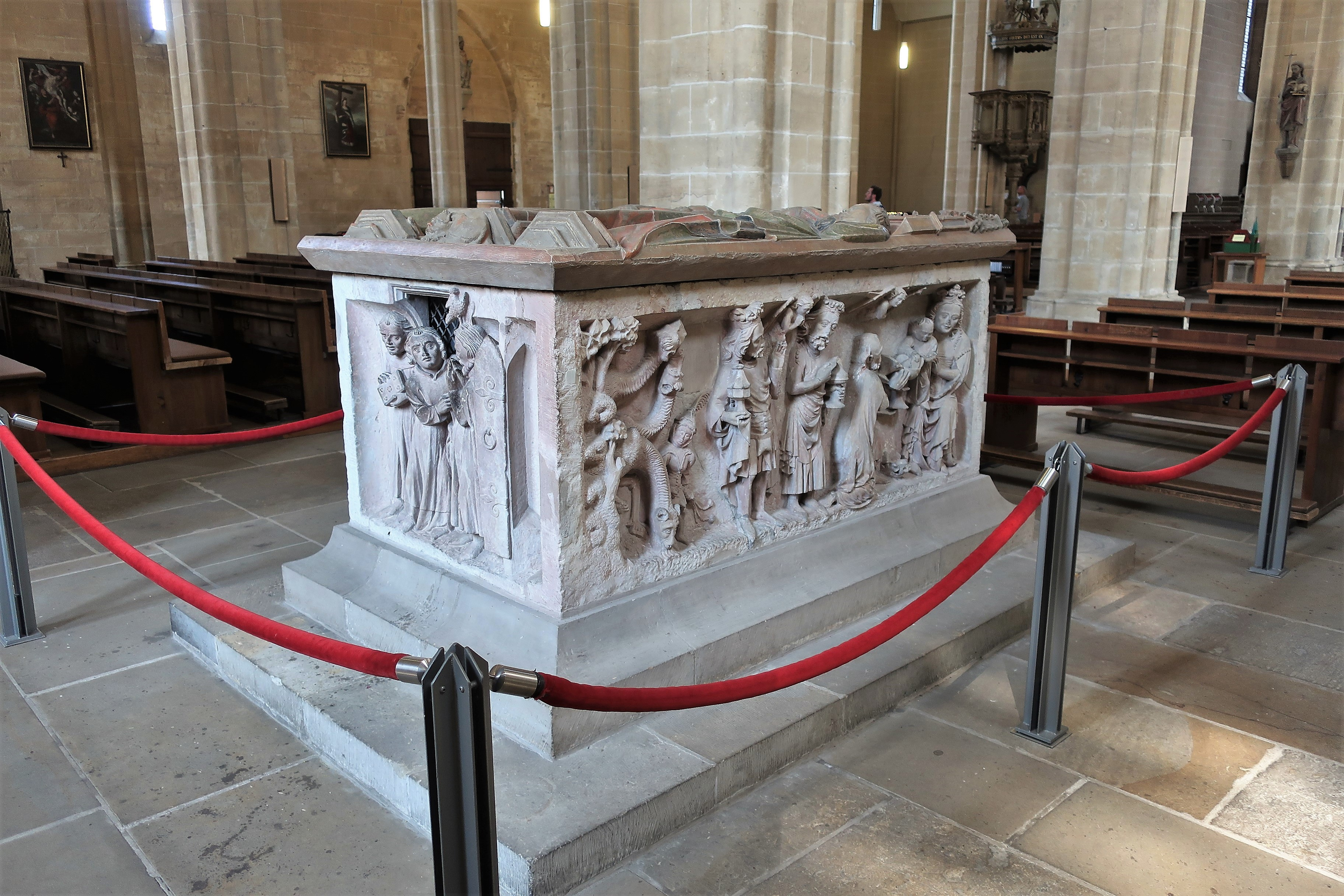
Sarcophagus of St. Severus, St Severus' Church, Erfurt

He was purported to be an example of not only a married priest, but a married archbishop.

Andreas Agnellus, in his Liber Pontificalis Ecclesiae Ravennatis, mentions the founding of a church dedicated to Severus at Classe and the later translation of his relics from a nearby monasterium dedicated to Rophilius, which appears to have taken place around the year 500.

On the feast of Pentecost 582, Archbishop John II "Romanus" consecrated the Basilica of San Severo in Ravenna-Classe at his burial place and in his honor; it was destroyed in 1820 (and excavated from 1964 to 1967).

A Gallic priest named Felix stole Severus's bones together with those of his wife Vincentia and daughter Innocentia and brought them to Pavia. In 836 Bishop Otgar of Mainz acquired the relics and transferred them to first to Mainz, Germany, and eventually to a predecessor building of St Severus' Church, Erfurt, where they were buried and still lie today. Severus is depicted in Justinian's mosaics in Saint Apollinaire in Classis, and his name is recorded in early martyrologies.

There is a Saint Severus Parish Church in Boppard, Germany.

A different St. Severus was martyred in Ravenna during the reign of Maximian, and some early records confused him with the bishop.
