= Christopher Shale =

British businessman and politician

- Born: Christopher Michael Henry Shale; 23 August 1954; Northampton, Northamptonshire, England
- Died: 25 June 2011 (aged 56); Pilton, Somerset, England
- Education: Oakham School
- Occupation: Businessman
- Political party: Conservative
- Spouse: Nicola Mapelli-Mozzi (née Burrows)
- Children: 1

Christopher Michael Henry Shale MBE (23 August 1954 – 25 June 2011) was a British businessman and Conservative politician. He was chairman of the West Oxfordshire Conservative Association, and a close associate of Prime Minister and local MP David Cameron, who praised him for his "massive contribution to the Conservative Party, both locally and nationally".

== Early life ==
Shale was educated at Great Houghton Preparatory School and Oakham School in Rutland, he was then commissioned as a British Army officer in the 17th/21st Lancers.

== Career ==
After leaving the army he joined Durdon Smith Communications and then became the chief executive of SGL Communications. In 1990 he then became the founder and managing director of Oxford Resources, a business supply consultancy. Shale was also a director of the Centre for Policy Studies between 2001 and 2005 and a sponsor of the eurosceptic thinktank Open Europe.

In June 2011 he was critical of the British Conservative Party in a strategy document that was leaked to the Mail on Sunday newspaper, saying that they came across as "graceless, voracious, crass, always on the take".

== Personal life ==
Shale lived in Over Worton, a village near Chipping Norton in Oxfordshire with his wife, Nicola "Nikki" (née Burrows). The couple had a son, Alby Shale, and he was stepfather to Nicola's two children from her first marriage to Alex Mapelli-Mozzi, Natalia Yeomans and Edoardo Mapelli Mozzi, who in 2020 married Princess Beatrice.

Shale died of a heart attack whilst using a portable toilet cubicle at the Glastonbury Festival. Prior to the discovery of his body, he had been reported missing for 18 hours.

== See also ==
- List of people who died on the toilet
- Toilet-related injuries and deaths
