= Erfurt Cathedral =

- Cathedral Church of St Mary at Erfurt
- Erfurter Dom; Hohe Domkirche St. Marien zu Erfurt; Propsteikirche Beatae Mariae Virginis
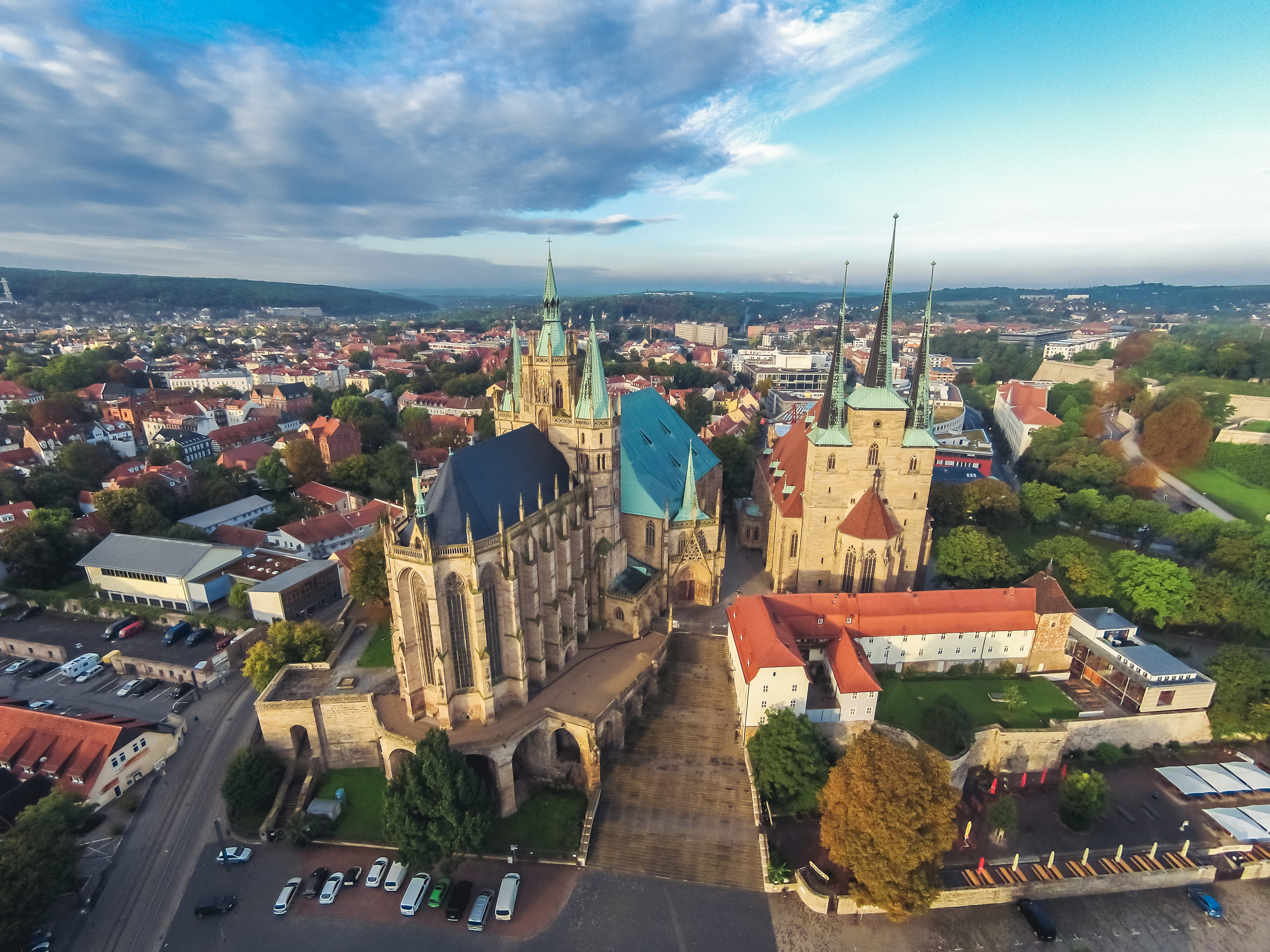
- Erfurt Cathedral (left) and St Severus's Church (right)
- Erfurt Cathedral
- 50°58′33″N 11°01′24″E
- Location: Erfurt, Thuringia
- Country: Germany
- Denomination: Roman Catholic
- Website: www.dom-erfurt.de

History
- Status: Cathedral
- Dedication: St Mary

Architecture
- Functional status: Active
- Heritage designation: Kulturdenkmal in Thuringia
- Style: Gothic
- Groundbreaking: 12th century
- Completed: 15th century

Specifications
- Height: 81.26 m (266 ft 7 in)

Administration
- Diocese: Diocese of Erfurt

Clergy
- Vicar: Bernhard Drapatz

Erfurt Cathedral (German: Erfurter Dom, officially Hohe Domkirche St. Marien zu Erfurt, English: Cathedral Church of St Mary at Erfurt), also known as St Mary's Cathedral, is the largest and oldest church building in the Thuringian city of Erfurt, central Germany. It is the episcopal seat of the Roman Catholic Diocese of Erfurt. The cathedral was mainly built in the International Gothic style and is located on a hillside overlooking the main town square (Domplatz, Cathedral Square), directly next to St Severus' Church. As a unique architectural ensemble, both churches together form the city's landmark. Former German names include Marienkirche and Propsteikirche Beatae Mariae Virginis.

== History ==
The site of the present cathedral has been the location of many other Christian buildings, for example a Romanesque basilica and a church hall. In 742, Saint Boniface erected a church on the mound where Erfurt Cathedral is now sited. In the mid-12th century, the foundations of the original church were used for a Romanesque basilica. In the early 14th century, the mound was enlarged to make room for St Mary's Cathedral.

In 1184 it was the site of the Erfurt latrine disaster when a floor collapsed during an assembly summoned by Henry VI, King of Germany. About 60 people, including many nobles, drowned in the liquid excrement underneath.

Martin Luther was ordained in the cathedral on 3 April 1507.

== Architecture ==
The architecture of Erfurt Cathedral is mainly Gothic and originates from the 14th and 15th centuries. The building has many notable architectural features, including the stained glass windows and the interior furnishings. The central spire of the cathedral's three towers houses the Maria Gloriosa which, at the time of its casting by Geert van Wou in 1497, was the world's largest free-swinging bell. It is the largest surviving medieval bell in the world. It is known for the purity of its tone.

== Relics and treasures ==
The cathedral houses many rare and rich furnishings and sculptures, including the tomb of the supposedly bigamous Count von Gleichen, accompanied by both of his wives, a stucco altar from around 1160, a bronze candelabra called Erfurter Wolfram, the oldest free standing cast work in Germany, and, out on the portal, statues of the Wise and Foolish Virgins.

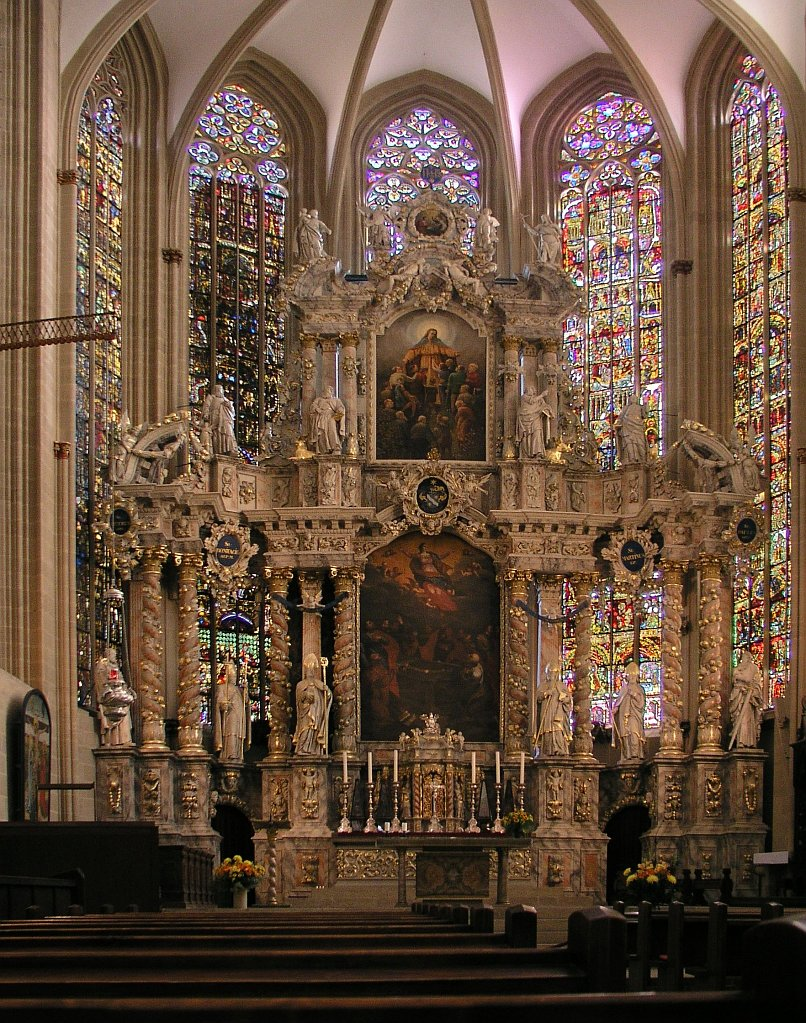
The altar

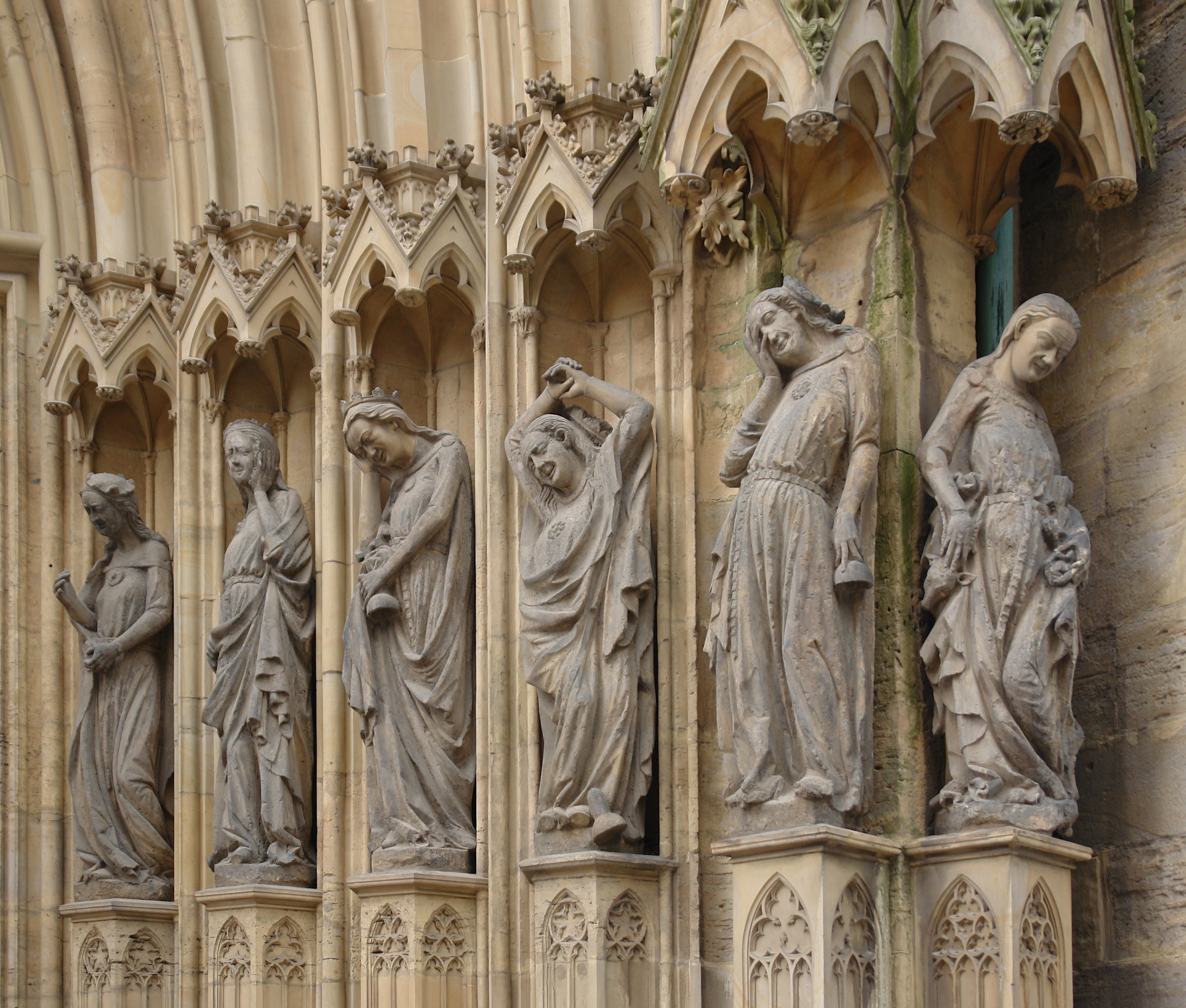
The Foolish Virgins of the parable The Ten Virgins

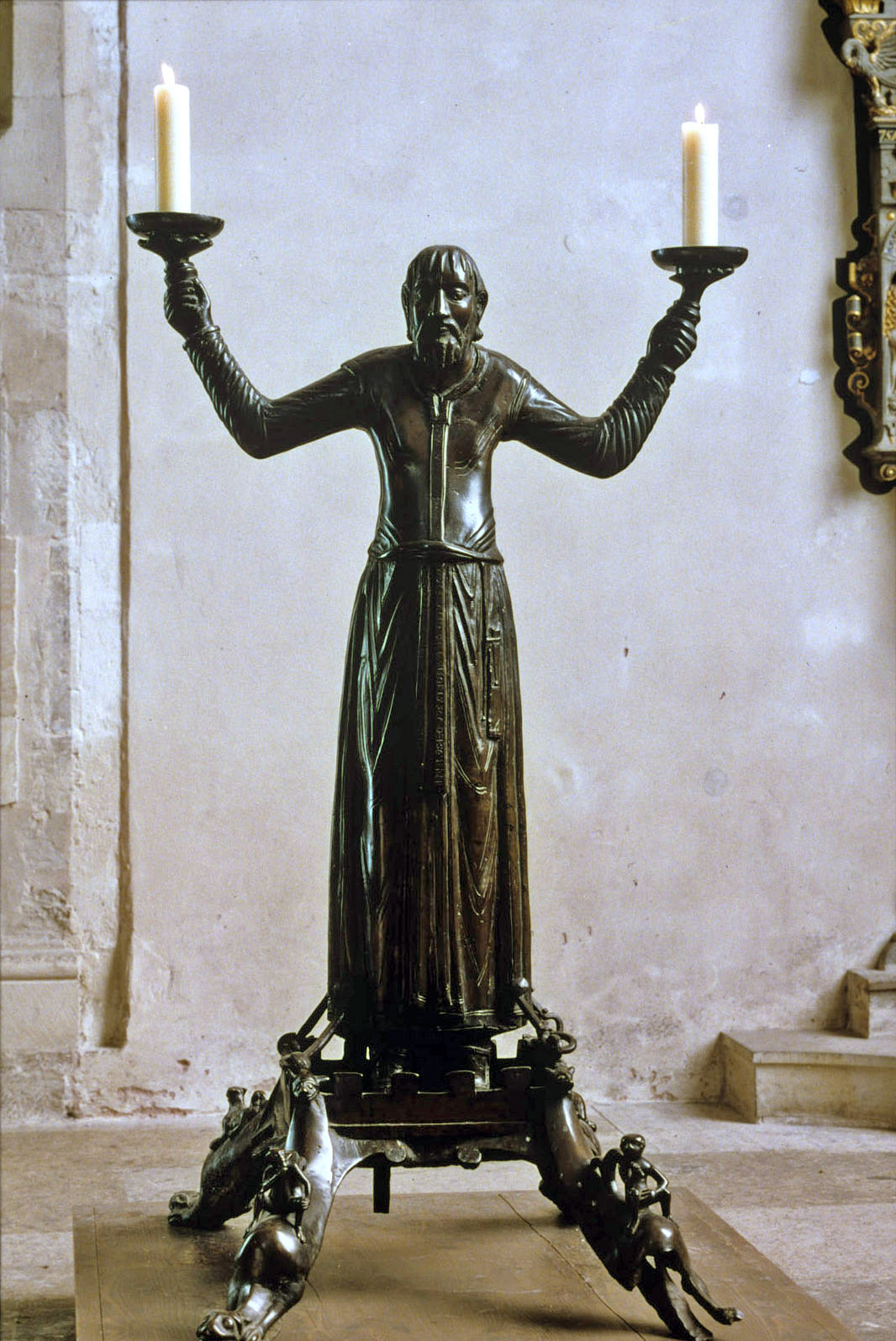
Wolfram candelabra

== Bells ==
The cathedral has a total of 16 bells including 3 bourdon bells, distributed across various bell towers and turrets. 12 of which are use for pealing.

The supporting foundation consists of the six largest bells, including the largest bell or bourdon Gloriosa, which is housed in the lower belfry of the central tower. The official name of the bourdon is actually Maria Gloriosa, although it is also known simply as the Erfurt Bell.

Since its complete restoration in 2004, the bourdon has been used judiciously, primarily for reasons of historic preservation. According to the ringing schedule, it rings mainly on major church holidays. Although its sound surpasses all other bells, its unique tonal spectrum can only be truly experienced when it rings alone. When the Gloriosa is rung, it is always the first bell in Erfurt to be rung. All other Erfurt church bells join in its peal at a later time.

The 2nd and 3rd bourdon bells Trinity and the Joseph respectively are the remnants of a five-bell peal, whose destroyed bells were recast in 1961 by bell founder Franz Peter Schilling in Apolda, using the same tones and retaining their names.

The two clock bells, Martha (for the full hours) and Elisabeth (for the quarter hours), were cast with a shortened rib and are rigidly suspended in the lantern of the central tower. Next to them is the consecration bell, which until 2009 rang in the roof turret; today, together with the small quarter-hour bell, it is located in the central tower and, installed on the old tower clock below the Gloriosa, strikes the hours.

| No. | Name (German) | Name (English) | Year | Caster | Diameter (mm) | Mass (kg) | Strike tone (HT−^{1}/_{16}) | Bell location |
|---|---|---|---|---|---|---|---|---|
| 1 | Maria Gloriosa (Bourdon) | Maria Gloriosa | 1497 | Gerhardus de Wou, Erfurt | 2,560 | 11,450 | e^{0} +3 | Middle Tower, lower |
| 2 | Dreifaltigkeit (2nd Bourdon) | Trinity | 1721 | Nicolaus Jonas Sorber | 1,940 | 4,900 | g^{0} +12 | North tower |
| 3 | Joseph (3rd Bourdon) | Joseph | 1961 | Glockengießerei Schilling, Apolda | 1,840 | 4,600 | a^{0} +8 | South Tower |
| 4 | Andreas | Andreas | 1961 | Glockengießerei Schilling, Apolda | 1,540 | 2,600 | c^{1} +11 | North Tower |
| 5 | Christophorus | Christophorus | 1961 | Glockengießerei Schilling, Apolda | 1,360 | 1,900 | d^{1} +10 | South Tower |
| 6 | Johannes Baptist | John the Baptist | 1720 | Nicolaus Jonas Sorber | 1,190 | 1,000 | e^{1} +7 | South Tower |
| 7 | Cosmas und Damian | Cosmas and Damian | 1625 | Jakob König, Erfurt | 750 | 200 | des^{2} | Middle Tower, upper |
| 8 | Cantabona | Cantabona | 1492 | Hans Sinderam | 650 | 300 | g^{2} | Middle Tower, upper |
| 9 | Engelchen | Little angel | about 1475 | Claus von Mühlhausen, Erfurt | 550 | 125 | as^{2} | Middle Tower, upper |
| 10 | Namenlose | Nameless | 1475 | Meister Peter | 500 | 75 | b^{2} | Middle Tower, upper |
| 11 | Wandlungsglocke | Paul's Bell | 1961 | Glockengießerei Schilling, Apolda | 550 | 100 | f^{2} | Dachreiter (Hochchor) |
| 12 | Paulusglocke | Paul | 2009 | Br. Michael Reuter, Maria Laach | 390 | 42 | d^{3} | Dachreiter (Hochchor) |

== See also ==
- St. Augustine's Monastery (Erfurt)
- Predigerkirche (Erfurt)
- Architecture of cathedrals and great churches
