= Toilet-related injuries and deaths =

There have been many toilet-related injuries and deaths throughout history and in urban legends.

== Accidental injuries ==
Infants and toddlers have fallen headfirst into toilet bowls and drowned. Safety devices exist to help prevent such accidents. It is highly unlikely for adults or teenagers to drown in toilets due to their larger body size. Injuries to adults include bruised buttocks and tail bones, as well as dislocated hips that have resulted from unexpectedly sitting on the toilet bowl rim because the seat is up or loose. Injuries can also be caused by pinching due to splits in plastic seats and/or by splinters from wooden seats, or if the toilet itself collapses or shatters under the user's weight. Older high-tank cast-iron cisterns have been known to detach from the wall when the chain is pulled to flush, causing injuries to the user. The 2000 Ig Nobel Prize in Public Health was awarded to three physicians from the Glasgow Western Infirmary for a 1993 case report on wounds sustained to the buttocks due to collapsing toilets. Furthermore, injuries are frequently sustained by people who stand on toilets to reach a height, then slip and fall. There are also instances of people slipping on a wet bathroom floor or from a bath and concussing themselves on the fixture.

Toilet-related injuries are surprisingly common, with some estimates ranging as high as 40,000 in the US every year. In the past, this number would have been much higher, due to the material from which toilet paper was made. This was shown in a 1935 Northern Tissue advertisement, which depicted splinter-free toilet paper. In 2012, 2.3 million toilets in the United States, and about 9,400 in Canada, were recalled due to faulty pressure-assist flush mechanisms which put users at risk of the fixture exploding.

== Injuries caused by animals ==
Animals also cause injuries. Some black widow spiders prefer to spin their webs below the toilet seat due to the presence of insects that can inhabit and surround it. Therefore, several people have been bitten while using a toilet, particularly outhouse toilets. Although there is immediate pain at the bite site, these bites are rarely fatal. The danger of spiders living beneath toilet seats is the subject of Slim Newton's comic 1972 country song "The Redback on the Toilet Seat".

It has been reported that in some cases rats crawl up through toilet sewer pipes and emerge in the toilet bowl, so that toilet users may be at risk of having a rat bite their buttocks. Many rat exterminators do not believe this, as pipes, at generally six inches (15 centimeters) wide, are too large for rats to climb and are also very slippery. Reports by janitors are always on the top floor, and could involve the rats on the roof, entering the soil pipe through the roof vent, lowering themselves into the pipe, and then into the toilet.

In May 2016, an 11-foot snake, a reticulated python, emerged from a squat toilet and bit the man using it on his penis at his home in Chachoengsao Province, Thailand. Both the victim and the python survived.

== Self-induced injury ==
Some instances of toilet-related deaths are attributed to the drop in blood pressure due to the parasympathetic nervous system during bowel movements. Existing circulatory issues may magnify this effect. It is further possible that people succumb on the toilet to chronic constipation, because the Valsalva maneuver is often dangerously used to aid in the expulsion of feces from the rectum during a bowel movement. According to Sharon Mantik Lewis, Margaret McLean Heitkemper, and Shannon Ruff Dirksen, the "Valsalva maneuver occurs during straining to pass a hardened stool. If defecation is suppressed over long periods, problems can occur, such as constipation or stool impaction. The Valsalva maneuver can facilitate defecation. This maneuver involves contraction of the chest muscles on a closed glottis with simultaneous contraction of the abdominal muscles." This means that people can die while "straining at stool." In chapter 8 of their Abdominal Emergencies, David Cline and Latha Stead wrote that "autopsy studies continue to reveal missed bowel obstruction as an unexpected cause of death".

A 2001 Sopranos episode "He is Risen" shows a fictional depiction of the risk, when the character Gigi Cestone has a heart attack on the toilet of his social club while straining to defecate.

== Exploding toilets ==
In the Victorian era, there was a perceived risk of toilets exploding. These scenarios typically include a flammable substance (either accidentally or deliberately) being introduced into the toilet water, and a lit match or cigarette igniting and exploding the toilet. In 2014, Sloan's Flushmate pressure-assisted flushing system, which uses compressed air to force waste down the drain, was recalled after the company received reports of the air tank failing under pressure and shattering the porcelain.

== Historical deaths ==
- In 1945, the German submarine U-1206 was sunk after a toilet accident resulted in seawater flooding into the hull, which created chlorine gas upon contact with a battery and forced the submarine to resurface. At the surface, the sub was discovered and attacked by Allied forces, causing the sub's captain to scuttle the sub so Allied forces could not capture it. This case may not have been due to a malfunction, but rather the possibility that the pressurized flushing system in the U-boats, which was extremely complex and required a training course to operate, may not have been operated properly.
- Godfrey the Hunchback, Duke of Lower Lorraine (an area roughly coinciding with the Netherlands and Belgium), was murdered in 1076 when staying in the Dutch city of Vlaardingen. Supposedly, the assassin ensured which of the latrines, built and drained on the outer side of the wall according to medieval building style, belonged to the duke's sleeping room, and took a position underneath. Some sources claim that a sword was used for the assassination; others mention a sharp iron weapon, which could have been a sword, a spear, or a dagger. However, a spear seems to be the most practical choice. After being stabbed in the bottom, it took him several days to die from internal bleeding. The assassination was ordered by Dirk V, Count of Holland, and his ally Robrecht the Frisian, Count of Flanders.
- The Erfurt latrine disaster of 1184 caused the death of at least 60 people, most of them being nobles.
- George II of Great Britain died on the toilet on October 25, 1760, from an aortic dissection. According to Horace Walpole's memoirs, King George "rose as usual at six, and drank his chocolate; for all his actions were invariably methodic. A quarter after seven he went into a little closet. His German valet de chambre in waiting heard a noise, and running in, found the King dead on the floor." In falling, he had cut his face.
- Ioan P. Culianu was shot dead while on the toilet in the third-floor men's room of Swift Hall on the campus of the University of Chicago on 21 May 1991, in a possibly politically motivated assassination. His killer has never been caught.
- The Abbasid vizier Al-Fadl ibn Sahl was found dead mysteriously in a bathroom in Sarakhs in Northern Khorasan. According to some rumors, the Abbasid caliph al-Ma'mun ibn Harun ar-Rashid had ordered his assassination.
- Elvis Presley died when using the toilet. "Most sources indicate that Elvis was likely sitting in the toilet area, partially nude, and reading when he collapsed." According to Dylan Jones, "Elvis Presley died aged 42 on August 16th, 1977, in the bathroom of the star's own Graceland mansion in Memphis. Sitting on the toilet, he had toppled like a toy soldier and collapsed onto the floor, where he lay in a pool of his own vomit. His light blue pajamas were around his ankles." In similar terms, Elvis biographer Joel Williamson writes, "For some reason — perhaps involving a reaction to the codeine and attempts to move his bowels — he experienced pain and fright while sitting on the toilet. Alarmed, he stood up, dropped the book he was reading, stumbled forward, and fell face down in the fetal position. He struggled weakly and drooled on the rug. Unable to breathe, he died." This led to the common saying, "The King died on the throne".

=== Possible occurrences ===
- Duke Jing of Jin (Ju), ruler of the State of Jin during the Spring and Autumn period of ancient China, died after falling into a toilet pit in summer 581 BC.
- Edmund II of England died of natural causes on November 30, 1016, though some report that he was stabbed in the bowels while attending the outhouse.
- Uesugi Kenshin, a warlord in Japan, died on April 19, 1578, with some reports stating that he was assassinated on the toilet.
- In 1928, Ernest Hemingway suffered a severe head injury in his Paris bathroom when he pulled a skylight down on his head thinking he was pulling on a toilet chain. This left him with a prominent forehead scar, which he carried for the rest of his life.
- Air Canada Flight 797 was destroyed on June 2, 1983, with 23 fatalities after an in-flight fire began in or around the rear lavatory. Investigators were unable to determine the cause or exact point of origin for the fire.
- Michael Anderson Godwin, a convicted murderer in South Carolina who had his sentence reduced from death by the electric chair, sat on the metal toilet in his cell while fixing his television. When he bit one of the wires, the resultant electric shock killed him. Another convicted murderer, Laurence Baker in Pittsburgh, was electrocuted while listening to the television on homemade earphones while sitting on a metal toilet.
- A collision between a disabled Cessna 182 and a row of portable toilets on May 2, 2009, at Thun Field (south-east of Tacoma), despite an engine failure at 150 feet (46 m) altitude, ended without fatalities; the toilets "kind of cushioned things" for the 67-year-old pilot.
- British businessman and Conservative politician Christopher Shale was found dead in a portable toilet at the Glastonbury Festival on June 26, 2011. It is suspected he died of a heart attack.
- Aboard ships, the head (ship's toilet) and fittings associated with it are cited as one of the most common reasons for the sinking of tens of thousands of boats of all types and sizes. Heads typically have through-hull fittings located below the water line to draw flush water and eliminate waste. Boats sink when fittings fail or the toilet back siphons.

== Urban legends ==
Urban legends have been reported regarding the dangers of using a toilet in a variety of situations. Several of them are questionable. These include some cases of the presence of venomous spiders but do not include the Australian redback spider, which has a reputation for hiding under toilet seats. These recent fears have emerged from a series of hoax emails originating in the Blush Spider hoax, which began circulating the internet in 1999. Spiders have also been reported to live under seats of airplanes. However, the cleaning chemicals used in the toilets would kill the spiders.

In large cities like New York City, sewer rats often hold a mythical status due to their size and ferocity, resulting in tales of the rodents crawling up sewer pipes to attack an unwitting occupant. Of late, stories about terrorists booby trapping the seat to castrate their targets have begun appearing. Another myth is the risk of being sucked into an aircraft lavatory as a result of vacuum pressure during a flight.

== See also ==
- List of unusual deaths
- Sanitation
- List of people who died on the toilet
