= German submarine U-1206 =

German World War II submarine

History

Nazi Germany
- Name: U-1206
- Ordered: 2 April 1942
- Builder: Schichau-Werke, Danzig
- Yard number: 1576
- Laid down: 12 June 1943
- Launched: 30 December 1943
- Commissioned: 16 March 1944
- Fate: Scuttled due to accident on 14 April 1945 in the North Sea near Peterhead, Scotland, at position 57°21′N 01°39′W. 4 dead and 46 survivors.

General characteristics
- Class & type: Type VIIC submarine
- Displacement: 769 tonnes (757 long tons) surfaced; 871 t (857 long tons) submerged
- Length: 67.23 m (220 ft 7 in) o/a; 50.50 m (165 ft 8 in) pressure hull
- Beam: 6.20 m (20 ft 4 in) o/a; 4.70 m (15 ft 5 in) pressure hull
- Height: 9.60 m (31 ft 6 in)
- Draught: 4.74 m (15 ft 7 in)
- Installed power: 2,800–3,200 PS (2,100–2,400 kW; 2,800–3,200 bhp) (diesels); 750 PS (550 kW; 740 shp) (electric)
- Propulsion: 2 shafts; 2 × diesel engines; 2 × electric motors
- Speed: 17.7 knots (32.8 km/h; 20.4 mph) surfaced; 7.6 knots (14.1 km/h; 8.7 mph) submerged
- Range: 8,500 nmi (15,700 km; 9,800 mi) at 10 knots (19 km/h; 12 mph) surfaced; 80 nmi (150 km; 92 mi) at 4 knots (7.4 km/h; 4.6 mph) submerged
- Test depth: 230 m (750 ft); Crush depth: 250–295 m (820–968 ft)
- Complement: 4 officers, 40–56 enlisted
- Armament: 5 × 53.3 cm (21 in) torpedo tubes (four bow, one stern); 14 × torpedoes or 26 TMA mines; 1 × 8.8 cm (3.46 in) deck gun (220 rounds); 1 × 3.7 cm (1.5 in) Flak M42 AA gun; 2 × twin 2 cm (0.79 in) C/30 anti-aircraft guns

Service record
- Part of: 8th U-boat Flotilla; 16 March 1944 – 31 January 1945; 11th U-boat Flotilla; 1 February – 14 April 1945
- Identification codes: M 05 768
- Commanders: Oblt.z.S. Günther Fritze; 16 March – July 1944; Kptlt. Karl-Adolf Schlitt; July 1944 – 14 April 1945
- Operations: 1 patrol: 6 – 14 April 1945
- Victories: None

German submarine U-1206 was a Type VIIC U-boat of Nazi Germany's Kriegsmarine during World War II. She was laid down on 12 June 1943 at F. Schichau GmbH in Danzig and went into service on 16 March 1944. The submarine was scuttled on 14 April 1945 after being attacked by British forces after she was forced to the surface by problems arising from a malfunctioning plumbing system.

== Design ==
German Type VIIC submarines were preceded by the shorter Type VIIB submarines. U-1206 had a displacement of 769 tonnes (757 long tons) when at the surface and 871 tonnes (857 long tons) while submerged. She had a total length of 67.10 m (220 ft 2 in), a pressure hull length of 50.50 m (165 ft 8 in), a beam of 6.20 m (20 ft 4 in), a height of 9.60 m (31 ft 6 in), and a draught of 4.74 m (15 ft 7 in). The submarine was powered by two Germaniawerft F46 four-stroke, six-cylinder supercharged diesel engines producing a total of 2,800 to 3,200 metric horsepower (2,060 to 2,350 kW; 2,760 to 3,160 shp) for use while surfaced, two AEG GU 460/8–27 double-acting electric motors producing a total of 750 metric horsepower (550 kW; 740 shp) for use while submerged. She had two shafts and two 1.23 m (4 ft) propellers. The boat was capable of operating at depths of up to 230 metres (750 ft).

The submarine had a maximum surface speed of 17.7 knots (32.8 km/h; 20.4 mph) and a maximum submerged speed of 7.6 knots (14.1 km/h; 8.7 mph). When submerged, the boat could operate for 80 nautical miles (150 km; 92 mi) at 4 knots (7.4 km/h; 4.6 mph); when surfaced, she could travel 8,500 nautical miles (15,700 km; 9,800 mi) at 10 knots (19 km/h; 12 mph). U-1206 was fitted with five 53.3 cm (21 in) torpedo tubes (four fitted at the bow and one at the stern), fourteen torpedoes, one 8.8 cm (3.46 in) SK C/35 naval gun, (220 rounds), one 3.7 cm (1.5 in) Flak M42 and two twin 2 cm (0.79 in) C/30 anti-aircraft guns. The boat had a complement of between forty-four and sixty.

== Service history ==
After being commissioned, under the command of Oberleutnant zur See Günther Fritze, the submarine took part in training exercises with the 8th U-boat Flotilla until July 1944 when it was assigned to the 11th U-boat Flotilla. Command was handed over to 27 year old Kapitänleutnant Karl-Adolf Schlitt. The boat was then fitted with a Schnorchel underwater-breathing apparatus before being released for patrol duties.

The boat's emblem was a white stork on a black shield with green beak and legs.

=== Patrols ===
On 28 March 1945 the submarine departed from Kiel for its first training patrol in the North Sea, returning on 30 March. The submarine departed from Horten Naval Base for a one-day patrol on 2 April, and its first active patrol began on 6 April when it departed from Kristiansand.

=== Fate ===
U-1206 was one of the late-war boats fitted with new deepwater high-pressure toilets which allowed them to be used while running at depth. Flushing these facilities was an extremely complicated procedure and special technicians were trained to operate them. Opening valves in the wrong sequence could result in waste or seawater flowing back into the hull.

On 14 April 1945, 24 days before the end of the war in Europe, while U-1206 was cruising at a depth of 200 feet (61 m), eight nautical miles (15 km; 9.2 mi) off Peterhead, Scotland, misuse of the new toilet caused large amounts of seawater to flood the boat. According to the commander's official report, while in the engine room helping to repair one of the diesel engines, he was informed that a malfunction involving the toilet caused a leak in the forward section. The leak flooded the submarine's batteries (beneath the head) causing them to generate chlorine gas, leaving him with no alternative but to surface. Once surfaced, U-1206 was discovered and bombed by British patrols, forcing Schlitt to scuttle the submarine. One man had died of illness a day before the mishap, and 46 were captured. Three men drowned in the heavy seas after abandoning the vessel.

During survey work for the BP Forties Field oil pipeline to Cruden Bay in the mid 1970s, the remains of U-1206 were found at 57°21′N 01°39′W approximately 70 m (230 ft) underwater. The site survey performed by Royal Commission on the Ancient and Historical Monuments of Scotland (RCAHMS) suggests that the leak that forced U-1206 to surface may have occurred after running into a wreck located at the same site.

A large number of sources incorrectly attribute this incident to U-120. (Note: Sources asserting incorrectly that U-120 sank because of a malfunctioning toilet include: Justin Heimberg; David Gomberg (2009). Would You Rather...?'s Read It and Wipe: Condensed Comedy for the Can. Seven Footer Press. p. 69. ISBN 978-1-934734-10-0.; David Hatcher Childress (2001). A Hitchhiker's Guide to Armageddon. Adventures Unlimited Press. p. 154. ISBN 978-0-932813-84-8.; James F. Dunnigan; Albert A. Nofi (1994). Dirty little secrets of World War II: military information no one told you about the greatest, most terrible war in history. W. Morrow. p. 273. ISBN 978-0-688-12235-5.; Mark Mirabello (2009). Handbook for Rebels and Outlaws. Mark Mirabello. p. 185. ISBN 978-1-906958-00-8.; Sources reporting U-1206 sank because of a malfunctioning toilet include: Williamson, Gordon (2006). Wolf Pack: The Story of the U-Boat in World War II. Osprey. p. 166. ISBN 978-1-84603-141-0.; Williamson, Gordon; Pavlović, Darko (2001). Grey Wolf: U-Boat Crewman of World War II. Osprey. p. 26. ISBN 978-1-84176-312-5.; Clay Blair (1998). Hitler's U-boat War: The hunted, 1942–1945. Random House. p. 673. ISBN 978-0-679-45742-8.)

== See also ==
- Toilet-related injuries and deaths

== Bibliography ==
- Busch, Rainer; Röll, Hans-Joachim (1999). German U-boat commanders of World War II : a biographical dictionary. Translated by Brooks, Geoffrey. London, Annapolis, Md: Greenhill Books, Naval Institute Press. ISBN 1-55750-186-6.
- Busch, Rainer; Röll, Hans-Joachim (1999). Deutsche U-Boot-Verluste von September 1939 bis Mai 1945 [German U-boat losses from September 1939 to May 1945]. Der U-Boot-Krieg (in German). Vol. IV. Hamburg, Berlin, Bonn: Mittler. ISBN 3-8132-0514-2.
- Gröner, Erich; Jung, Dieter; Maass, Martin (1991). German Warships 1815–1945, U-boats and Mine Warfare Vessels. Vol. 2. Translated by Thomas, Keith; Magowan, Rachel. London: Conway Maritime Press. ISBN 0-85177-593-4.
- Niestle, Axel (1998). German U-Boat Losses During World War II. Greenhill. ISBN 1-85367-352-8.
