= Agnes of Hohenstaufen (died 1184) =

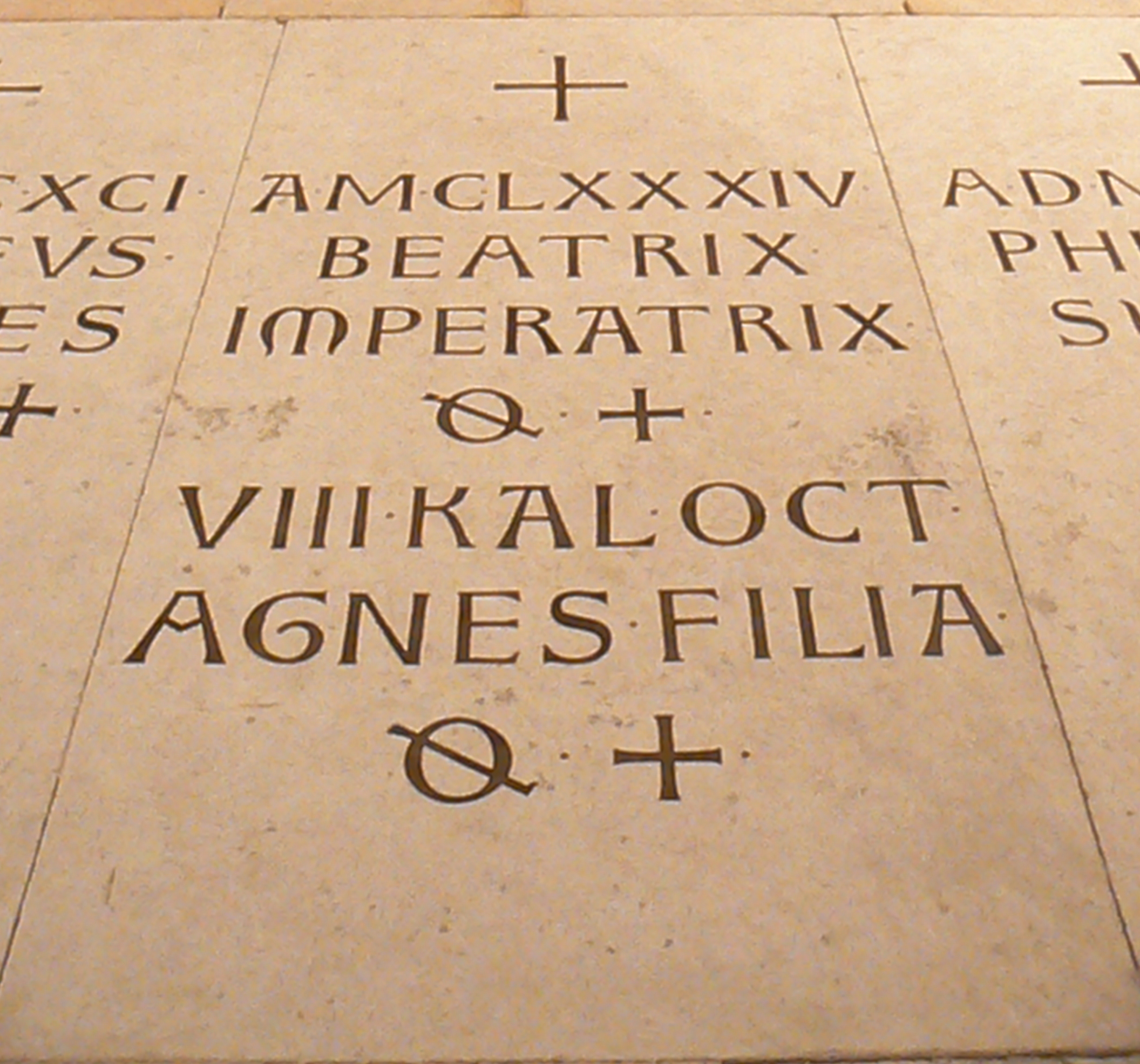
Modern tomb slab of Agnes in Speyer Cathedral

Agnes (1179 – 8 October 1184) was a princess of the House of Hohenstaufen. She was the youngest child of Frederick I, Holy Roman Emperor, and his second wife, Beatrice of Burgundy.

Agnes was born in early 1179. Her brother Philip had been born around February 1178, when Beatrice and Frederick were in Genoa. The date of her birth can be deduced from her young age at death and the established timeline for the births of her siblings. Only one medieval source, Johann von Mutterstadt, mentions her name. In all other medieval sources, she is referred to only as a daughter of Frederick or Beatrice.

Agnes was betrothed at a young age to Emeric, the son of King Béla III of Hungary. As Emeric was born in 1174, they were both children at the time, although he was a few years older. Owing to her death, the marriage never took place. The purpose of the marriage, from Béla III's perspective, was to secure peace and friendship in the west while pursuing an expansionist policy against Byzantium in the east. In 1184, sources record the proposed marriage of an unnamed daughter of Frederick I to Richard the Lionheart, but this was one of Agnes' older sisters, whose name is uncertain.

Agnes died on 8 October 1184 and was buried alongside her mother in Speyer Cathedral. Two separate sources report on the close timing of the deaths of Agnes and her mother. The Chronicle of Saint Peter of Erfurt records how she was still a little girl (licet parvula) and was betrothed (desponsata) to the son of the king of Hungary at the time of her death. The Marbach Annals record that she died not long before 1 November 1184 and Beatrice not long after, noting also that she was betrothed at the time of her death. Possibly both Agnes and Beatrice were ill in September, when Frederick set out on his sixth Italian expedition, since neither accompanied him.

In his chronicle of the bishops of Speyer, Johann von Mutterstadt, who died in 1472, reports how, during the opening of a tomb for King Adolf of Germany in Speyer Cathedral, a small casket was found containing the body of a young girl wrapped in silk. The casket was decorated with the effigy of a little girl and contained the epitaph: "On 8 October, Agnes, daughter of King Frederick the Emperor, died" (Octavo idus octobris Agnes filia regis Friderici imperatoris obiit).

== Works cited ==
- Assmann, Erwin (1977). "Friedrich Barbarossas Kinder". Deutsches Archiv für Erforschung des Mittelalters. 33: 435–472.
- Freed, John B. (2016). Frederick Barbarossa: The Prince and the Myth. Yale University Press.
- Loud, Graham A. (2025). Frederick Barbarossa. Reaktion Books.
- Makk, Ferenc (1989). The Árpáds and the Comneni: Political Relations between Hungary and Byzantium in the 12th century. Translated by György Novák. Akadémiai Kiadó.
