= List of people who have died while on the toilet =

Numerous individuals have died while using a toilet facility or in the process of defecation or urination. This includes confirmed or suspected historical figures as well as more recent notable cases.

== Pre-20th century ==
Date	Location	Name	Age	Description	Source
Summer of 581 BC	Jin, China	Duke Jing of Jin	Unknown	Died falling into a toilet pit.	
8 April 217 AD	Between Edessa and Carrhae, Roman Empire	Caracalla	29	Murdered by his soldiers while stopping to urinate on his way to Edessa.	
11/12 March 222	Rome	Elagabalus	18	Murdered by the Praetorian Guard "in a latrine in which he had taken refuge".	
336 AD	Constantinople, Eastern Roman Empire	Arius	80	Died from explosive gastrointestinal problems inside of a public toilet	
30 November 1016	Oxford or London, England	Edmund Ironside	26	Stabbed to death while defecating in a privy.	
4 November 1035	Lysá nad Labem, Bohemia	Jaromír, Duke of Bohemia	60–70	Was assassinated by being stabbed with the use of a spear from under the privy seat while defecating.	
26/27 February 1076	Vlaardingen, Lower Lorraine	Godfrey IV, Duke of Lower Lorraine	Unknown	Was assassinated by being stabbed with a spear from under the privy seat while defecating.	
1484	Predjama Castle, Slovenia	Erasmus of Lueg	60–70	According to a popular but unfounded legend, the robber baron Erasmus was betrayed by one of his men and was killed, while on a toilet, by a shot from a cannon or catapult.	
19 April 1578	Echigo Province, Japan	Uesugi Kenshin	48	Allegedly assassinated by a ninja while using a toilet, but very unlikely because his anticipation of his own death is recorded in a death poem. Early sources record his deterioration of health, his complaints of pain in the chest "like an iron ball", and, as Kenshin Gunki recorded, "on the 9th day of the 3rd month, he had a stomach ache in his toilet. This, unfortunately, persisted until the 13th day, when he died". It is much more likely that he suffered from esophageal cancer.	
25 October 1760	Kensington Palace, London, England	George II of Great Britain	76	Collapsed shortly after attending to his close stool, possibly died of an aortic aneurysm.	
1892	Philadelphia, Pennsylvania, United States	J.W., also known as Balloon Man	29	Suffered from congenital aganglionic megacolon, which brought him considerable fame for his bloated abdomen. He suffered from constipation and was found dead in a bathroom at the age of 29, apparently having died trying to defecate. His eight-foot-long colon is currently on display at the Mütter Museum in Philadelphia.	

== 20th and 21st centuries ==
Date	Location	Name	Age	Description	Source
3 August 1966	Los Angeles, California, United States	Lenny Bruce	40	Died from acute morphine poisoning caused by an overdose in the bathroom of his home in Hollywood Hills.	
22 June 1969	Chelsea, London	Judy Garland	47	Overdosed on barbiturates while using a toilet.	
24 October 1971	Paris, France	George Dyer	38	Overdose of alcohol and amphetamine while using a toilet. Portrayed in The Black Triptychs	
16 August 1977	Memphis, Tennessee, United States	Elvis Presley	42	He was found dead on the bathroom floor. The cause of death was cardiac arrest due to alleged drug overdose.	
8 March 1989	Columbia, South Carolina, United States	Michael Godwin	28	Former Suffolk, Virginia, resident accused of fatally beating 24-year-old Molly Royem with an iron in West Columbia, South Carolina; sentenced to death by electrocution, but later reduced to a life sentence. He was accidentally electrocuted when he bit a pair of earphone wires, in an attempt to fix a broken television, while sitting on a metal toilet at the Central Correctional Institute in neighboring Columbia.	
21 May 1991	Chicago, Illinois, United States	Ioan Petru Culianu	41	Assassinated by an unknown party while using the toilet in the University of Chicago Divinity School's Swift Hall.	
19 January 1996	Los Angeles, California, United States	Don Simpson	52	Died of heart failure caused by combined drug intoxication in the bathroom of his home in Bel Air.	
8 March 2004	Hollywood Hills, California, United States	Robert Pastorelli	49	Overdosed on morphine while on a toilet.	
25 June 2011	Pilton, Somerset, England	Christopher Shale	56	Died of a heart attack on a portable toilet while at Glastonbury Festival.	
17 May 2013	Marcos Paz, Buenos Aires, Argentina	Jorge Rafael Videla	87	Died of a heart attack while on a jail toilet after slipping in the shower.	
10 October 2016	Garmisch-Partenkirchen, Bavaria, Germany	Tamme Hanken	56	Died of sudden heart failure on a hotel toilet.	
21 June 2019	Doha, Qatar	Toufiq M Seraj	63	Fell unconscious on an aeroplane toilet en route from Dhaka to Doha; he was pronounced dead of a massive heart attack shortly after landing.	
23 November 2021	Seoul, Republic of Korea	Chun Doo-hwan	90	Had multiple myeloma; found "fallen down" by a probable heart attack in a toilet at home.	
4 March 2022	Auburndale, Florida, United States	Aaron Henderson	40	Crushed to death by a bulldozer while using a portable toilet.	
18 October 2025	Florida, United States	Sam Rivers	48	Died in a bathroom in his Florida home.	

== Deaths in fiction ==
- Donald Gennaro (played by Martin Ferrero) is eaten by a Tyrannosaurus rex while sitting on the toilet of a destroyed restroom cabin in the 1993 movie Jurassic Park.
- South Park: In the 2012 episode "Reverse Cowgirl", Clyde's mother falls into the toilet and suffers disembowelment.
- In A Song of Ice and Fire, Tywin Lannister is shot with a crossbow by his son Tyrion while on the privy. In the book series, Tywin is shot in A Storm of Swords. In the television adaptation Game of Thrones, Tyrion kills Tywin in the season 4 episode "The Children".
- On the television show The Sopranos, in the episode "He Is Risen", the character of Gigi Cestone, a capo in the DiMeo crime family, died from a fatal heart attack while constipated on the toilet in his social club.

== See also ==
- List of unusual deaths
- Toilet-related injuries and deaths
