= Strike tone =

Sound from a percussion instrument

The strike tone, strike note, or tap note, of a percussion instrument (e.g. bell, chime or gong) when struck, is the dominant note perceived immediately by the human ear. An analysis of the bell's frequency spectrum reveals that the fundamental frequency of the instrument only produces a weak sound and the characteristic strike note is a human perception of sounds built up by the complex series of partials or frequency components that are generated. The partials are given names in order hum, prime, tierce, quint and the nominal.

== Composition of the strike tone ==
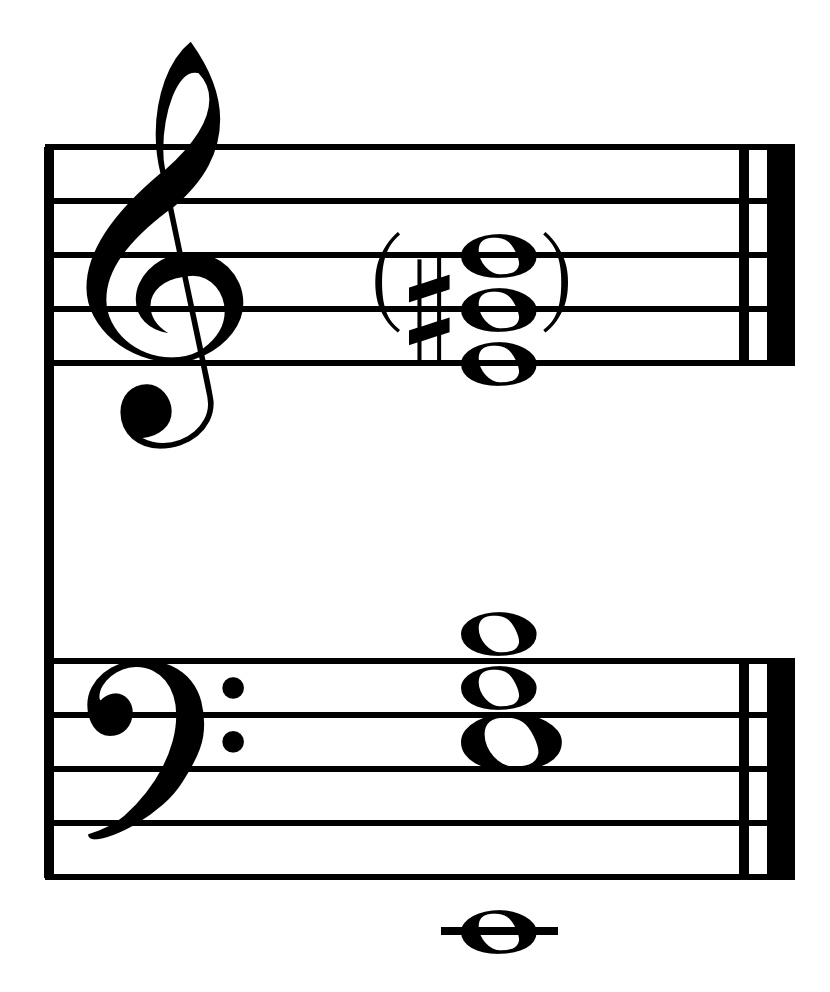
The main partials sounded by the Erfurt bell (1497) or any harmonically-tuned bell in musical notation. (Note: Strike note shown on C. Hemony appears to be the first to propose this tuning. (Fuller-Maitland 1910, p. 615)) The strike note/prime is E, with hum note, minor third, fifth, octave or nominal, and major third and perfect fifth in the second octave.

When a bell is struck, the energy imparted causes vibration of the bell in a complex manner and a series of tones known as partials or harmonics are generated.

"This atonal strike sound includes many inharmonic partials that die out quickly, giving way to a strike note or strike tone that is dominated by the prominent partials of the bell. Most observers identify the metallic strike note as having a pitch at or near the frequency of the strong second partial (prime or fundamental), but to others its pitch is an octave higher. Finally, as the sound of the bell ebbs, the slowly decaying hum tone (an octave below the prime, see subharmonic) lingers on." "When a bell is properly struck, the first note that prominently attracts the attention of the ear is what is known as the strike note, tap note, or fundamental, this is what we call the note of the bell. The low sound heard after the strike note has lost its intensity is called the hum. There are also present a minor third and perfect fifth in the first octave, and a major third and perfect fifth in the second octave."

Regarding their names: "When struck by its clapper, a bell vibrates in a complex way...In general, each normal mode of vibration contributes one partial to the sound of the bell. These partials are customarily given names such as hum, prime, minor third (or tierce), fifth (or quint), octave (or nominal), upper octave, etc. The strike note of the bell, which is determined by three partials (the octave, upper fifth, and the upper octave), is generally close to the pitch of the prime in a well-tuned bell." Bells with good tone are well-tuned.

"From this it will be seen that (1) the hum note should be a perfect octave below the strike note; (2) the nominal should be a perfect octave above the strike note; (3) the third above the strike note is a minor 3rd and the fifth perfect; (4) that all these notes should be in perfect tune with each other. Above the nominal the major 3rd and perfect 5th can be heard in bells of considerable size; in smaller bells they are so weak as not to be worthy of consideration." However, historical approaches to bell tuning meant that in the past "Very few bells agree with these conditions. Generally the hum note is a sixth or seventh, and in rare cases a ninth below the strike note. The nominal is somewhere about an octave or a ninth above the strike note, and the other notes diverge accordingly. Bells that are swung are more likely to conform to the conditions than those that are struck."

== Tuning a bell ==
When the strike note or fundamental of a bell is tuned, its harmonic series must be tuned with it. Bells often contain secondary strike tones which are inharmonic, or unrelated to the harmonic series of the original strike note. "Whether a founder tunes the nominal or the strike note makes little difference, however, because the nominal is one of the main partials that determines the tuning of the strike note," the nominal, twelfth, and double octave being the most important in regards to strike note, resembling harmonics 2:3:4.

The hum tone, which should be an octave below the strike tone, is the actual first partial: "The strike tone appears to be the fifth partial of a rather unusual series: the ear misjudging it for the octave below, and accepting it as the fundamental of the series. That the strike tone is in some sense aural perception is no longer doubted: the most likely explanation is that it is a perceptual effect, possibly a difference tone created subjectively by the ear from two objectively existing partials."

"It is interesting that the hum tone of a bell is generally not audible at all—the perceived pitch of the bell (called the 'strike tone') is one octave higher than the hum tone, and there is no component in the sound spectrum of the bell corresponding to the strike tone." "The strike note is of great interest to psychoacousticians, because it is a subjective tone created by three strong nearly harmonic partials in the bell sound. The octave or nominal, the twelfth, and the upper octave normally have frequencies nearly in the ratios 2:3:4 [See Table]. The ear assumes these to be partials of a missing fundamental, which it hears as the strike note." In a well-tuned bell the strike note is generally close to the prime.

In chimes, modes 4, 5, and 6 appear to determine the strike tone and have frequencies in the ratios 9^{2}:11^{2}:13^{2}, or 81:121:169, "which are close enough to the ratios 2:3:4 for the ear to consider them nearly harmonic and to use them as a basis for establishing a virtual pitch."

Below are the names and relative frequencies of important partials of tuned church bell or carillon bell: (Note: Fletcher & Rossing 2008, p. 682 cites Ross & Perrin, 1987.)

				Ratio to prime (or strike note)		
Mode	Name of partials	Note name	Semitones to prime	Ideal (just)	Equal temperament	Actual bell
(2,0)	Hum	D_{4}	-12	0.500	0.500	0.500
(2,1^{♯})	Prime, fundamental	D_{5}	0	1.000	1.000	1.000
(3,1)	Tierce, minor third	F_{5}	3	1.200	1.189	1.183
(3,1^{♯})	Quint, fifth	A_{5}	7	1.500	1.498	1.506
(4,1)	Nominal, octave	D_{6}	12	2.000	2.000	2.000
(4,1^{♯})	Major third, deciem	F^{♯}_{6}	16	2.500	2.520	2.514
(2,2)	Fourth, undeciem	G_{6}	17	2.667	2.670	2.662
(5,1)	Twelfth, duodeciem	A_{6}	19	3.000	2.997	3.011
(6,1)	Upper octave, double octave	D_{7}	24	4.000	4.000	4.166
(7,1)	Upper fourth, undeciem	G_{7}	29	5.333	5.339	5.433
(8,1)	Upper sixth	B_{7}	33	6.667	6.727	6.796
(9,1)	Triple octave	D_{8}	36	8.000	8.000	8.215

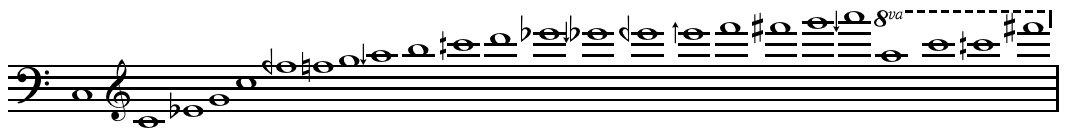
Spectrum of a Winchester Cathedral bell as analyzed by Jonathan Harvey using FFT. "The bell produces a secondary pitch (f') which lies outside that 'inharmonic series though it is clearly audible when the bell is struck, 'to curiously thrilling and disturbing effect.'" The strike tone is middle C, the hum tone an octave below.

== Sources ==
=== Sources ===
- Beach, F.C.; Rines, G.E. (1907). The Americana: A Universal Reference Library, Comprising the Arts and Sciences, Literature, History, Biography, Geography, Commerce, Etc., of the World. Scientific American.
- The Encyclopedia Americana: A Library of Universal Knowledge. Vol. 3. Encyclopedia Americana Corporation. 1918.
- Downes, Michael (2009). Jonathan Harvey : Song offerings and White as jasmine. Farnham, England: Burlington, VT Ashgate. ISBN 978-0-7546-6022-4. OCLC 319321762.
- Fletcher, N.H.; Rossing, T. (2008). The Physics of Musical Instruments. Springer New York. ISBN 978-0-387-98374-5.
- Fuller-Maitland, John Alexander (1910). Grove's dictionary of music and musicians. Macmillan.
- Harvey, Jonathan (1992). Roads, Curtis (ed.). "Mortuos Plango, Vivos Voco: A Realization at IRCAM". Computer Music Journal. ISBN 978-0-262-68078-3.
- Luttrell, Guy L. (1979). The instruments of music. Taylor & Francis.
- Rossing, Thomas (2000). Science of percussion instruments. Singapore River Edge, N.J: World Scientific. ISBN 978-981-02-4158-2. OCLC 45679450.
- Starmer, W. W. (1902). "Bells and Bell Tones". Proceedings of the Musical Association. 28th Session: 25–44. JSTOR 765451.
- White, G.; Louie, G.J. (2005). The Audio Dictionary: Third Edition, Revised and Expanded. University of Washington Press. ISBN 978-0-295-98498-8.
