= Chronicle of Saint Peter's in Erfurt =

The Chronicle of Saint Peter's in Erfurt (Latin: Cronica sancti Petri Erfordensis moderna) is a Latin chronicle of the Holy Roman Empire and the Western Church from 1072 to 1335 with subsequent extensions bringing it down to 1355. The chronicle is in the form of annals and was compiled at the monastery of Saint Peter in Erfurt beginning in 1208.

The Latin name Cronica moderna, which means "new chronicle", is derived from a marginal description in a 14th-century manuscript. The chronicle is divisible into eight parts, which sometimes overlap chronologically. The history before 1208 is based on earlier annals kept at Erfurt and on the Cronica Reinhardsbrunnensis. There are three distinct continuations found in different manuscripts, covering the periods 1335–1338, 1336–1353 and 1335–1355. The last and fullest continuation is based on the other two.

There is only one complete copy of the Chronicle, in Göttingen, State and University Library, ms. hist. 88. This copy dates to 1506 and covers 219 manuscript pages.

== Editions ==
- Oswald Holder-Egger, ed., "Cronica S. Petri Erfordensis moderna", pp. 150–398, in Scriptores rerum Germanicarum in usum scholarum separatim editi, 42: Monumenta Erphesfurtensia saec. XII. XIII. XIV. Monumenta Germaniae Historica. Hannover, 1899.
