= Stalzer =

Stalzer is a surname. Notable people with the surname include:

- Iris Stalzer (born 1968), German politician
- Jim Stalzer (born 1946), American politician
- Lindsay Stalzer (born 1984), American volleyball player

== See also ==
- Stazersee
