= 2025 North Rhine-Westphalia local elections =

Local election in Germany

- 14 September 2025

All municipal and district council seats in North Rhine-Westphalia
- Turnout: 56.8% (▲4.9%)
| | First party | Second party | Third party |
|---|---|---|---|
| Party | CDU | SPD | AfD |
| Last election | 1,213 seats, 34.3% | 912 seats, 24.3% | 185 seats, 5.0% |
| Seats won | 1,205 | 827 | 552 |
| Seat change | ▼8 | ▼86 | ▲366 |
| Popular vote | 2,618,138 | 1,739,246 | 1,140,055 |
| Percentage | 33.3% | 22.1% | 14.5% |
| Swing | ▼1.0 | ▼2.2 | ▲9.4 |
| | Fourth party | Fifth party | Sixth party |
| Party | Greens | Left | FDP |
| Last election | 705 seats, 20.0% | 137 seats, 3.8% | 198 seats, 5.6% |
| Seats won | 466 | 200 | 131 |
| Seat change | ▼239 | ▲63 | ▼66 |
| Popular vote | 1,062,436 | 438,452 | 289,700 |
| Percentage | 13.5% | 5.6% | 3.7% |
| Swing | ▼6.5 | ▲1.8 | ▼1.9 |
- Leading party by district

Local elections in the German state of North Rhine-Westphalia took place on 14 September 2025 to elect district, municipal, and city councils and local boards, as well as mayors in most cities and district administrators in most districts. Runoff elections for mayors and district administrators will be held on 28 September if necessary. There was no five percent hurdle unlike in federal elections.

== Voting eligibility ==
All German and EU citizens aged 16 or over on election day are eligible to vote if they had lived in a municipality for at least sixteen days.

== Events ==
During the election seven candidates of Alternative for Germany (AfD) died, sparking conspiracy theories on social media. The candidates were between the ages of 42 and 80 and - with the exception of one 42-year-old man, who committed suicide - died of natural causes, according to police. Martin Vincentz, chair of the AfD North Rhine-Westphalia said that there was "no indication of an unnatural cause of death", but "if many people see the possibility of a political murder, it's a consequence of the ruthless fight against the AfD over the past few years."

The elected mayor of Herdecke Iris Stalzer (SPD) was stabbed by her adopted daughter on 7 October 2025. She was found in a life-threatening condition and taken to hospital via helicopter. Stalzer has since made a full recovery and was sworn in as the mayor of Herdecke on 4 November 2025.

In 2025, the far-right Third Way party won a seat in the North Rhein-Westphalia local elections.

== Results ==
The following shows the result of the elections to the district councils and district free cities.

| Party | Votes | % | Seats | +/– |
|---|---|---|---|---|
| Christian Democratic Union (CDU) | 2,618,138 | 33.26 | 1,205 | ▼8 |
| Social Democratic Party (SPD) | 1,739,246 | 22.10 | 827 | ▼86 |
| Alternative for Germany (AfD) | 1,140,055 | 14.48 | 552 | ▲366 |
| Alliance 90/The Greens (GRÜNE) | 1,062,436 | 13.50 | 466 | ▼239 |
| The Left (DIE LINKE) | 438,452 | 5.57 | 200 | ▲63 |
| Free Democratic Party (FDP) | 289,700 | 3.68 | 131 | ▼66 |
| Sahra Wagenknecht Alliance (BSW) | 85,884 | 1.09 | 40 | New |
| Volt Germany (Volt) | 86,926 | 1.10 | 32 | ▲19 |
| Die PARTEI (Die PARTEI) | 58,527 | 0.74 | 26 | ▼8 |
| Action Party for Animal Welfare (Tierschutz hier!) | 14,243 | 0.18 | 6 | ▲3 |
| Free Voters (FW) | 8,862 | 0.11 | 4 | New |
| Human Environment Animal Protection Party (Tierschutzpartei) | 7,708 | 0.10 | 3 | Steady |
| Pirate Party (PIRATEN) | 6,330 | 0.08 | 3 | ▼7 |
| Ecological Democratic Party (ÖDP) | 2,426 | 0.03 | 2 | ▼1 |
| Family Party (FAMILIE) | 2,085 | 0.03 | 1 | ▼1 |
| Centre Party (ZENTRUM) | 1,615 | 0.02 | 1 | Steady |
| German Communist Party (DKP) | 825 | 0.01 | 1 | ▼1 |
| Other parties | 13,081 | 0.17 | – | ▼6 |
| Grouping of electors | 293,326 | 3.73 | 148 | ▼23 |
| Independents | 1,634 | 0.02 | – | Steady |
| Total | 7,871,499 | 100.00 | 3,648 | ▲48 |
| Valid votes | 7,871,499 | 98.99 | ▲0.5% | |
| Invalid/blank votes | 80,249 | 1.01 | ▼0.5% | |
| Total votes | 7,951,748 | 100.00 | – | |
| Registered voters/turnout | 13,998,669 | 56.80 | ▲4.9% | |
Source: North Rhine-Westphalia - State Returning Officer - Minister of the Interior

=== Results in independent cities ===
City councils
| City | CDU | SPD | AfD | Grüne | Linke | FDP | BSW | Volt | PARTEI | WG | Others |
|---|---|---|---|---|---|---|---|---|---|---|---|
| Cologne | 19.9 | 19.9 | 9.1 | 25.0 | 10.8 | 3.9 | 1.9 | 5.0 | 1.8 | 2.5 | 0.1 |
| Düsseldorf | 33.5 | 14.9 | 10.6 | 21.9 | 6.4 | 4.9 | 1.6 | 2.5 | 1.0 | 1.6 | 1.0 |
| Dortmund | 22.1 | 24.9 | 16.6 | 16.5 | 8.0 | 2.1 | 2.0 | 1.4 | 1.8 | 2.6 | 2.1 |
| Essen | 30.2 | 22.6 | 16.9 | 12.3 | 5.8 | 1.9 | 1.5 | 1.5 | 1.8 | 3.6 | 1.7 |
| Duisburg | 17.4 | 32.6 | 21.2 | 9.1 | 6.0 | 1.5 | 2.1 | 0.5 | 0.4 | 9.2 | 0.2 |
| Bochum | 20.0 | 28.1 | 14.9 | 14.4 | 9.5 | 1.9 | 1.7 | 1.5 | 1.3 | 5.9 | 0.7 |
| Wuppertal | 22.2 | 28.8 | 17.1 | 11.4 | 8.4 | 4.2 | 2.5 | 0.4 | 1.4 | 2.9 | 0.5 |
| Bielefeld | 29.4 | 21.7 | 12.2 | 15.0 | 10.5 | 4.8 | 1.2 | 1.2 | 1.6 | 1.6 | 0.8 |
| Bonn | 31.9 | 11.8 | 6.0 | 26.3 | 8.7 | 2.9 | 1.1 | 2.7 | 0.9 | 7.0 | 0.5 |
| Münster | 31.3 | 14.1 | 4.5 | 31.6 | 8.4 | 2.9 | – | 4.0 | 1.1 | 0.9 | 1.0 |
| Mönchengladbach | 33.2 | 28.4 | 15.6 | 8.6 | 5.6 | 2.8 | 2.1 | 1.3 | 1.9 | 0.4 | |
| Gelsenkirchen | 19.2 | 30.4 | 29.9 | 4.6 | 4.3 | 2.7 | 1.6 | – | 0.8 | 4.4 | 2.2 |
| Aachen | 32.8 | 13.4 | 7.7 | 27.8 | 7.7 | 2.7 | 1.7 | 3.0 | 1.3 | 1.7 | 0.1 |
| Krefeld | 30.5 | 25.9 | 15.6 | 11.2 | 5.5 | 3.5 | – | – | 1.7 | 2.8 | 3.3 |
| Oberhausen | 26.8 | 26.1 | 21.5 | 8.2 | 5.7 | 2.1 | 2.3 | – | 2.3 | 2.3 | 2.8 |
| Hagen | 26.4 | 19.9 | 22.4 | 7.4 | 3.9 | 3.0 | 3.1 | – | 1.1 | 12.0 | 0.8 |
| Hamm | 22.9 | 46.1 | 16.3 | 4.7 | 2.7 | 2.0 | 1.8 | 0.9 | – | 2.5 | – |
| Mülheim an der Ruhr | 30.1 | 25.5 | 15.1 | 14.2 | 4.7 | 3.2 | – | – | 2.2 | 4.7 | 0.3 |
| Leverkusen | 31.0 | 21.5 | 15.3 | 10.9 | 5.1 | 3.3 | – | 2.5 | – | 10.0 | 0.4 |
| Solingen | 29.9 | 17.7 | 15.0 | 11.3 | 5.2 | 2.0 | – | – | 1.3 | 16.5 | 1.0 |
| Herne | 17.8 | 37.0 | 22.4 | 8.5 | 5.6 | 1.8 | 2.2 | – | – | 3.5 | 1.2 |
| Bottrop | 26.8 | 31.6 | 21.8 | 6.7 | 4.7 | 2.4 | – | – | – | – | 6.1 |
| Remscheid | 27.0 | 31.3 | 16.1 | 8.4 | 6.4 | 4.2 | – | – | – | 6.6 | – |

Mayors
| City | Elected mayor | Party/Ticket | Result | |
| City | Elected mayor | Party/Ticket | 1st round | 2nd round |
|---|---|---|---|---|
| Cologne | Torsten Burmester | SPD | 21.3% | 53.5% |
| Düsseldorf | Stephan Keller | CDU | 43.6% | 60.5% |
| Dortmund | Alexander Kalouti | CDU | 17.0% | 52.9% |
| Essen | Thomas Kufen | CDU | 42.3% | 57.1% |
| Bochum | Jörg Lukat | SPD/Grüne | 43.1% | 64.7% |
| Wuppertal | Miriam Scherff | SPD | 33.3% | 74.6% |
| Bielefeld | Christiana Bauer | CDU | 33.0% | 51.4% |
| Bonn | Guido Déus | CDU | 38.9% | 54.0% |
| Münster | Tilman Fuchs | Grüne | 41.3% | 57.9% |
| Mönchengladbach | Felix Heinrichs | SPD | 43.4% | 63.6% |
| Gelsenkirchen | Andrea Henze | SPD | 37.0% | 66.9% |
| Aachen | Michael Ziemons | CDU | 40.5% | 56.0% |
| Krefeld | Frank Meyer | SPD | 35.9% | 55.0% |
| Oberhausen | Thorsten Berg | SPD | 31.1% | 51.3% |
| Hagen | Dennis Rehbein | CDU | 25.1% | 71.7% |
| Hamm | Marc Herter | SPD | 63.6% | |
| Mülheim an der Ruhr | Nadia Khalaf | SPD | 28.0% | 50.1% |
| Leverkusen | Stefan Hebbel | CDU | 35.9% | 56.6% |
| Solingen | Daniel Flemm | CDU | 31.7% | 57.8% |
| Herne | Frank Dudda | SPD | 51.5% | |
| Bottrop | Matthias Buschfeld | SPD | 38.5% | 61.9% |
| Remscheid | Sven Wolf | SPD | 41.5% | 68.0% |

=== Results in districts ===
District councils
| City | CDU | SPD | AfD | Grüne | Linke | FDP | BSW | Volt | PARTEI | WG | Others |
|---|---|---|---|---|---|---|---|---|---|---|---|
| Recklinghausen | 33.4 | 27.5 | 19.6 | 9.3 | 4.4 | 2.7 | 2.4 | 0.4 | 0.2 | – | – |
| Rhein-Sieg-Kreis | 38.7 | 19.8 | 13.3 | 14.6 | 3.8 | 3.8 | 1.9 | 2.5 | – | 1.2 | 0.5 |
| Aachen | 36.7 | 19.8 | 12.8 | 16.1 | 5.7 | 3.1 | 1.1 | 2.1 | 1.6 | 0.9 | – |
| Mettmann | 36.1 | 16.9 | 14.6 | 14.5 | 4.3 | 5.5 | – | – | – | 4.0 | 4.1 |
| Rhein-Erft-Kreis | 37.2 | 20.9 | 14.7 | 13.3 | 4.4 | 3.5 | 1.9 | 0.8 | – | 2.2 | 1.1 |
| Wesel | 33.2 | 29.0 | 13.5 | 10.8 | 5.5 | 3.5 | – | 0.6 | – | 3.9 | – |
| Rhein-Kreis Neuss | 38.8 | 22.0 | 12.7 | 12.0 | 3.8 | 5.0 | 0.8 | 0.6 | 1.5 | 1.9 | 0.8 |
| Steinfurt | 39.6 | 22.7 | 10.8 | 13.8 | 5.1 | 4.0 | – | – | – | 4.0 | – |
| Märkischer Kreis | 37.0 | 19.1 | 18.3 | 7.8 | 5.8 | 4.6 | 1.5 | – | – | 5.9 | – |
| Unna | 27.2 | 30.8 | 17.0 | 10.0 | 4.7 | 2.7 | 1.4 | 1.1 | 0.3 | 4.8 | 0.1 |
| Borken | 47.6 | 15.0 | 10.1 | 9.6 | 3.8 | 4.3 | 1.3 | – | – | 8.2 | – |
| Gütersloh | 39.7 | 18.2 | 13.7 | 13.0 | 4.6 | 4.2 | – | 0.6 | – | 6.0 | – |
| Lippe | 28.3 | 27.0 | 16.9 | 11.8 | 4.4 | 4.1 | – | – | 0.9 | 3.5 | 3.2 |
| Ennepe-Ruhr-Kreis | 26.0 | 28.9 | 16.7 | 12.9 | 5.5 | 4.5 | 2.0 | 0.1 | 1.2 | 2.1 | 0.2 |
| Kleve | 43.4 | 18.1 | 13.0 | 12.4 | 4.6 | 4.8 | – | – | – | 3.7 | – |
| Minden-Lübbecke | 33.1 | 26.5 | 18.1 | 8.9 | 4.8 | 4.8 | – | – | 0.3 | 3.5 | 0.0 |
| Paderborn | 44.5 | 12.0 | 15.1 | 14.3 | 5.2 | 3.4 | 1.3 | – | 1.5 | 2.7 | – |
| Soest | 39.5 | 19.9 | 13.8 | 10.6 | 3.8 | 5.1 | 1.5 | – | 0.1 | 5.8 | – |
| Viersen | 40.5 | 16.3 | 13.2 | 15.7 | 4.2 | 5.1 | – | 1.1 | 2.3 | 1.7 | – |
| Rheinisch-Bergischer Kreis | 37.3 | 17.6 | 12.0 | 16.8 | 4.6 | 4.6 | – | 3.2 | – | 3.7 | – |
| Warendorf | 41.2 | 17.9 | 10.8 | 13.2 | 4.7 | 4.3 | – | – | 0.3 | 5.8 | 1.7 |
| Siegen-Wittgenstein | 32.2 | 25.4 | 17.0 | 7.9 | 4.8 | 4.8 | – | 2.2 | – | 3.1 | 2.6 |
| Oberbergischer Kreis | 36.3 | 20.5 | 18.1 | 9.6 | 4.3 | 4.0 | 2.4 | – | – | 4.9 | – |
| Düren | 38.6 | 21.0 | 17.9 | 9.0 | 3.8 | 2.8 | 2.1 | 0.7 | – | 4.1 | – |
| Hochsauerlandkreis | 46.6 | 22.3 | 12.1 | 7.2 | 3.2 | 3.9 | – | – | – | 4.7 | – |
| Heinsberg | 46.7 | 13.8 | 16.2 | 11.1 | 3.8 | 3.8 | – | – | 0.4 | 4.3 | – |
| Herford | 29.8 | 29.6 | 18.1 | 9.0 | 5.2 | 3.3 | – | 0.3 | 1.9 | 2.9 | – |
| Coesfeld | 47.1 | 15.6 | 9.1 | 16.0 | 3.5 | 3.7 | – | – | – | 3.2 | 1.8 |
| Euskirchen | 34.7 | 24.7 | 16.0 | 8.5 | 4.0 | 6.6 | 1.1 | – | – | 4.0 | 0.5 |
| Höxter | 44.8 | 15.6 | 14.5 | 8.8 | 3.3 | 3.5 | – | – | – | 9.5 | – |
| Olpe | 49.1 | 17.9 | 12.0 | 8.1 | 2.5 | 2.9 | 0.5 | – | – | 6.9 | – |

District administrators
| City | Elected administrator | Party/Ticket | Result | |
| City | Elected administrator | Party/Ticket | 1st round | 2nd round |
|---|---|---|---|---|
| Recklinghausen | Bodo Klimpel | CDU/FDP | 39.8% | 51.9% |
| Rhein-Sieg-Kreis | Sebastian Schuster | CDU | 45.0% | 56.2% |
| Aachen | Tim Grüttemeier | CDU | 44.3% | 62.5% |
| Mettmann | Bettina Warnecke | CDU | 57.9% | |
| Rhein-Erft-Kreis | Frank Rock | CDU | 45.9% | 62.9% |
| Wesel | Ingo Brohl | CDU/Grüne | 46.6% | 57.4% |
| Rhein-Kreis Neuss | Katharina-Bernhardine Reinhold | CDU | 45.9% | 62.8% |
| Steinfurt | Martin Sommer | Independent | 28.1% | 70.5% |
| Märkischer Kreis | Ralf Michael Schwarzkopf | CDU | 56.2% | |
| Unna | Mario Löhr | SPD | 58.7% | |
| Borken | Kai Zwicker | CDU | 62.5% | |
| Gütersloh | Ina Laukötter | CDU | 59.2% | |
| Lippe | Meinolf Haase | CDU | 39.8% | 55.6% |
| Ennepe-Ruhr-Kreis | Jan-Christoph Schaberick | SPD | 37.6% | 55.9% |
| Kleve | No election | | | |
| Minden-Lübbecke | No election | | | |
| Paderborn | Christoph Rüther | CDU | 53.8% | |
| Soest | Heinrich Frieling | CDU | 48.2% | 60.3% |
| Viersen | Bennet Gielen | CDU | 47.0% | 59.2% |
| Rheinisch-Bergischer Kreis | Arne von Boettischer | CDY | 40.8% | 56.9% |
| Warendorf | Olaf Gericke | CDU/FDP | 64.6% | |
| Siegen-Wittgenstein | Andreas Müller | SPD | 44.2% | 62.2% |
| Oberbergischer Kreis | Klaus Grootens | CDU/FDP | 43.2% | 61.7% |
| Düren | Ralf Nolten | CDU | 44.4% | 59.8% |
| Hochsauerlandkreis | Thomas Grosche | CDU | 63.2% | |
| Heinsberg | Stephan Pusch | CDU | 62.6% | |
| Herford | Mirco Schmidt | CDU | 43.6% | 53.8% |
| Coesfeld | Christian Schulze Pellengahr | CDU | 67.8% | |
| Euskirchen | Markus Ramers | SPD | 68.1% | |
| Höxter | Michael Stickeln | CDU | 64.5% | |
| Olpe | Theo Melcher | CDU | 60.8% | |

=== Ruhr Parliament ===
| Party | Votes | % | +/– | Seats | +/– |
|---|---|---|---|---|---|
| Social Democratic Party of Germany (SPD) | 584,829 | 28.2 | ▼1.1 | 29 | 0 |
| Christian Democratic Union of Germany (CDU) | 531,691 | 25.7 | ▼1.5 | 26 | ▼1 |
| Alternative for Germany (AfD) | 386,861 | 18.7 | ▲11.6 | 19 | ▲12 |
| Alliance 90/The Greens (GRÜNE) | 232,427 | 11.2 | ▼9.1 | 11 | ▼9 |
| The Left (LINKE) | 120,833 | 5.8 | ▲1.7 | 6 | ▲2 |
| Action Party for Animal Welfare (TIERSCHUTZ) | 45,819 | 2.2 | ▲0.2 | 0 | 0 |
| Free Democratic Party (FDP) | 44,150 | 2.1 | ▼1.6 | 0 | ▼4 |
| Sahra Wagenknecht Alliance (BSW) | 40,792 | 2.0 | New | 0 | New |
| Die PARTEI | 27,421 | 1.3 | ▼0.8 | 0 | 0 |
| Volt Germany (Volt) | 25,753 | 1.2 | ▲0.7 | 0 | 0 |
| Family Party of Germany (FAMILIE) | 8,932 | 0.4 | New | 0 | New |
| Voter Initiative NRW (WIN) | 6,589 | 0.3 | New | 0 | New |
| Team Todenhöfer | 5,518 | 0.3 | New | 0 | New |
| The Homeland (Heimat) | 2,938 | 0.1 | New | 0 | New |
| Antifascist, Independent, Progressive (AUF Ruhr) | 2,657 | 0.1 | New | 0 | New |
| GUT | 1,650 | 0.1 | New | 0 | New |
| Party of Humanists (PdH) | 1,595 | 0.1 | New | 0.1 | |
| Total | 1,070,455 | 100.0 | | 91 | 0 |
| Blank/invalid votes | 25,072 | 1.2 | | | |
| Registered voters/turnout | 3,876,360 | 54.1 | ▲7.0 | | |

== Opinion polls ==
=== Statewide (2025) ===
| Polling Firm | Polling date | CDU | SPD | GRÜNE | FDP | AfD | LINKE | BSW | Others |
|---|---|---|---|---|---|---|---|---|---|
| 2025 election | 14 September 2025 | 33.3 | 22.1 | 13.5 | 3.7 | 14.5 | 5.6 | 1.1 | 6.2 |
| INSA | 21 August 2025 | 36 | 23 | 10 | 4 | 15 | 6 | 3 | 3 |
| Forsa | 9 July 2025 | 32 | 22 | 14 | 3 | 14 | 6 | 2 | 7 |
| 2020 election | 13 September 2020 | 34.3 | 24.3 | 20 | 5.6 | 5 | 3.8 | — | 7 |
