= Pummerin =

Bell in St. Stephen's Cathedral in Vienna

Coordinates: 48°12′31″N 16°22′23″E

The Pummerin ("boomer") or Marienglocke ("Mary Bell") is the bourdon bell in the Stephansdom, St. Stephen's Cathedral, in Vienna.

== Old Pummerin (Josephinische Glocke) ==
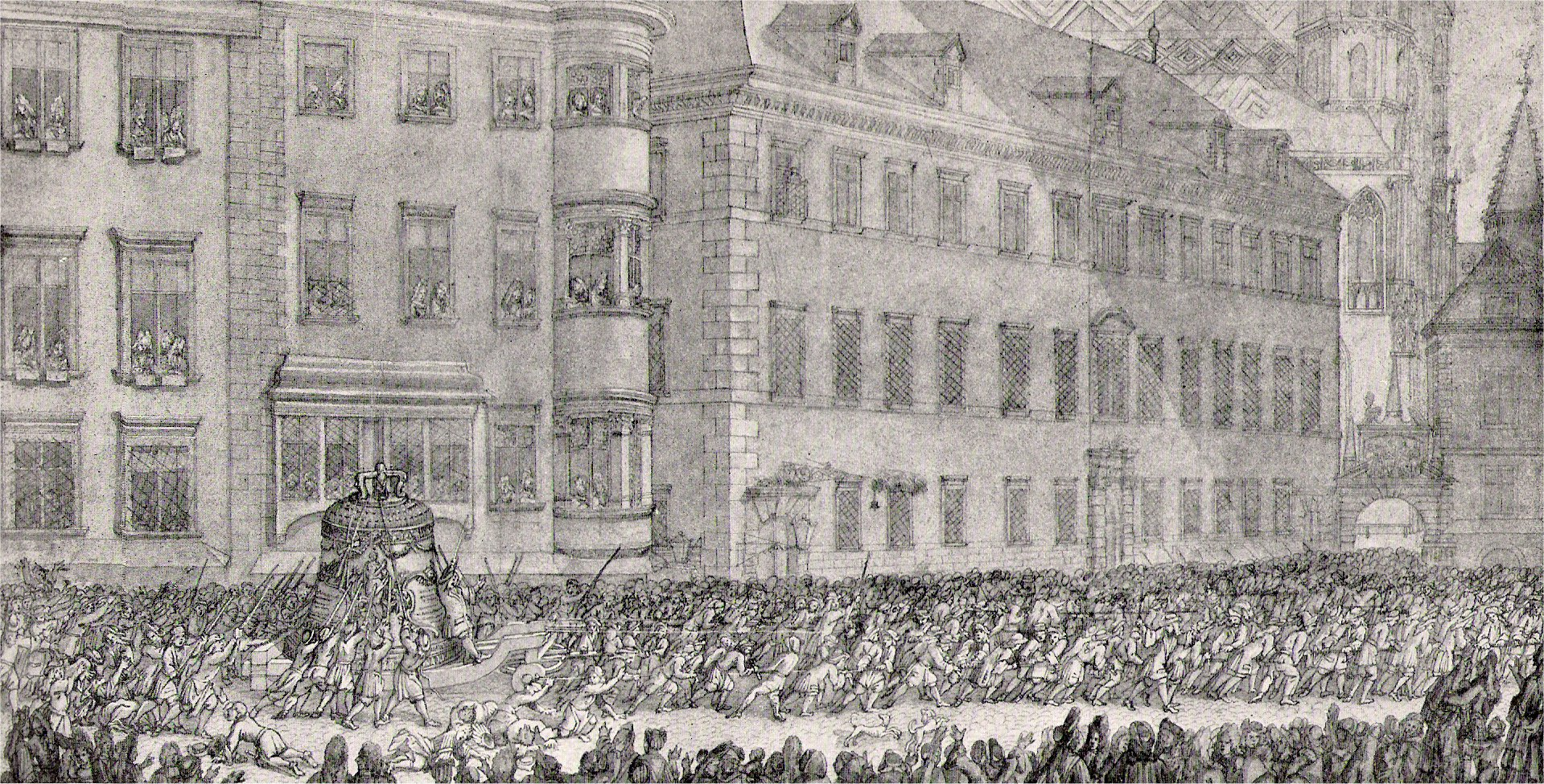
The Pummerin being transported to the cathedral in 1711

The Old Pummerin was originally cast in 1705 by bell founder Johann Achammer from 208 of the 300 cannons captured from the Muslim invaders in the Second Turkish Siege of Vienna.

The church bell cost 19,400 florins to cast. Images of Saint Joseph, St. Mary as the Immaculate Conception, and St. Leopold adorned the bell. These figures bore the arms of Bohemia, Hungary, the Holy Roman Empire, and Austria.

It had a diameter of 3.16 m (10.4 ft) (2 centimeters more than the New Pummerin), with a pitch of H (B natural).

On December 15, 1711, Bishop Franz Ferdinand Freiherr von Rummel consecrated the bell, which was then installed in the lower part of the high south tower of the cathedral. It rang for the first time on January 26, 1712 to mark the entry of Charles VI to Vienna from Frankfurt after his coronation as Emperor.

It took a quarter-hour for 16 men pulling on the bell rope to swing the heavy bell back-and-forth enough before the clapper would strike. But the forces from swinging the 18,161 kg bell endangered the structure of the beloved tower, so in 1878 Friedrich von Schmidt, the cathedral's architect, ordered that it be rung only by pulling its clapper, instead of being swung.

A photo of it in place shows how the Old Pummerin was then borne by wooden rails on which its lip rested. When it was to be rung, the rails had to be lowered away from it by turning jackscrews, and then eight men pulled on the two ropes attached to its heavy clapper. The Old Pummerin last sounded on Easter 1937. A fire caused by war-time looters of near-by shops destroyed the bell when its wooden cradle burned through and the bell crashed onto the stone floor of the south tower on April 12, 1945, along with Johannesglocke of the Northern tower, Zwölferin, and Neuerin of the south front tower. The other 6 bells of the north front tower survived the fire and still exist today. The other 11 bells of the Southern tower were cast in 1960, after the fire.

== New Pummerin ==
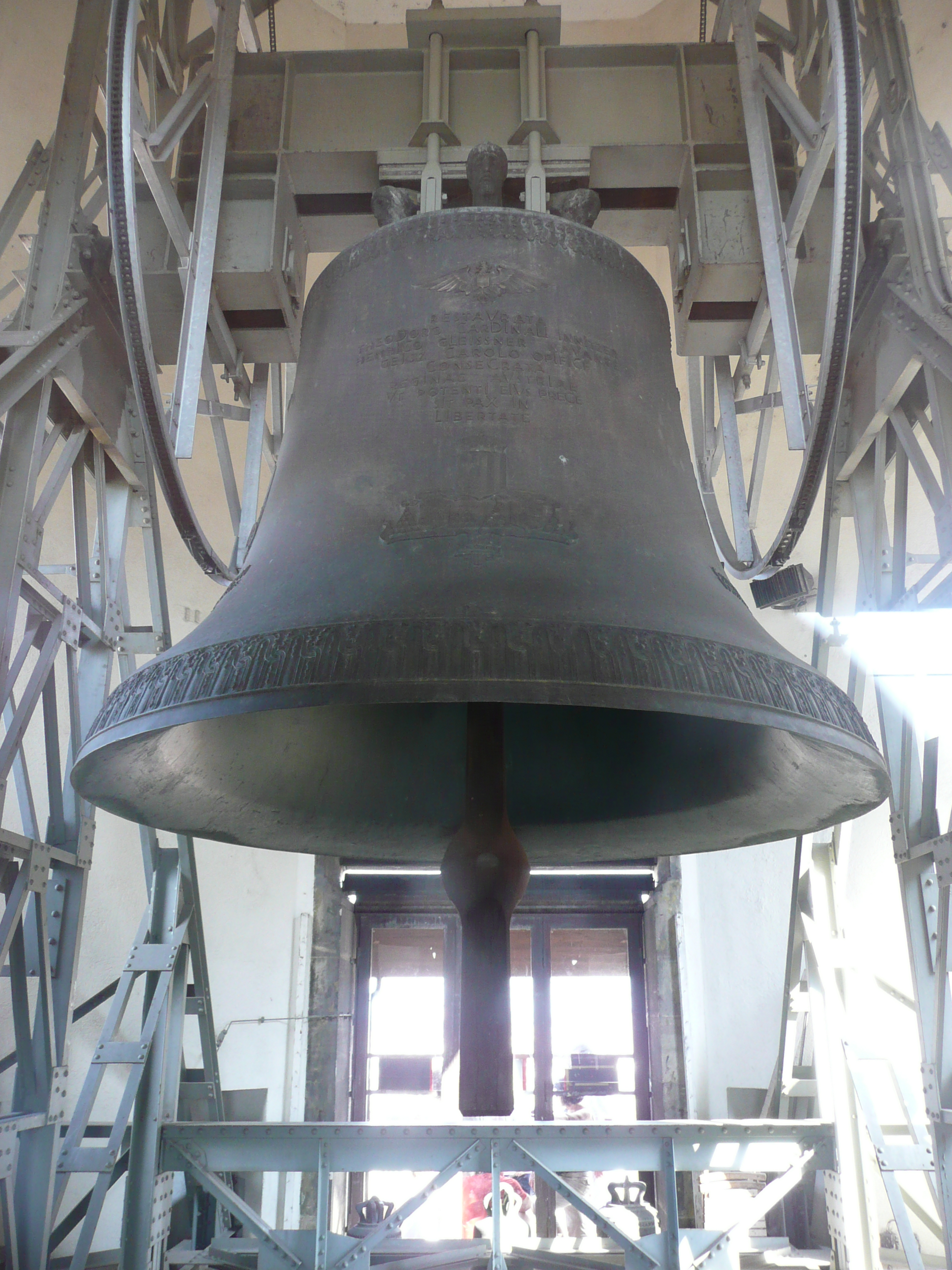
Pummerin is the third largest swinging bell in Europe

Pummerin bell

The new Pummerin (officially named for St. Mary) was a gift from the province of Upper Austria and was cast on 5 September 1951 in St. Florian, Upper Austria from the Old Pummerin's metal (supplemented by metal from some of the remaining captured Turkish cannons at Vienna's Heeresgeschichtliches Museum military museum).

At 20,130 kg (44,380 lb) (without the clapper which weighs 813 kg), the new Pummerin is the largest bell in Austria and the third largest swinging bell in Europe after the 23,500 kg (51,810 lb) Petersglocke in Cologne Cathedral and the 22,700 kg Maria Dolens in Rovereto, Italy. The new bell has a diameter of 3.14 metres (10.3 ft) and a height of 2.94 metres (9.6 ft).

The bell bears three reliefs showing the Blessed Virgin as the Immaculate Conception, a scene from the Ottoman siege of Vienna (1683), and a scene of the conflagration in 1945. Like the Old Pummerin, the heads of Turks adorn the brackets at the top, and an interlocking square chain design decorates the bottom rim.

It arrived in Vienna on 26 April 1952 and was consecrated by Cardinal Theodor Innitzer that same day. It rang for the first time the next day at a Pontifical High Mass, but from the cathedral's building yard where it remained until its new home was completed.

The cathedral authorities wanted the main bell to again be a traditional swinging bell, so it was decided to design the new bell this way, and (because its old home in the south tower had already been proven too vulnerable) to hang it in the shorter, but sturdier, north tower. Repair of the landmark south tower had been given higher priority, so the north tower was not ready to receive its new tenant until five years later. The new Pummerin was driven through the Giant's Door on the west facade and installed on a steel structure within the north tower on 5 October 1957.

=== Ringing schedule ===
The Pummerin sounds on only a few special occasions such as high Catholic holidays such as Easter, Pentecost, Feast of Corpus Christi, Christmas Eve, and Saint Stephen's Day (High Patron of the Church - Dec 26th); state funerals, and at the beginning of the New Year, when it is broadcast on ORF, followed by The Blue Danube Waltz. At New Year's in the city it is hard to hear the bells due to the noise from the fireworks. On All Souls' Day (2 November) it rings to commemorate the fallen in World War II. On the 23rd of April it rings to celebrate the consecration of St. Stephens. The bell has almost never rung with the peal of 11 bells in the South tower. Full peal can be heard here: https://www.youtube.com/watch?v=c151mIKhXGE

Date/Day	Time (Beginning)	Celebration
1 January	00:00	Ring in the New Year
Holy Saturday	≈ 23:00	Holy Saturday
Easter Sunday	≈ btw. 11:50 and 12:10	Resurrection of Christ
23 April	≈ btw. 19:20 and 19:30	Church Anniversary
Pentecost	≈ btw. 11:45 and 12:00	Feast of Pentecost
Feast of Corpus Christi	≈ 09:30	Beginning of the procession
Feast of Corpus Christi	≈ 11:30	after Mass
26 October	≈ 19:00	Celebration of the Nation, after evening Mass (anniversary of the Declaration of Neutrality)
2 November	≈ 17:45	All Soul's Day
24 December	23:55	Christmas Mass
26 December	≈ btw. 11:50 and 12:10	Saint Stephen's Day

To minimize excess vibrations of the supporting structure, since 2003 the bell's electrical swinging mechanism has been carefully controlled by a computer.

An elevator takes visitors up the 68 metres (223 ft) to the bell.
