= Stephan Letter =

German serial killer (born 1978)

- Born: 17 September 1978 (age 48); Herdecke, North Rhine-Westphalia, West Germany
- Convictions: Murder (12 counts) manslaughter (15 counts); Killing on demand
- Penalty: Life imprisonment

Details
- Victims: 28 convicted, 29+ total
- Span of crimes: January 2003 – July 2004
- Country: Germany
- Date apprehended: 29 July 2004
- Imprisoned at: Straubing

Stephan Letter (born 17 September 1978) is a German serial killer and former nurse responsible for the murder of at least 29 patients while he worked at a hospital in Sonthofen, Bavaria, between January 2003 and July 2004. His murders were described as the largest number of killings in Germany since the Second World War, until the discovery of Niels Högel's crimes.

== Biography ==
Letter was a nurse at a hospital that treated a large elderly population. During his employment from January 2003 to July 2004, a pattern of more than 80 deaths occurred on his shifts. Officials exhumed the bodies of more than 40 patients, but another 38 had already been cremated. Letter became a suspect after officials learned that large quantities of drugs, including the paralytic drug Lysthenon, had gone missing from the hospital. Unsealed medication vials were found in Letter's apartment.

In February 2006, Letter was brought to trial for the deaths of 29 patients. His charges included 16 counts of murder, 12 counts of manslaughter and one count of killing on request. Most of the patients were older than 75, but they ranged in age from 40 to 94. Letter also reportedly gave an inappropriate injection to a 22-year-old soldier with minor injuries from a fall; she lost consciousness but recovered. Letter confessed to some of the killings but insisted that he had acted out of sympathy and a desire to end the suffering of sick patients. However, the prosecution indicated that Letter was not the assigned nurse for some of the patients and that some of them were in stable condition and were due to be released from the hospital. In November, Letter was found guilty of 12 counts of murder, 15 counts of manslaughter and 1 count of killing on demand. He was sentenced to life in prison that same month. He is imprisoned in Straubing.

Letter's killings have been characterized as the worst killing spree in Germany since the Second World War.

== See also ==
- Serial killers with health related professions
- List of serial killers by number of victims
