= Dörken MKS-Systeme =

Dörken MKS-Systeme (Dörken MKS-Systeme GmbH & Co. KG)) is an international specialty chemical company headquartered in Herdecke, Germany. It is the European market leader for micro-layer corrosion protection systems and is represented in more than 150 countries worldwide.

== History ==
The Dörken MKS-Systeme GmbH & Co. KG was founded in 1980 in Herdecke. The start was with the production and distribution of a micro-layer corrosion protection system for a high-performance but heavy metal-free surface protection, from the beginning without the carcinogenic Chromium VI. Originally, small parts were coated with Zinc flake coating and organic topcoats.

Dörken MKS-Systeme has always been exclusively products in Herdecke. Since the year 2000, Dörken MKS started to open up local offices. Today, there are many offices in the U.S., China, South Korea, and locally working product managers in most European countries as well as in India, Taiwan and Brazil. Since 2002, Dörken MKS-Systeme GmbH & Co. KG is an independent business unit of Ewald Dörken AG. In the year 2010, Dörken has acquired a small company specialized in surface treatment, the LP-Oberflächntechnik GmbH (Schalksmüle).

== Products ==
Zinc flake coatings Zinc flake coating normally consist of a basecoat and topcoat, this is called a modular system.

== Basecoats ==
A basecoat determines the corrosion protection properties of the system and is responsible for cathodic protection. The inorganic basecoats are made of zinc flakes and protect parts with very thin – usually between 8-12 μm. The less noble zinc scarifies itself, and this is called cathodic protection. Due to this phenomenon the more noble steel is protected from for many parts and components, specially designed for fasteners in the automotive-, wind-, electrical-, construction- and aviation industry.

== Topcoats ==
A topcoat complements the properties of the basecoat and influences the chemical/ mechanical resistance of the whole system. They can be organic or inorganic, and offer the ideal seals for the basecoat. The resistance to liquids, chemicals or mechanical stress can be increased, but above all they allow a controlled coefficient of friction. The topcoat is available in many different colors.

== Other products ==
In addition to the most commonly used basecoat (DELTA®-TONE)) and topcoat (DELTA®-SEAL), there are other products of Dörken MKS e.g. DELTA-LUBE ® 10, which is a lubrication with multifunctional properties that match the basecoats.

Moreover, the product DELTACOLL® 80 was developed which is suitable as a top coat especially for electroplated substrates.

== Markets ==
The markets of Dörken MKS are mainly the Automotive industry and wind energy industry, others are electrical, Construction industry and aviation industry.

Dörken MKS is at the beginning of the value chain. At first there are the licensed coating companies and manufacturers of components (Tiers) and at the end are the end users (OEM), such as automobile manufacturers Nevertheless, there is a common interaction between all participants of the value chain, a products have to be developed to fulfill the needs of all players.
