= Petersglocke =

Biggest bell in Cologne Cathedral

Coordinates: 50.9411°N 6.9573°E

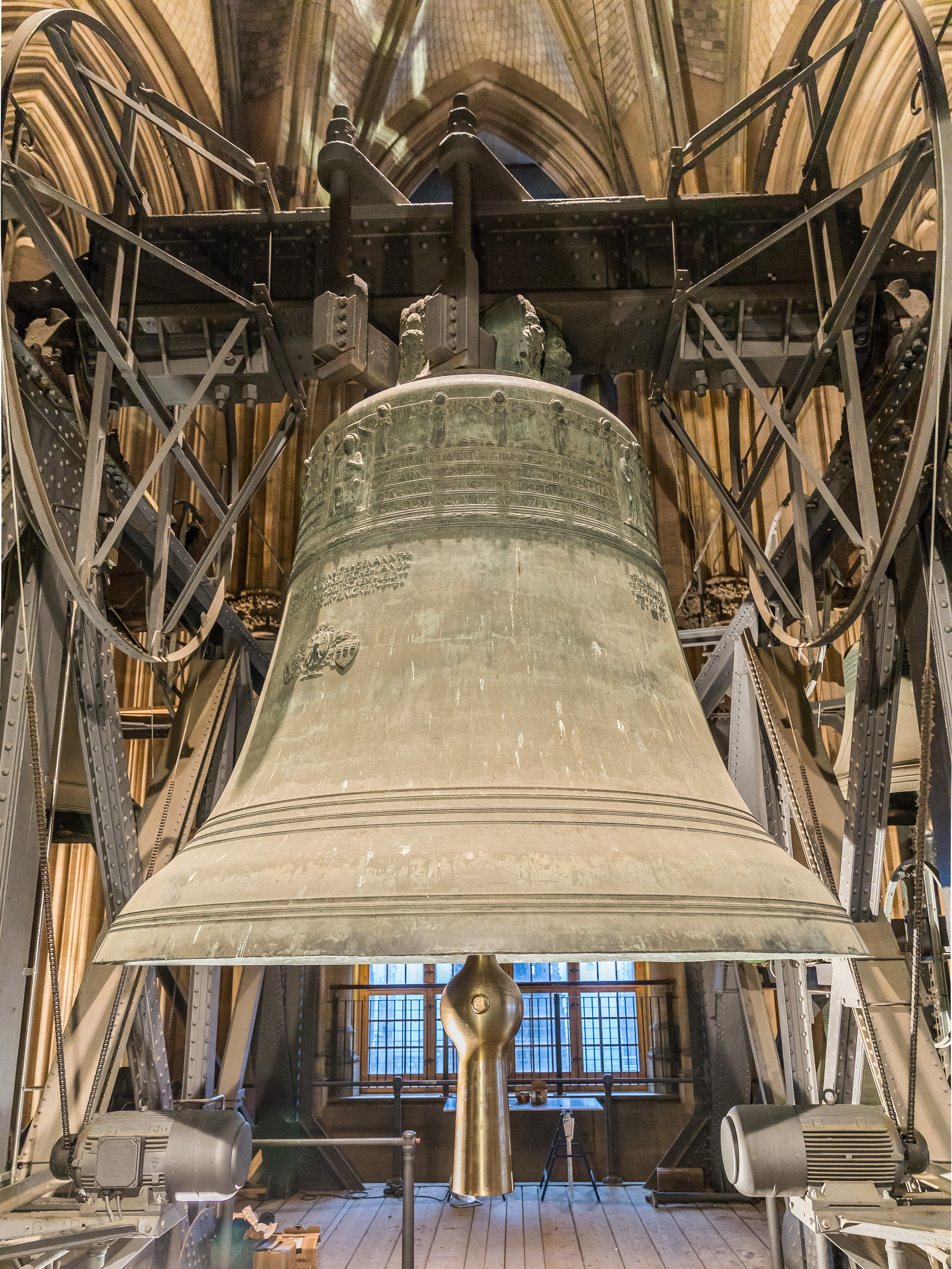
Petersglocke with new clapper and ringing engines

Sound of the bell

Trial ringing on 30 October 2018 with new clapper suspension

Petersglocke (pronounced [ˈpeːtɐsˌɡlɔkə]; English: "[Saint] Peter's bell"), commonly referred to as Dicker Pitter (German: [ˈdɪkɐ ˈpɪtɐ]; Kölsch: de Decke Pitter or de Dekke Pitter, pronounced [də ˌdêkə ˈpɪ̂tɐ], i.e. "Fat/Big Peter"), is the bourdon bell of Cologne Cathedral. It was cast in 1923 by Heinrich Ulrich in Apolda and hangs in the belfry of the south tower. With a weight of approximately 24,000 kilograms (53,000 lb), a clapper weighing about 700 kilograms (1,500 lb) and a diameter of 322 centimetres (10 ft 7 in), it is the second largest (horizontally mounted) freely swinging ringable bell in the world, after the bell of the People's Salvation Cathedral in Bucharest, Romania.

The bell is named after Saint Peter, one of Jesus's twelve apostles.

== Inscription ==
=== Dedicatory inscription ===
- Im Jahre 1922 nach Christi Geburt, 600 Jahre nach der Domweihe, unter der Regierung des Papstes Pius XI, des Erzbischofs Karl Joseph Kardinal Schulte, unter der Amtsführung des Dompropstes Arnold Middendorf, des Domdechanten und Weihbischofs Petrus Lausberg, der Domkapitulare Winand Blank, Arnold Steffens, Joseph Romunde, Karl Cohen, Joseph Vogt, Adolf Ott, Friedrich Graf Spee, Otto Paschen, Christian Berrenrath, Joseph Stoffels.
- Ich wurde zu Apolda vom Meister Heinrich Ulrich gegossen. Die Mittel gaben das Deutsche Reich, der Preußische Staat und vaterländisch gesinnte Bürger Kölns.

=== Another inscription ===
- O König der Herrlichkeit, komm Christus mit Frieden.
- St. Gereon, bitt für uns.
- St. Ursula, bitt für uns.
- St. Peter bin ich genannt, schütze das deutsche Land, geboren aus deutschem Leid, ruf ich zur Einigkeit.

== The sound of the Petersglocke ==
Within Cologne Cathedral's bell system, the Petersglocke stands as a unique entity. Cast in 1923 by K. Richard Heinrich Ulrich, Fa. Gebr. Ulrich of Erfurt, Thuringia, it maintains ideal overall performance compared to other C-major bronze bells. Contemporary research confirms its strike ring thickness remains within a reasonable diameter ratio. Its design was modeled after the measured Erfurter Gloriosa.

Regarding Klangaufbau, the Petersglocke exhibits no extreme deviations in the Prinzipaltonbereich compared to other C-glocken, except for es°+3 and g°-14 = ges°+2. Unfortunately, the Unterton's Abklingdauer is now suboptimal (approximately 170 seconds).

Its rich mixture range lends the bell considerable volume. Nevertheless, it struggles to compete with the two immediately higher bells in the plenum. A notable feature is the presence of a secondary nominal e°-2, a phenomenon similar to the Dreikönigenglocke, creating the illusion of a major octave ripple. In reality, the Petersglocke should be classified as a minor octave ripple. Interestingly, in the acceptance report dated June 4, 1923, the then-cathedral canon and cathedral choirmaster Prof. Dr. Carl Cohen (1851–1938), serving as bell expert, still referred to it as a major-key bell.

As an individual bell, the Petersglocke has always been widely cherished. In 1956, it underwent welding repairs in the South Tower by the Nördlingen bell workshop Hans Lachenmeyer senior (1898–1977) and junior (*1936).

== History ==
When the bell was cast in 1923, the bell-founder refused to take German marks as a payment because of the hyper-inflation. Instead the Cathedral Chapter paid 5,000 US dollars. The predecessor of the bell was the "Emperor's Bell" (orig. German: Kaiserglocke) or Gloriosa ("Glorious") of 1873 which at 27,180 kilograms (59,920 lb) was even heavier than the St. Peter's bell. In 1918 it was melted down, because of the poor sound quality and the inadequate tone. Its metal was used for war purposes. During its thirty-year life it had regularly been put out of service to attempt to fix the inappropriate sound. Because of this the bell was nicknamed Große Schweigerin, or "big silence".

=== History Detail ===
==== Spring 1918 ====
The Cologne Metropolitan Chapter melted down the Kaiserglocke in Cologne Cathedral as a war sacrifice, receiving no state compensation. Domkapellmeister Prof. Dr. Karl Hubert Cohen subsequently contacted the Glockengießerei Gebr. Ulrich foundry in Apolda in advance to prepare for future recasting.

==== Early January 1922 ====
Banker Heinrich von Stein and Christian Eckert jointly planned the bell's recasting, preparing to submit a request to the Reich Government for bell metal.

==== January 7, 1922 ====
Stein mailed Eckert a list of intended signatories for the petition, along with a draft proposal.

==== January 10, 1922 ====
The invitation card was printed, calling on citizens to sign a petition to the Reich Chancellor requesting metal for casting a new German bell to replace the imperial bell lost during the war.

==== January 15–21, 1922 ====
The petition (Eingabe) was displayed at Kölner Margaretenkloster 3 for citizens to sign in support. Ultimately, signatures from 68 prominent figures were collected.

==== March 13, 1922 ====
A meeting at Bankhaus Stein confirmed funding for the bell metal (approximately 1.2 million Mark) and 2000kg of material. Glockengießerei Gebr. Ulrich in Apolda was formally commissioned for casting.

==== May 5, 1923 ====
The Petersglocke was successfully cast in Apolda under the supervision of Master Heinrich Ulrich.

==== October 15, 1924 ====
Dompropst Middendorf dispatched representatives to notify Christian Eckert of a meeting to discuss the transportation of the Petersglocke.

==== October 20, 1924 ====
A meeting convened in the Kapitelssaal arranged specific measures for transporting the Petersglocke from Apolda back to Cologne.

==== November 30, 1924 ====
The Petersglocke was formally consecrated at Cologne Cathedral, becoming the new main bell. Its inscription records funding from the German Reich, the Prussian State, and the citizens of Cologne.

==== February 1, 1926, at midnight ====
The Petersglocke rang out, announcing the liberation of the Cologne occupation zone, thus acquiring commemorative significance.

==== 1951 ====
In 1951, a 110 centimetres (3.6 ft) long crack appeared on the bell. It was welded in 1956 by the company Lachenmeyer from Nördlingen. After repairs, the bell received a new, lighter clapper (approx. 600 kilograms [1,300 lb]), and it was rotated approximately 20 degrees so that the clapper did not strike the damaged area.

==== January 6, 2011 ====
On 6 January, 2011, the clapper broke and dropped on the floor below. The four earthquake sensors in the cathedral registered it. As it could not be repaired, a new one was cast and was installed in December of the same year. It was later discovered that the accident happened because the clapper had not been correctly installed in the 1950s, thus increasing wear, which consequently led to material degradation.

The new clapper weighs approx. 600 kilograms (1,300 lb) and is 3.20 metres (10 ft 6 in) long. It was installed on December 2, 2011, and was first rung on 7 December 2011. The workers installed two new electric ringing engines (500 rpm), which harmonized with the new clapper. The old engines worked with 750 rpm.

In 2016, it was discovered that uneven striking of the clapper meant that the "Dicke Pitter" was no longer emitting its customary sound. The Cologne University of Applied Sciences and the cathedral construction authority developed a new mount. In addition, a new corrosion protection product was developed by Dörken MKS-Systeme.

==== May 5, 2023 ====
The most famous instrument of the Cologne Cathedral bells is the Petersglocke, which celebrates its 100th birthday on this day and in whose honor this concert is being held. Analogous to the expression “Symphony of the Aachen Cathedral Bells” coined by Jakob Schaeben (music director and bell expert of the dioceses of Cologne, Aachen and Essen), one could also speak of the “Symphony of the Cologne Cathedral Bells.” Today's bell concert is inspired by this as a symphony in six movements, each of which relates to the history of Cologne Cathedral or presents individual combinations from the ringing order throughout the church year, before all twelve cathedral bells ring together in the finale, bringing the symphony to a grand conclusion.

== Ringing times ==
The bell is only rung on special occasions and on solemnities. The declaration or death of an Archbishop of Cologne or of a Pope, as well as the investiture of a new archbishop also warrant tolling St. Peter. All bells of the cathedral rang on the eve of 28 March 1936, a Friedensappell ("peace appeal") of Hitler, which he made in Cologne due to the Reichstag elections. Likewise, the St. Petersglocke declared the end of World War II above the ruins of the city of Cologne in 1945, and in 1990 the reunification of Germany. As a rule, St. Petersglocke rings solo for ten minutes before all the others, which join in accordance with the general ringing ordinance. However, not all South Tower bells will be rung every time. For the Feast of the Immaculate Conception bells 1–6 are rung and for the Christmas Eve Vigil bells 1–3.

Date/Day	Time	Occasion
7 December	19:30	Pre-Ringing for the Solemnity of the Immaculate Conception of the Blessed Virgin Mary
8 December	09:35	Solemnity of the Immaculate Conception of the Blessed Virgin Mary (Sundays)
8 December	18:05	Solemnity of the Immaculate Conception of the Blessed Virgin Mary (Weekdays)
24 December	19:15	Pre-Ringing for the Solemnity of the Nativity of the Lord on Christmas Eve
24 December	23:05	Christmas Vigil on Christmas Eve (together with the Pretiosa and Speciosa)
25 December	09:35	Christmas Day
1 January	00:00	Pre-Ringing for the new Year (Full chimes)
5 January	19:30	Pre-Ringing for the Solemnity of the Epiphany of the Lord
6 January	09:35	Epiphany of the Lord/Three Kings' Day
Holy Saturday	≈23:15	Glory of Easter for the Easter Vigil (Full chimes)
Easter Sunday	09:35	Resurrection of the Lord
Eve of Ascension Day	19:30	Pre-Ringing for Ascension Day
Ascension Day	09:35	Solemnity of the Ascension of the Lord
Pentecost Eve	19:30	Pre-Ringing for the Solemnity of Pentecost
Pentecost	09:35	Solemnity of Pentecost
Eve of Corpus Christi	19:30	Pre-Ringing for the Solemnity of Corpus Christi
Corpus Christi	09:35	Solemnity of Corpus Christi
Corpus Christi	Procession and Entrance of the Blessed Sacrament	Solemnity of Corpus Christi (rung solo)
28 June	19:30	Pre-Ringing for the High/Patronage Feast of St. Peter and Paul
29 June	09:35	High/Patronage Feast of St. Peter and Paul (Sunday)
29 June	18:05	High/Patronage Feast of St. Peter and Paul (Weekdays)
31 October	19:30	Pre-Ringing on All Hallows Eve
1 November	09:35	All Hallows/All Saints' Day

== Gallery ==
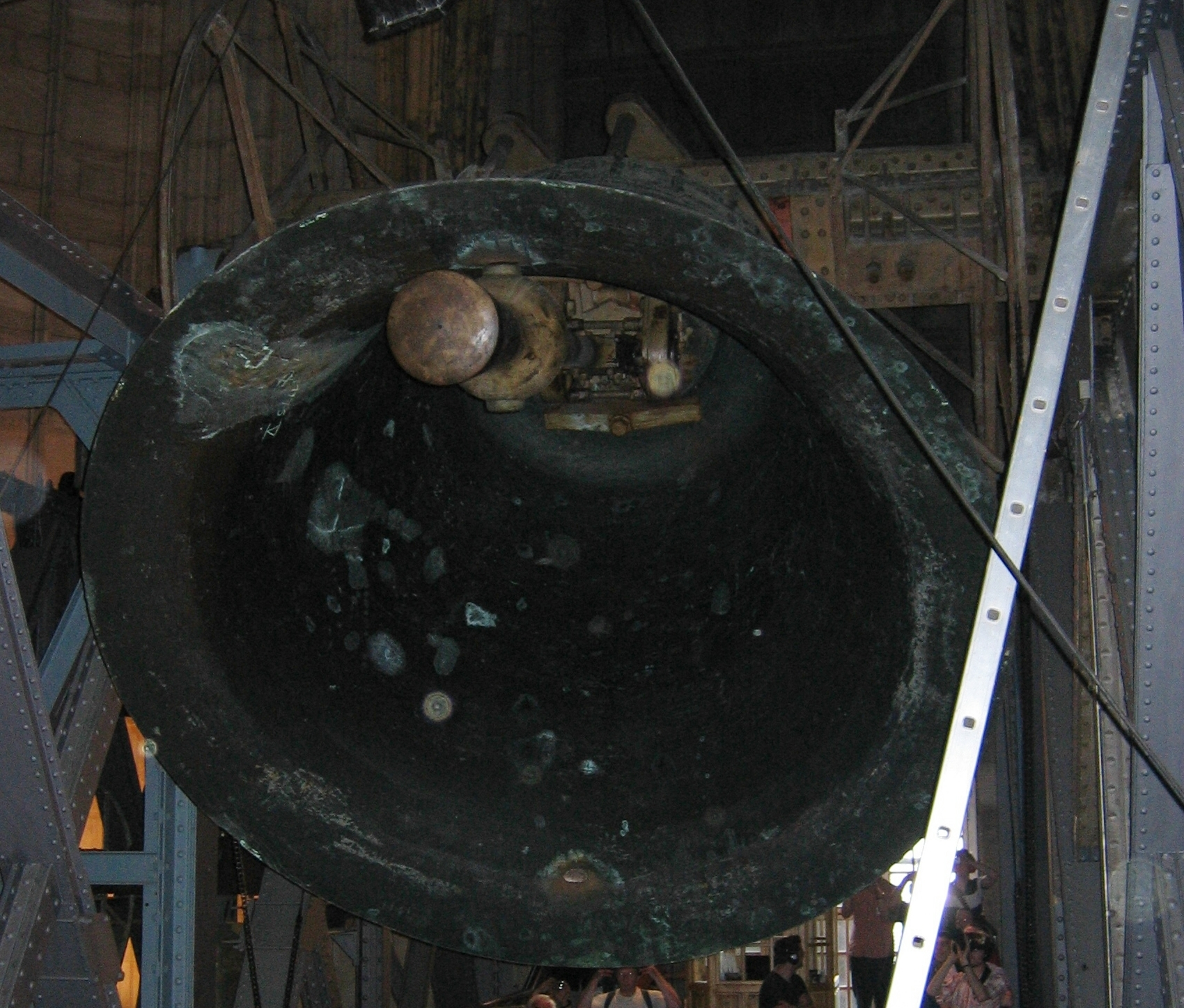
On this image the damaged area from the crack can be seen to the left of the clapper

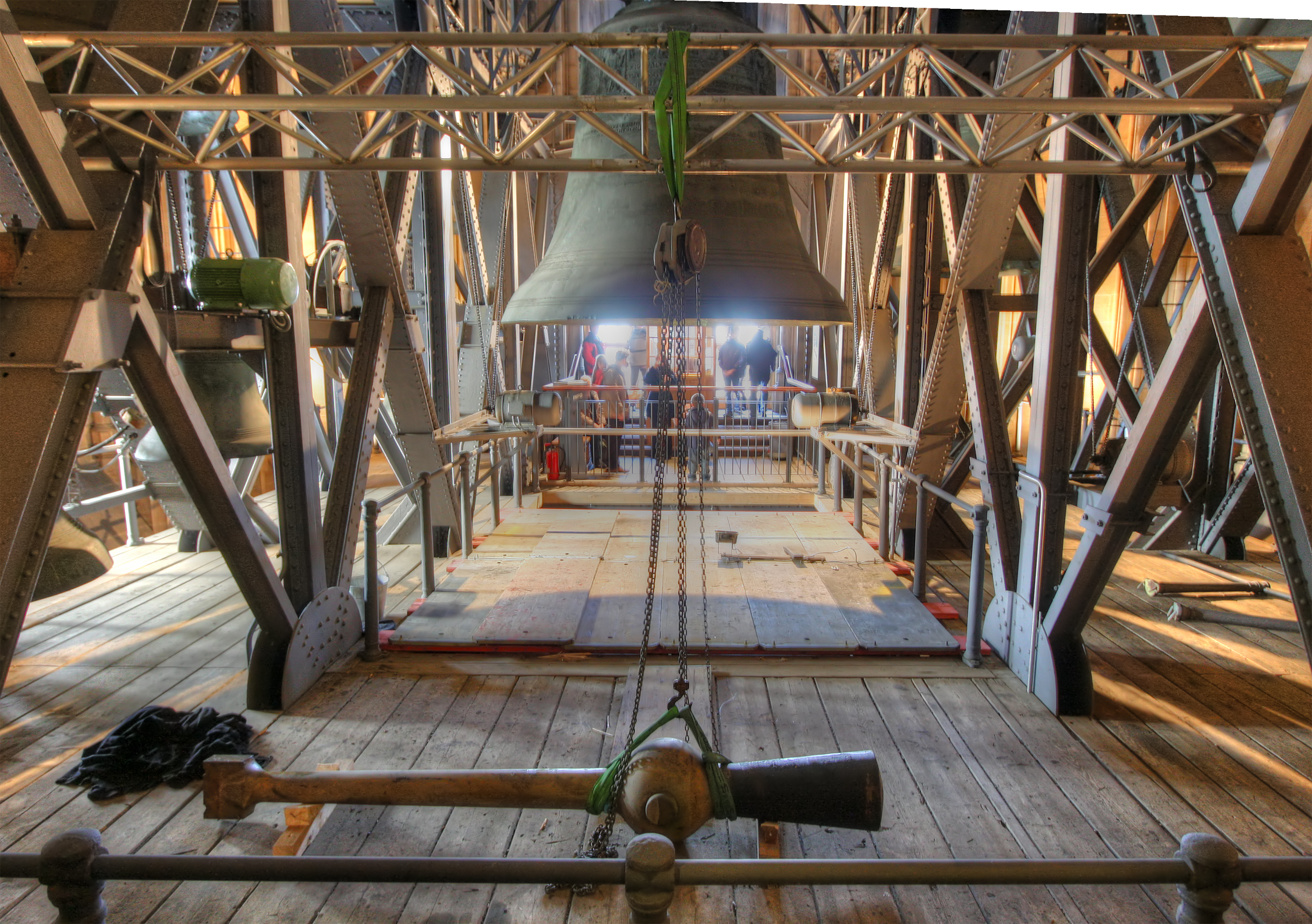
The Peter's bell with the broken clapper

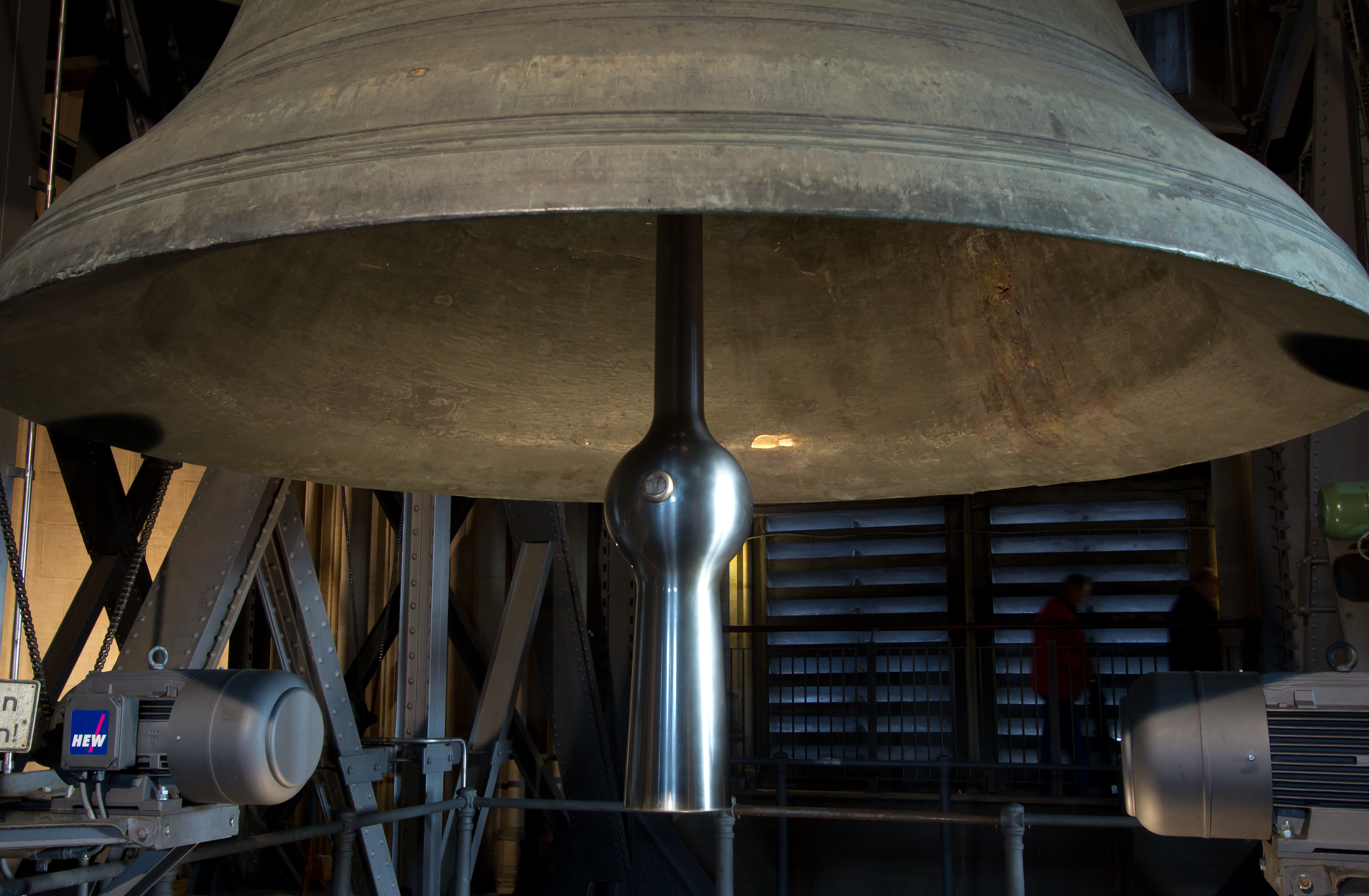
The Peter's bell with the new clapper

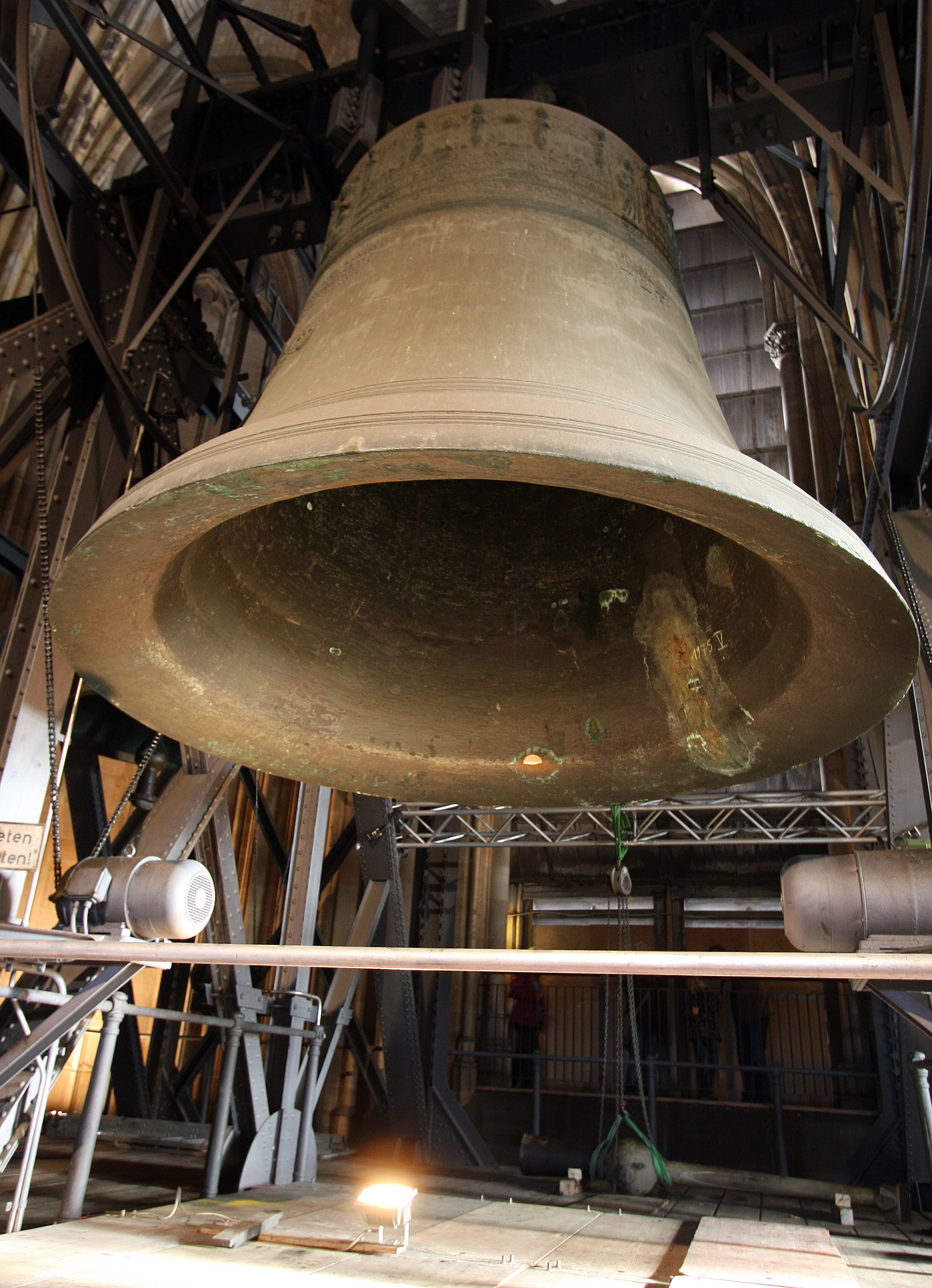
The Peter's Bell without a clapper
