= Zinc flake coating =

Non-electrolytically applied coating

Zinc flake coatings are non-electrolytically applied coatings, which provide good protection against corrosion. These coatings consist of a mixture of zinc and aluminium flakes, which are bonded together by an inorganic matrix.

The specifications for zinc flake coatings are defined in international standard ISO 10683 and also in European standard EN 13858. ISO 10683 sets out the requirements for zinc flake coatings for threaded fasteners and EN 13858 describes the requirements for zinc flake coatings for fasteners with no thread and for other parts as well. There are three groups of zinc flake coatings:

- Zinc flake coatings containing Cr(VI) (hexavalent chromium): surfaces containing Cr(VI) provide greater anti-corrosion protection with a thinner coating, but Cr(VI) is carcinogenic and poses a potential risk to the environment. Zinc flake coatings containing Cr(VI) are no longer available in Europe since June 2017.
- Solvent-based Cr(VI)-free zinc flake coatings.
- Water-based Cr(VI)-free zinc flake coatings.

Cr(VI)-free coatings are more environmentally friendly than surfaces with a Cr(VI) content. No zinc flake coatings used in the automotive industry nowadays contain this substance. Various manufacturers, such as car companies and their suppliers, have produced their own specifications and supply rules in order to define the requirements for these coating systems.

Zinc flake coating is a generic term for the coating technology and this is marketed by the different suppliers under their respective brand names.

== History ==
Because electrolytically zinc-plated surfaces provide comparatively little corrosion protection, and in the case of galvanic zinc coatings on high-strength steel (e.g. category 10.9 and 12.9 high-strength bolts) there is a risk of hydrogen embrittlement, the industry needed a better corrosion protection system. High-strength steel parts (such as bolts of strength category > 10.9 and nuts of > 9) and components with tensile strength of > 1000 N/mm^{2} or > 320 HV are susceptible to hydrogen embrittlement. Galvanic coating processes and pickling with acids have a major influence on the development of hydrogen-induced brittle fractures.

In the 1970s, a new coating system was developed in the United States: zinc flake coating (patent number 1376067). By virtue of a thin coat thickness of typically 8-12 μm this system produced a high level of protection against corrosion and made it possible to avoid hydrogen embrittlement.

In the 1980s and 1990s, the use of these coating systems spread, e.g. within the automotive industry. This industry needs coating systems offering a high level of corrosion resistance. As zinc flake coatings do not create any hydrogen in the process, they were used for critical applications as an alternative to electroplating.

== Characteristics ==
Today, these are the preferred coatings for fasteners and other parts in the automotive industry, as they offer various advantages:

- Good appearance (colouring)
- Very good protection against corrosion (240 - 1,500 hours, depending on specification and coating thickness)
- Resistant to extreme temperatures
- Good chemical resistance
- Environmentally friendly
- Good friction characteristics (on bolts and nuts)
- No warm-loosening torque
- No risk for high-strength fasteners of any hydrogen embrittlement
- Electric conductivity
- Other assembly properties

The requirements of the automotive industry have set new objectives. Corrosion protection and appearance are no longer the only and most important characteristics.

In addition to the applications in the automotive industry, these coating systems are also found in wind power systems, the construction industry, electrical equipment (plant construction), trucks and other markets as well. Zinc flake coatings create what is known as cathodic protection: the less noble zinc 'sacrifices' itself in order to protect the underlying metal. Steel can be protected in this way. The coating thickness is often between 5 μm and 15 μm, with thicker layers also possible where there are special requirements. When coating metric threaded parts it is necessary to keep to the tolerances defined in ISO 965 so that the bolt's thread does not get gummed up and the coefficient of friction can be set accordingly. Hot-dip galvanised fasteners with a typical coating thickness of 80-200 μm have to be grooved again retrospectively in order to expose the thread.

In contrast to paints where the risk of sub-surface corrosion creep exists, this phenomenon is avoided through the sacrificial effect of the zinc. In salt spray tests zinc flake coatings demonstrate better protection against corrosion than a typical galvanic zinc coating, which in the tests (generally run in accordance with ISO 9227) often achieve only 96 to 200 hours.

== Coating technique ==
The material for the zinc flake coatings gets supplied in liquid form and needs to be prepared to the desired conditions before application. The viscosity, temperature and stirring time prior to application all play an important role here. The material can be applied using the following application techniques:

- Spraying. The coating material is applied to the parts' surface using a spray gun. This can be done manually or in a fully automated spraying facility (this process is used for larger or unwieldy parts, also termed rack parts, as they are brought into the coating process on a rack).
- Dip-spinning. The parts get loaded into a basket. The coating is done by dipping the basket into a container filled with the prepared coating material. After the dipping, the basket gets spun around in order to remove the residue of the coating material (this process is used for smaller high-volume / bulk parts, also called drum parts).
- Rack-mounted dip-spinning. Parts that are positioned or otherwise fixed in baskets are dipped, spun and passed through the furnace with the rack.
- Dip-drain coating. Dipping the part into the coating material and drawing it out in a set manner enables the inside and outside of, for example, pipes to be coated in a single process. The parts should, however, have sufficient openings that the material can drain away again, otherwise flawless coating is not possible, as the accumulations of the material cause air bubbles to form.

Prior to coating, the parts' surface needs to be pre-treated. Pickling with acids (e.g. sulfuric or hydrochloric acid) produces atomic hydrogen and can penetrate into the steel structure and make it brittle. In order to avoid pickling procedures, other pre-treatment processes are required. The typical cleaning processes are removal with an alkaline aqueous solution and then blasting with very small steel balls (shot). Cleaning solutions remove grease, oil and dirt from the metal surface. Blasting removes scaling and rust through the mechanical action of the steel balls, which are fired at the parts inside a chamber using a turbine. Neither process produces any hydrogen, so there is no danger of any hydrogen embrittlement when pre-treating high-strength steels in this way.

After the pre-treatment then comes the coating process. Mounted on a rack the parts get sprayed with the zinc flake material (spraying process) or, placed inside a container, they get dipped and spun (dip-spinning). The coating material forms a liquid, uniform layer on the parts' surface. In order to develop the excellent properties of zinc flake coatings, an annealing process is required.

The coated parts have to be cured inside an oven at a controlled temperature for a set period. This temperature/time configuration is dependent on the coating material and the product manufacturer, as each manufacturer of zinc flake products has its patented formula. Typical curing temperatures are 200 °C, 240 °C and 320 °C. After the curing, a uniform, thin, firmly bonded and dry layer is produced.

== Applications ==
Zinc flake coatings are used as cathodic protective layers against corrosion all over the world in the automotive and construction industries. Combined with cured, thin, organic or inorganic coatings, these can also provide colour (black, silver, green, blue, etc.), chemical resistance, low electrical conductivity (due to the influence of the organic layer) and assembly properties. If required, re-lubrication or a thread lock (patch) is also possible.

Steel parts that can be coated with zinc flake coatings include, for example, bolts, nuts, springs, panels and structural parts.

In the case of wind turbines these coatings are frequently used for threaded fastening elements. Zinc flake coatings are particularly well suited to high-strength bolts (strength category 10.9 and above), high-strength nuts (strength category 10 and above) and structural parts with tensile strength of > 1000 N/mm^{2} or > 320 HV because hydrogen embrittlement is avoided.

== Sources ==
- ISO International Organization for Standardization. ISO 10683 Fasteners – Non-electrolytically applied zinc flake coatings, 2000
- CEN Comité Européen de Normalisation. EN 13858 Corrosion protection of metals. Non-electrolytically applied zinc flake coatings on iron or steel components
- Qualicor – European Quality Label Association. Vademecum – Non-electrolytically applied zinc flake coatings
- ISO International Organisation for Norms. ISO 9227 - Salt Spray Test
