= Iris Stalzer =

German politician

Mayor of Herdecke
- Incumbent
- Assumed office 1 November 2025
- Preceded by: Katja Strauss-Köster

Personal details
- Born: 1968 (age 57–58) Frankfurt am Main, West Germany
- Party: Social Democratic Party of Germany (since 2014)
- Other political affiliations: Alliance 90/The Greens (until 2014)

Ute Iris Stalzer (born 1968) is a German politician of the Social Democratic Party (SPD). She is the mayor of Herdecke in the south-eastern Ruhr region.

== Biography ==
Stalzer grew up in Herdecke as the daughter of a steelworker. She studied law and works as a specialist lawyer for labor law in Herdecke.

Until 2020, Stalzer was a member of the Herdecke city council, for Alliance 90/The Greens until she left the party at the end of 2014.

She later joined the SPD. In the 2025 local elections, Stalzer was elected mayor of Herdecke. She prevailed in the runoff election on 28 September 2025, with 52.2% (first round: 42.5%) of the vote against Fabian Haas (CDU; first round: 39.2%). The planned inauguration date was 1 November 2025. The swearing-in ceremony took place on 4 November.

Stalzer is married and has two adopted children, a girl from Mali born 2007/8 and a boy from Haiti born 2009/10.

=== Stabbing incident ===
On 7 October 2025, Stalzer was stabbed thirteen times and critically injured. Her adopted son told police she had been attacked by several men outside the house. The boy was initially arrested, however Stalzer later identified her daughter as the attacker. Stalzer was tortured for hours and also suffered burns and skull fractures. The knife was found in the son's backpack. Stalzer was found in the living room, however a substantial amount of blood had been cleaned up in the cellar before emergency services were called.

One day before the attack, Stalzer contacted the police twice, because she felt threatened by her adopted daughter. The prosecutor is treating the case as "dangerous bodily harm" (the German equivalent of aggravated assault or grievous bodily harm) rather than attempted murder, due to the daughter's decision to call the emergency services. Both children have been placed in care. Stalzer has since recovered and been sworn into office.

== See also ==
- List of Social Democratic Party of Germany members
