= Herdecke =

- Town
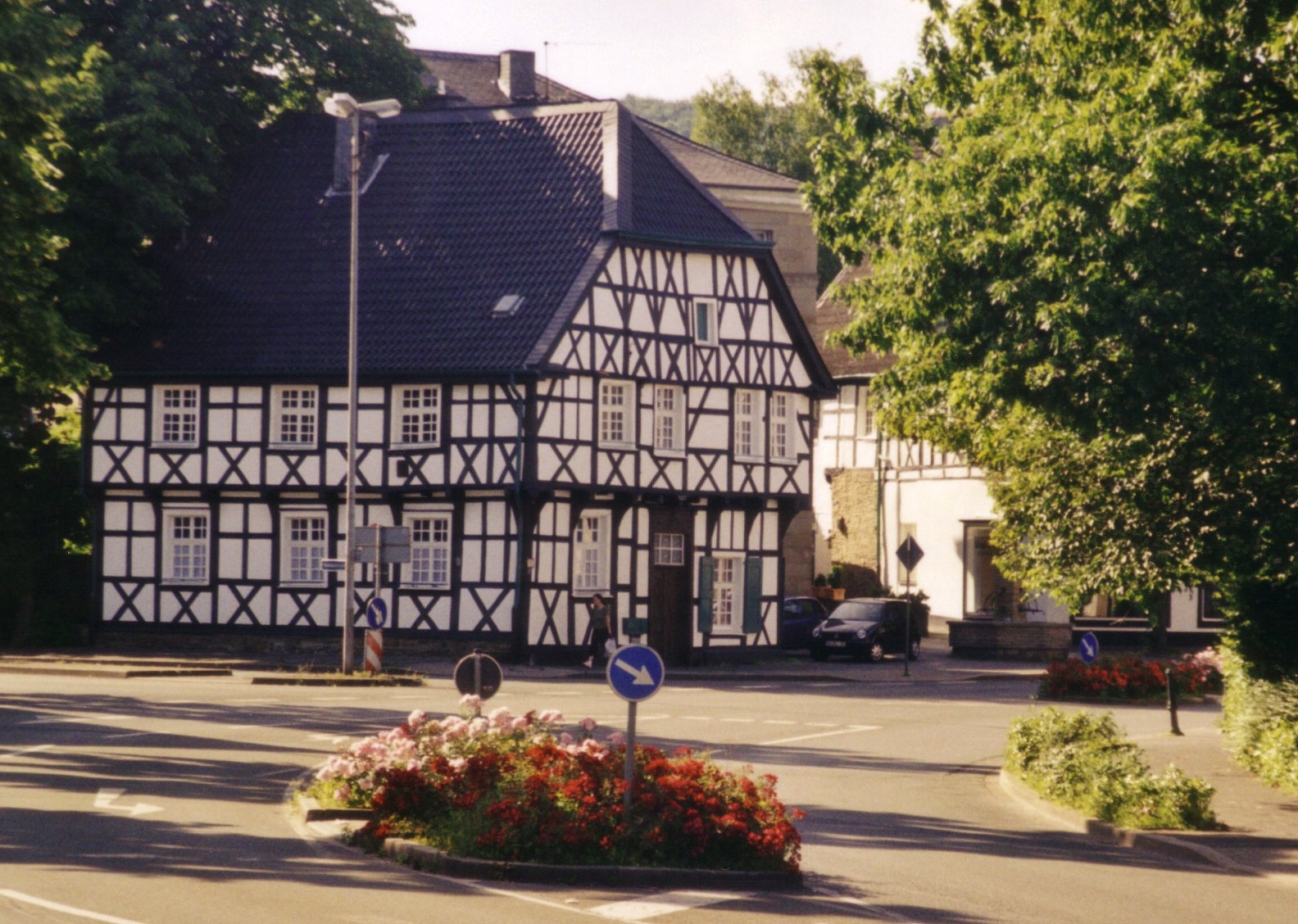
- An old timber framing house at the town entrance

- Flag Coat of arms

- Location of Herdecke within Ennepe-Ruhr-Kreis district
- Interactive map of Herdecke
- Location within Germany Location within North Rhine-Westphalia
- Coordinates: 51°24′N 07°26′E
- Country: Germany
- State: North Rhine-Westphalia
- Admin. region: Arnsberg
- District: Ennepe-Ruhr-Kreis

Government
  - Mayor (2025–30): Iris Stalzer (SPD)

Area
  - Total: 22.39 km^{2} (8.64 sq mi)
- Elevation: 274 m (899 ft)

Population (2025-12-31)
  - Total: 22,704
  - Density: 1,014/km^{2} (2,626/sq mi)
- Time zone: UTC+01:00 (CET)
  - Summer (DST): UTC+02:00 (CEST)
- Postal codes: 58313
- Dialling codes: 02330
- Vehicle registration: EN
- Website: www.herdecke.de

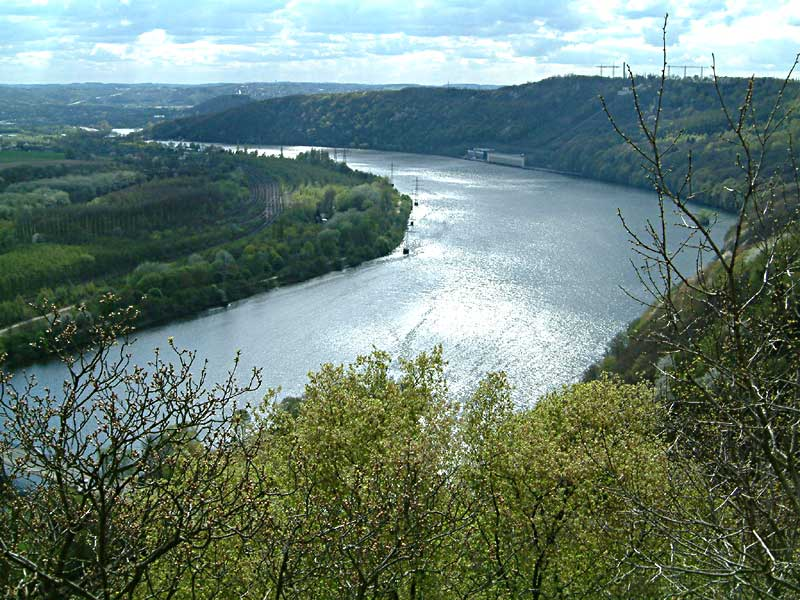
View towards Herdecke over the Hengsteysee.

Herdecke (German pronunciation: [ˈhɛʁˌdɛkə]) is a town in the district of Ennepe-Ruhr-Kreis, North Rhine-Westphalia in Germany. It is located south of Dortmund in the Ruhr Area. Its location between the two Ruhr reservoirs Hengsteysee and Harkortsee has earned it the nickname Die Stadt zwischen den Ruhrseen (lit. The city between the Ruhr lakes).

The city is located in the area of the Regionalverband Ruhr (RVR). The two Ruhr lakes as well as the forests on the Ardey heights make the town attractive to tourists. The historic center with its many half timbered houses and the 30-metre-high railway viaduct across the Ruhr valley are two more landmarks.

== Geography ==
Herdecke is located at the foot of the Ardeygebirge, the northwestern part of the Sauerland, between Dortmund in the North and Northeast, Hagen in the South, Wetter (Ruhr) in the Southwest and Witten in the West and Northwest. Herdecke lies between 80 and 274 meters above sea levels. It lies on the north bank of the river Ruhr, between the Harkortsee to the west and the Hengsteysee to the east.

=== Geology ===
Though part of the Ruhrgebiet, the town was only indirectly influenced by the mining of coal, as it has few coal beds.

=== Climate ===
The average precipitation is between 850 and 900 mm. The average temperature is around 10.6 °C.

=== Town structure ===
Most of Herdecke lies North of the Ruhr except for a small part at the Ruhr bridge. The town is about 8 kilometers in length from North-East to South-West and 5 kilometers in width from North-West to South-East.

Herdecke has two major settlements: Herdecke proper and Ende. The latter covers the former town of Ende with its farming communities Kirchende, Ostende, Westende and Gedern as well as the "mansion district" Ahlenberg.

== History ==
The origin of Herdecke was the foundation of a women's monastery at the beginning of the 9th century. The former monastery church (Stiftskirche), which was rebuilt in the second half of the 13th century, still retains parts of the original Carolingian construction.

In 1324 Herdecke went from ownership of the Electorate of Cologne to the County of Mark. The count took all jurisdiction from the abbess and erected a pillory in front of the church which existed until 1700. 1355 market rights were given by Count Engelbert III. In the following centuries the regionally important corn market developed thanks to the good connection to trading roads from Cologne to the Weser area, Münsterland and Siegerland.

1594 free jurisdiction was canceled. In 1615 Herdecke became a Freiheit. In the winter of 1624/1625, Herdecke was host to a garrison of Spanish military. It was given city rights by Friedrich Wilhelm I in 1739.

The Fourth Edition of Meyers Konversations-Lexikon noted in 1888: „Herdecke, town in Prussian government district Arnsberg, Hagen, 104 meters above sea levels. Lies at the navigable Ruhr and the lines Hagen-Witten, Hagen-Dahlhausen and Schwelm-Dortmund of the Prussian State Railroad Company. Has an evangelic and catholic church, great sandstone quarries as well as factories for fabrics, tobacco, leather paper and hardware, dye works and beer brewing. On the heights of the town is the Kaisberg with a tower commemorating the Baron of Stein; further away are the remnants of the Hohensyburg; the new tower was erected to honour president v. Vinke. Underneath the Hohensyburg lies the Sonnenstein, a 200 meter high plateau where every year in June the famous Rhein-Westfalic Sonnenstein fair is being held. Next to Herdecke lies Vorhalle with its iron and brass factories.“

1939 Ende was incorporated into Herdecke. In World War II the town was godfather to the U 751, a submarine that was sunk in the Atlantic by British planes on 17 July 1942.

=== Population history ===
In the course of two centuries between 1739 and 1939 Herdecke changed from a medieval market town to a flourishing small town. The population between 1939 and 1993 grew at 147% because of people's wishes to "have a green home". In the 1990s the population reached its maximum to this day (26,500). The population slowly declined afterwards.

Because of the population grow Herdecke is a town with the most sealed surfaces in the Government District of Arnsberg. More than a third of the town's surface has been built upon and almost 300 square metres of surface per person is sealed.

Historical population

Year	Pop.	±% p.a.
1793	896	—
1939	10,713	+1.71%
1961	17,218	+2.18%
1965	18,176	+1.36%
1970	20,909	+2.84%
1975	22,565	+1.54%
1980	24,004	+1.24%
1985	24,391	+0.32%

Year	Pop.	±% p.a.
1990	26,184	+1.43%
1995	26,278	+0.07%
2000	25,928	−0.27%
2005	25,538	−0.30%
2010	24,428	−0.88%
2015	22,818	−1.35%
2020	22,653	−0.15%
2025	22,704	+0.04%

Source: Landesdatabank Nordrhein-Westfalen (1965-2025)

=== Emblem ===
The Herdecke emblem is a silvern oak on a hill bearing yellow fruit upon a red shield. The so-called "Herta-Oak" has been the city's trademark for a long time. A city seal of 1784 already shows a tree. Since the giving of the emblem by the Prussian Government in 1902, the official emblem bears a wall with three towers on the top side.

== Politics ==
The currently mayor of Herdecke up until 2025 was Katja Strauss-Köster, an independent politician endorsed by the CDU, The Greens, and FDP. She was first elected in 2009, winning 71% of votes, and re-elected in 2015. In the most recent mayoral election on 13 September 2020, Strauss-Köster was re-elected again with 66.0% of votes, defeating Jan-Christoph Schaberick of the SPD. Iris Stalzer was elected as new mayor in 2025, and at 7 October 2025 she was involved in a knife stabbing incident outside her home in Herdecke, leaving her critically injured.

=== City council ===
Results of the 2020 city council election.

The Herdecke city council governs the city alongside the Mayor. The most recent city council election was held on 13 September 2020, and the results were as follows:

Party	Votes	%	+/-	Seats	+/-
Social Democratic Party (SPD)	3,730	32.3	▼8.9	12	▼4
Christian Democratic Union (CDU)	3,315	28.7	▼0.9	11	±0
Alliance 90/The Greens (Grüne)	2,250	19.5	▲5.1	7	▲2
Free Democratic Party (FDP)	967	8.4	▲0.6	3	±0
Alternative for Germany (AfD)	505	4.4	New	2	New
The Left (Die Linke)	450	3.9	▼3.1	1	▼2
Die PARTEI	328	2.8	New	1	New
Valid votes	11,545	98.7			
Invalid votes	153	1.3			
Total	11,698	100.0		37	▼1
Electorate/voter turnout	19,770	59.2			
Source: City of Herdecke

== Town partnerships ==
There is a town partnership with Blankenburg (Harz). The town has a display on every Herdecke May Fair where typical foods and beverages as well are offered and touristic offers are being shown.

== Culture and Sites ==
=== Sites of interest ===
Tourism is popular especially around and on the two Ruhr lakes. There is Bachviertel, the historical part of Herdecke.

- Ruhr Viaduct
- Gut Schede
- Haus Mallinckrodt
- Haus Ende
- Haus Kallenberg
- Herdecke's old town district

Industrial culture

- Koepchenwerk (a pumped-storage hydroelectricity plant)
- Water power station Hengstey (only partly in Herdecke)
- Power station Stiftsmühle (a run-of-the-river hydroelectricity plant)

Churches

- Protestant Church St. Marien
- Protestent Church of Kirchende
- Catholic Church of St. Philippus and Jakobus

=== Leisure activities ===
Herdecke has a lot of forest areas where one can hike or jog. Both Ruhr lakes are usable for watersports. The leisure centre "Bleichstein" has playgrounds and large grass areas. There is an open-air pool and a hall pool.

In addition to the "Bleichstein" there is "Am Kalkheck" in Kirchende. There are several sport clubs and further smaller areas for sporting and for leisure.

Herdecke is the home of some world champion and Olympic winners. (e.g. Mark Warnecke).

=== Events ===
Herdecke has no municipal event hall, but there are two larger halls where to have events. 1984 the Ruhrfestsaal was inaugurated in collaboration with the hotel Zweibrücker Hof. It can be used for 350 people and was extended in 2005. Since 2001 there is a private music hall, the Werner-Richard-Saal which can also take 350 visitors.

The museum Heimatstube is the only museum in town. Since 1993 it sits in Stiftsplatz 3 next to the city hall in a historic building. Here the town's history is presented.

There is a theatre Am Stiftsplatz and since 1992 there has been a theatre ensemble called Theater 'ne ah.

In 1978 a cinema called Onikon was opened (No Kino backwards; Kino = cinema in German). In addition there is an art gallery Ruhrgalerie as well as private artists galleries or ateliers.

Regular events

- May fair: Every year on Ascension day there is a four day-events with a historic market and medieval elements as well as music, dances and sports in the town center. Many clubs take part in the organisation of the event.
- Flea market: in May and October
- Weekly market: every Thursday morning in the town center.
- Herdecke city run: in June by the club TSV Herdecke
- Ende city run: in September by the club TuS Ende
- Christmas run: end of year by the club RC Westfalen Herdecke
- Shooting fairs (two clubs)

== Infrastructure and economy ==
Herdecke is home to many high-income families. In 2001 39 income millionaires with more than 500,000 Euro annual income lived in Herdecke. Because of the high amount of taxes paid, the neighbouring city of Hagen has tried to incorporate Herdecke into Hagen.

=== Traffic ===
==== Public transport ====
Herdecke is accessed by train (Volmetalbahn). There are two stations: Herdecke and Wittbräucke. The Volmetalbahn runs every hour from Dortmund to Lüdenscheid and back. The station Hagen-Vorhalle, south of Herdecke, used to be called Herdecke Vorhalle.

Six bus lines connect Herdecke to its neighbouring towns and cities, for example the line 376 to Witten or the line 518 to Hagen.

==== Roads ====
Herdecke has a connection to the A1 and A45 motorways and routes 54, 226 and 234.

== Public facilities ==
Herdecke is home to the anthroposophic hospital Gemeinschaftskrankenhaus Herdecke. A school for the civil service is located in Haus Ende.

== Education ==
There are five primary schools (im Dorf, Kirchende, Robert-Bonnermann, Schraberg, Vinkenberg), a special school (Albert-Schweitzer-Schule), two secondary schools (Am Sonnenstein, Am Bleichstein) and a high school (Friedrich-Harkort-Schule). A musical school and an adult evening school also exist.

The Witten/Herdecke University is located in adjacent Witten. The "Herdecke" part of the name refers to the hospital Gemeinschaftskrankenhaus Herdecke, which cooperates with the university.

== Social organisations ==
- Fire brigade
- Johanniter-Unfall-Hilfe
- Deutsches Rotes Kreuz
- Deutsche Lebens-Rettungs-Gesellschaft

== Media ==
Several local newspapers exist. Herdecke is sometimes reported on in radio and TV stations nearby (e.g. in Dortmund or Hagen).

== Companies ==
The biggest employer is the hospital. Some famous German companies like Dörken, Dörken MKS-Systeme or Idealspaten are located in Herdecke. WestfaliaSurge, one of the world's leading milking machine producers, left Herdecke in 2005 after 30 years.

== Notable people ==
- Antje Jackelén, German-Swedish Lutheran Archbishop of Uppsala and primate of the Church of Sweden
- Jürgen Klopp, German football coach (Liverpool F.C.)
- Stephan Letter, serial killer and former nurse accused of murdering patients
- Hank Levine, movie director and producer
- Lars Ricken, German football player (Borussia Dortmund)
- Irmingard Schewe-Gerigk, member of German Bundestag
- Iris Stalzer, mayor of Herdecke in 2025
- Naziha al-Dulaimi, the first female minister in the history of Iraq and the region,

Al-Dulaimi is one of the pioneers of the Iraqi women's movement. She was born in 1923 in Baghdad and entered the College of Medicine in Baghdad in 1941. She belonged to the Iraqi Communist Party in 1948, and in 1959 she assumed the Ministry of Municipalities in the government of Abdul Karim Qasim.

Naziha al-Dulaimi played an important role in issuing the Personal Status Law in Iraq in 1959.
