= List of unusual animal deaths =

Lists of unusual deaths
Antiquity	Middle Ages	Renaissance	Early modern period
19th century	20th century	21st century	Animal deaths

This list of unusual deaths includes unique or extremely rare circumstances of death recorded for animals, noted as being unusual by multiple sources.

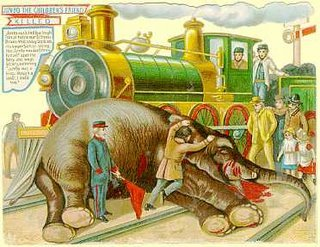
Postcard of the death of Jumbo

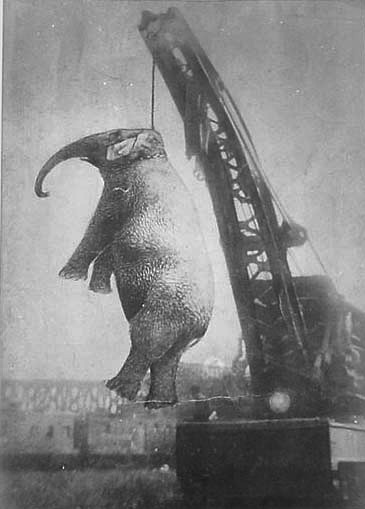
Photo of questionable authenticity depicting the execution of Mary

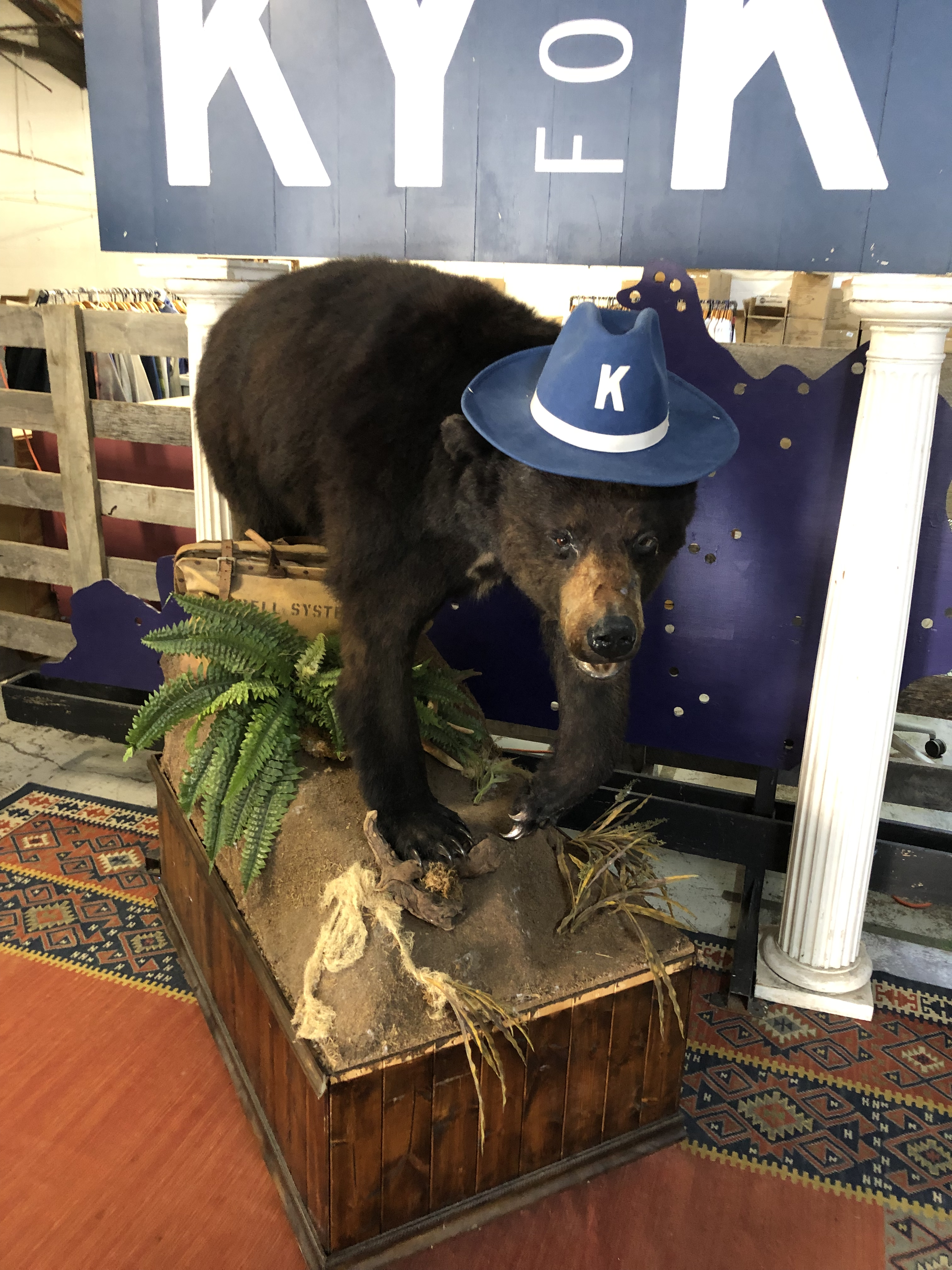
Cocaine Bear on display in Kentucky, 36 years after his death

== Animal deaths ==
Name of animal	Image	Date of death	Country	Details
Jocko the monkey		July 1880	United States	The performance monkey from Goldsboro, North Carolina, was found dead after he hanged himself with a makeshift noose made with clothesline. It is believed that Jocko did it as an experiment after watching public hangings with his owner Rockwell Syrock.
Jumbo the elephant		15 September 1885	Canada	The celebrity elephant died shortly after being hit by an unscheduled train in St. Thomas, Ontario. P. T. Barnum claimed that he had intentionally run towards it to save a fellow elephant, but eye-witness reports dispute this. Rumors contend that the death was staged.
Topsy the elephant		4 January 1903	United States	As a publicity stunt to advertise the opening of Luna Park, the elephant was fed carrots laced with cyanide, strangled, and electrocuted. A 74-second film of the electrocution was recorded and preserved, possibly the first death captured on film.
Mary the elephant		13 September 1916	United States	The day after the five-ton cow elephant killed a trainer for the Sparks World Famous Shows circus in Sullivan County, Tennessee, she was hanged by the neck from a railcar-mounted industrial crane.
Tubby the Cocker Spaniel		7 November 1940	United States	The Cocker Spaniel was the sole fatality of the collapse of the Tacoma Narrows Bridge over the Tacoma Narrows, Washington. When the initial collapse began, Tubby's owner initially escaped from his car and got off of the bridge on foot but later attempted to rescue the stranded dog along with other bystanders. Frightened, Tubby bit the hand of one of his rescuers moments before the bridge finally collapsed, causing the dog to fall to his death.
Stuckie the dog		c. 1960	United States	The posthumously named mummified dog was discovered by Georgia Kraft Co. loggers in 1980, lodged in a chestnut oak approximately 28 feet (8.5 m) from the base. The low moisture and tannins found in the tree, combined with a circulated airflow, preserved his body and kept the smell of natural putrefaction away from scavenging animals. He remains on display at Southern Forest World in Waycross, Georgia.
Seagull		4 August 1983	Canada	During a Major League Baseball Yankees-Blue Jays game at Toronto's Exhibition Stadium, Yankees right fielder Dave Winfield threw a warm-up ball which hit a seagull, killing it. After the game, Toronto police charged Winfield with causing "unnecessary suffering of an animal". The charges were dropped the following day.
Cocaine Bear		1985	United States	A 175-kilogram (386 lb) American black bear died in Georgia in 1985 after overdosing on cocaine. The cocaine had been dumped from an airplane piloted by Andrew C. Thornton II, a former narcotics officer turned convicted drug smuggler. It inspired the 2023 film Cocaine Bear.
Deer		14 August 1987	Austria	During practice for the 1987 Austrian Grand Prix, Swedish driver Stefan Johansson hit a roe deer with his McLaren MP4/3 after it wandered onto the circuit. It was struck by Johansson traveling at close to 140 mph (230 km/h), killing it instantly. Johansson survived.
Olympic doves		17 September 1988	South Korea	During the opening ceremony of the 1988 Summer Olympics in Seoul, South Korea, hundreds of live doves were released as a symbol of world peace. Many of the doves landed on the Olympic cauldron just prior to it being lit. When the cauldron was lit, over a dozen of the doves resting on the rim of the cauldron and flying directly above it were burned alive by the Olympic flame. The death of the birds marked the last time that live doves were used.
Goose		30 March 1999	United States	On the inaugural ride of the Apollo's Chariot rollercoaster at Busch Gardens Williamsburg, male model Fabio was struck in the face by a goose during the first drop. The goose was killed, while Fabio's nose was bloodied and required stitches.
Dove		24 March 2001	United States	During a Major League Baseball spring training game, pitcher Randy Johnson threw a fastball just as a bird flew through the pitch's path, killing it instantly.
Alan the dachshund		14 January 2013	England	The dachshund and Tatler magazine's "office dog" saw a man approaching the revolving doors of Vogue House and walked after the man. As Alan tried to rush through the revolving doors, his neck got caught in it, also getting the worker stuck in the door. Two fire engines rushed to the scene, where they freed the man, but could not free Alan, who died at the scene.
Admire Rakti the horse		4 November 2014	Australia	The Japanese Thoroughbred racehorse died of sudden cardiac arrest minutes after finishing last in the 2014 Melbourne Cup. He was the favorite to win, with betting odds of 5-1.
Kabibe the gorilla		7 November 2014	United States	The 15-month-old western lowland gorilla was accidentally crushed by a hydraulic door in her enclosure at the San Francisco Zoo.
A giraffe, a rhinoceros, two lions, and two hyenas		25 January 2019	South Africa	A storm broke a power line in Kruger National Park, fatally electrocuting a giraffe and a white rhinoceros. Two lions and two hyenas were also electrocuted while attempting to feed on the dead animals.
Cachou the bear		April 2020	Spain	The 6-year-old brown bear was found dead on 9 April 2020 in the Pyrenees. A necropsy posited that Cachou was killed by another bear then pushed off a cliff, but this was challenged by several conservation groups. It also found antifreeze in its stomach, leading the founder of environmental organization Ipcena to conjecture that a person killed a deer, filled it with honey and antifreeze, and left it in the path of the bear. A forest ranger was arrested in connection with the killing.
Fiona the hippo		19 November 2026	United States	The 9-year-old hippopotamus died after complications from swallowing a knit hat. The hat was tossed into the air by a 2-year-old visitor and got caught by a ceiling fan that catapulted it through a small opening above the area's viewing windows, landing in her mouth. A spokesperson later said "We probably couldn't make that happen again if we tried. It was clearly an accident."
