= List of unusual deaths in the 19th century =

Lists of unusual deaths
Antiquity	Middle Ages	Renaissance	Early modern period
19th century	20th century	21st century	Animal deaths

This list of unusual deaths includes unique or extremely rare circumstances of death recorded throughout the 19th century, noted as being unusual by multiple sources.

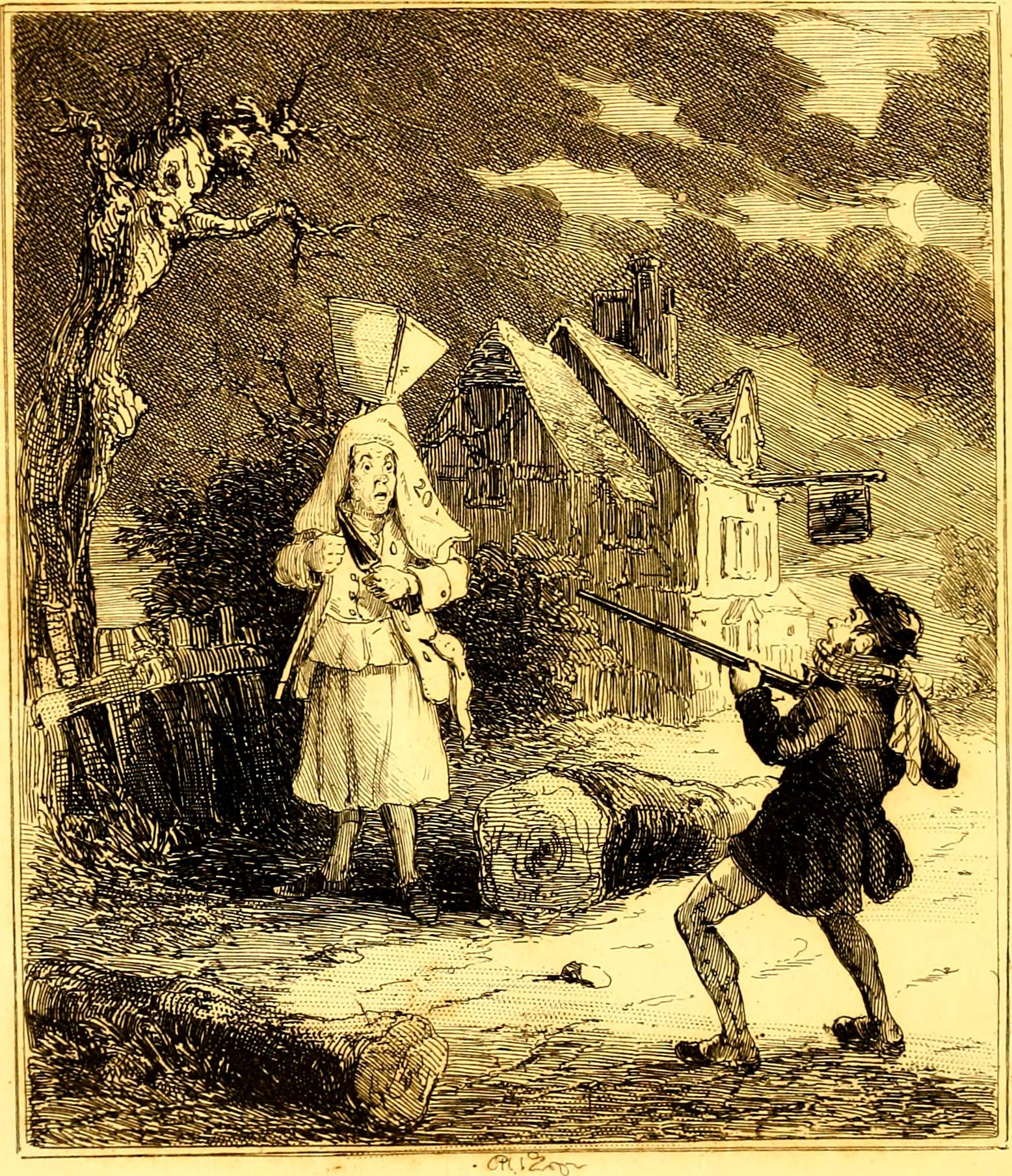
The fatal shooting of Thomas Millwood, mistaken for a ghost

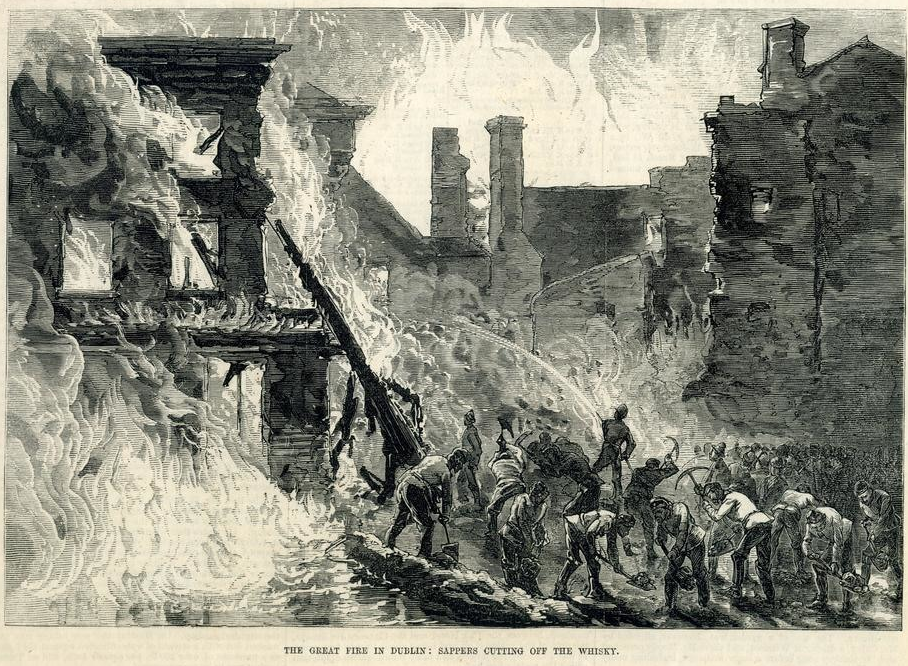
The Dublin whiskey fire

The assassination of Empress Elisabeth of Austria

== 19th century ==
Name of person	Image	Date of death	Country	Details
Thomas Millwood		3 January 1804	England	The 32-year-old plasterer was shot and killed by excise officer Francis Smith, who mistook him for the Hammersmith ghost due to his white uniform. Smith was later sentenced to death, but his sentence was commuted to one year's imprisonment with hard labor, and he received a full pardon later in the year.
Victims of the London Beer Flood		17 October 1814	England	At Meux & Co's Horse Shoe Brewery, a 22-foot-tall (6.7 m) wooden vat of fermenting porter burst, causing chain reactions and destroying several large beer barrels. The beer subsequently flooded the nearby slum and killed eight people. Several people also reportedly died from alcohol poisoning as a result of drinking the flooded liquor.
William Henry Harrison		4 April 1841	United States	The 9th President of the United States died a month after his inauguration from an illness (possibly pneumonia or enteric fever) that developed after he stood in the rain to deliver his 2-hour-long inaugural address, the longest by any U.S. President. Medical treatments Harrison received in the last week of his life included opium, castor oil and leeches. Harrison remains the U.S. President to have served the shortest term in office and was the first President to die in office.
Zachary Taylor		9 July 1850	United States	The 12th President of the United States died of diarrhea and dysentery 5 days after consuming raw cherries and iced milk at a 4th of July event at the site of the Washington Monument. Persistent speculation that Taylor was poisoned would lead to the exhumation of some of his remains in 1991, but scientific testing found no evidence of poison.
William Snyder		11 January 1854	United States	The 13-year-old died in San Francisco, California, reportedly after a circus clown named Manuel Rays swung him around by his heels.
Victims of the 1858 Bradford sweets poisoning		1858	England	In Bradford, England, a batch of sweets accidentally poisoned with arsenic trioxide were sold by William Hardaker, colloquially referred to as "Humbug Billy". Around five boxes of sweets were delivered and sold. Around 20 people died and 200 people suffered from the effects of the poison.
Jim Creighton		18 October 1862	United States	The 21-year-old American baseball player from Manhattan died from abdominal pain, possibly caused by pitching or swinging at the ball, which likely gave him a ruptured bladder or a ruptured hernia.
Julius Peter Garesché		31 December 1862	United States	The 41-year-old Union officer was killed on the first day of the Battle of Stones River when a cannonball decapitated him.
Archduchess Mathilda of Austria		6 June 1867	Austria-Hungary	The 18-year-old daughter of Archduke Albrecht, Duke of Teschen set her dress on fire while trying to hide a cigarette from her father, who had forbidden her to smoke.
Unknown woman		1869	England	A woman in Gayton le Marsh, Lincolnshire, England, became severely ill and later died after consuming her own hair for 12 years.
Clement Vallandigham		17 June 1871	United States	The American politician and lawyer, who was defending a man accused of murder, accidentally shot himself while demonstrating how the victim might have done so. His client was acquitted.
James "Jim" Cullen		6 November 1873	United States	The 25-year-old Irish man became the only man ever lynched in Mapleton, Maine, after he committed a robbery and beat two deputy sheriffs to death with an axe.
Unknown man		1875	England	A factory worker in Manchester found a mouse on her table and screamed. A man rushed over to her and tried to shoo it away, but it tried to hide in his clothes, and when he gasped in surprise the mouse dove into his mouth and he swallowed it. The mouse tore and bit the man's throat and chest, and he later died "in horrible agony".
Victims of the Dublin whiskey fire		18 June 1875	Ireland	At The Liberties, Dublin, Ireland (then part of the United Kingdom), a fire broke out at Laurence Malone's bonded storehouse on the corner of Ardee Street, where 5,000 hogsheads (262,500 imperial gallons or 1,193,000 litres or 315,200 US gallons) of whiskey were being stored. The heat caused the barrels in the storehouse to explode, sending a stream of whiskey flowing through the doors and windows of the burning building. The burning whiskey then flowed along the streets where it quickly demolished a row of small houses. Despite the damage from the fire, all of the resulting 13 fatalities were caused by alcohol poisoning after drinking the undiluted flooded whiskey.
James A. Moon		10 June 1876	United States	The 37-year-old blacksmith, self-proclaimed inventor, and American Civil War veteran killed himself with a makeshift guillotine.
Samuel Wardell		31 December 1885	United States	The lamplighter in Flatbush, Brooklyn, New York, had attached a 10-pound (4.5 kg) rock to his alarm clock, which would crash to the floor and awaken him. On Christmas Eve, he rearranged his furniture for a party, but forgot to change his room back afterwards. When the alarm mechanism went off the next morning, the rock fell on his head and killed him.
George Murchison		13 May 1886	United States	The 8-year-old boy from Aroostook County, Maine, died from a hemorrhage after having a live snake pulled out of his mouth. It was speculated the snake had entered his throat after he had "gone to sleep in some field".
Caroline Yates		16 March 1887	New South Wales	According to an autopsy during her inquest, the 25-year-old woman, living in Redfern, New South Wales at the time, died from peritonitis due to an internal injury inflicted by Dr. Sabowiski with the intent of "procuring abortion".
Unknown man		22 August 1888	Iraq	At around 8:30 pm, a shower of meteorites fell "like rain" on a village in Sulaymaniyah (then part of the Ottoman Empire). One man was paralyzed and another died. His death is considered the only credible case of death-by-meteorite.
Isaack Rabbanovitch, two sons, and one daughter		August 1891	Russian Empire	A bear walked into the Rabbanovitch's inn in Vilna (now part of Lithuania) and picked up a keg of vodka. When Rabbanovitch and his children tried to take it back, he was hugged to death by the intoxicated bear along with his two sons and daughter. Villagers shot and killed the bear.
Unknown sailor		1892	Bermuda	A sailor in Bermuda was arguing with other sailors, but the argument turned into a fight and the sailor was pushed into the water. A marine began undressing for a rescue attempt, but an officer ordered him to stop because there was a boat nearby that had ladies on it. As the sailor continued struggling in the water, five men volunteered to save him, but he had already drowned.
Mary Agnes Lapish		April 1893	Victoria	The woman stumbled into a barbed-wire fence in Melbourne, possibly while intoxicated, and was strangled by her fur collar.
Walter Cowles		November 1893	England	The 24-year-old envelope cutter was drinking at the Carlisle Arms Tavern in Soho, London, when he boasted about being able to fit a billiard ball into his mouth and close it fully. Upon inserting the ball, he swallowed it and subsequently choked to death.
Jeremiah Haralson		1895	United States	The former United States Congressman from Alabama disappears from the historical record after his 1895 imprisonment for pension fraud in Albany, New York. He was reportedly killed by an unknown animal while coal mining near Denver, Colorado, c. 1916, but there is little or no historical evidence for this.
George Taylor		27 July 1895	United States	The tunnel watchman for the Louisville and Nashville Railroad was killed by a falling cow while working at a south tunnel near Gallatin, Tennessee. An investigation confirmed that the cow was standing on top of the tunnel when it fell off the edge, landing on the watchman, killing him instantly. The cow was also killed from the fall.
Bridget Driscoll		17 August 1896	England	The 44-year-old Irish-born woman, the first recorded case of a pedestrian killed in a collision with a motor car in Great Britain, was struck on the grounds of the Crystal Palace in London, by a car belonging to the Anglo-French Motor Carriage Company while giving demonstration rides.
Salomon August Andrée, Knut Frænkel, and Nils Strindberg		October 1897	Norway	The group of Swedish men died of exhaustion on the island Kvitøya after trying to reach the North Pole by hot air balloon.
Empress Elisabeth of Austria		10 September 1898	Switzerland	The Empress of Austria was stabbed with a thin file by Italian anarchist Luigi Lucheni while strolling through Geneva with her lady-in-waiting Irma Sztáray. The wound pierced her pericardium and a lung. As her extremely tight corset held the wound closed, she did not realize what had happened (instead believing a passerby had struck her) and walked on for some time before collapsing.

== Works cited ==
- Weeks, David; Gorman, Robert (2015). "15: Fans". Death at the Ballpark: More Than 2,000 Game-Related Fatalities of Players, Other Personnel and Spectators in Amateur and Professional Baseball, 1862–2014 (2nd ed.). McFarland. ISBN 9780786479320.
