= Dan Brodsky-Chenfeld =

American skydiver

Dan Brodsky-Chenfeld or Dan BC is a six-time world champion skydiver and a motivational speaker, known for his promotion of safety culture with frequent articles in the Parachutist magazine.

== Biography ==
Daniel Brodsky-Chenfeld was born in 1962 in Albany, New York to Howard Myron Chenfeld and Miriam "Mimi" Brodsky, moving to Columbus, Ohio in 1970 at age 8.

Brodsky-Chenfeld began studying aviation at The Ohio State University in 1980 and continued through earning his bachelor's degree in 1984. In a video posted to his personal YouTube, he recounts the background of how, during his studies at OSU working at the Greene County Sport Parachuting Club in Xenia, Ohio, through the 1980s transition from round parachutes to ram-air parachutes, his interactions with fellow AFF instructor and Tandem Instructor Drew purchasing older, unused round canopies inadvertently played a role in the Cocaine Bear incidents of 1985 and Brodsky-Chenfeld being investigated by the DEA for suspected involvement.

On April 22, 1992, Brodsky-Chenfeld was one of only 6 who survived a plane crash of Twin Otter N141PV caused by an engine failure immediately after takeoff that killed 16 people, including several other members of his skydiving team AirMoves. The NTSB ruled the cause to have been contaminated fuel, provided by the airport.

He spent six weeks in a coma, with major injuries, including a cervical fracture of his spine. The story is detailed in "The AirMoves Story" and FreeFall, as well as the June 1992 issue of Parachutist.

In 1994, he co-founded Arizona Airspeed, a skydiving team based at Skydive Arizona. Brodsky-Chenfeld led Airspeed four- and eight-person formation skydiving teams to six World Championships. Brodsky-Chenfeld is also a large formation skydiving world record holder. He has made over 30,000 skydives.

Brodsky-Chenfeld was inducted into the Skydiving Museum and Hall of Fame in 2014.

Brodsky-Chenfeld published the memoir: Above All Else: A World Champion Skydiver's Story of Survival and What It Taught Him About Fear, Adversity, and Success. He also did a TED Talk related to his memoir.

In November 2023, Brodsky-Chenfeld led a group of skydivers who formed a Star of David in the sky.
