= The World of Interiors =

British design magazine

- Cover of the November 2024 issue
- Editor: Emily Tobin
- Categories: Design magazine
- Frequency: Monthly
- Total circulation: 60,414 (June 2013)
- Founded: 1981; 45 years ago
- First issue: November 1981
- Company: Condé Nast
- Country: United Kingdom
- Based in: London
- Language: English
- Website: www.worldofinteriors.co.uk
- ISSN: 0264-083X

The World of Interiors is a magazine published by Condé Nast with a total readership of 152,000. The glossy monthly magazine covers interior design.

== History ==
The magazine began as Interiors in November 1981. It was founded in London, England, by Kevin Kelly, with Min Hogg as editor. Its unusual interiors and literate style set it apart from other interior titles, and within two years the magazine had been bought by Condé Nast (acquisition led by Bernard Leser) and it began publishing internationally under the name The World of Interiors (as there was already an American competitor named Interiors.

Since 2001, it was edited by Rupert Thomas, who had joined the magazine in 1991 and had been its deputy editor since 1997. In 2012, the magazine launched a special fashion issue.

In October 2019, the magazine launched the online directory The World of Interiors Index, which lists dealers, gallerists, and upholsters. In September 2021, Hamish Bowles became editor-in-chief of The World of Interiors. The magazine has only had three editors during its 41-year history. However, in 2024, Bowles became creative director-at-large and the magazine's editor Emily Tobin took on the editor-in-chief position.

The magazine's offices were formerly on the second floor of Vogue House.

== Content ==
The focus of The World of Interiors has been described as "startlingly beautiful things", and a "gorgeous physical object". It has continued to mix high and low interiors, historical and modern interiors. Domestic houses, church interiors and historical palaces have all been covered. In addition to photographic features of interiors, the magazine has "an editorial mix that has retained its eclecticism, wit and attention to every word."

Steven Kurutz from The New York Times called it "intelligent, witty and wide-ranging in its curiosity: a bible." When many other divisions of Condé Nast declined, the sales of The World of Interiors remained steady through the years, partly because its content is created by people, who "are all artistic bohemian types. It's the antithesis to the data-driven digital attitude that we have to embrace in other part of our business", according to an executive from Condé Nast Britain.

Fifty percent of readers work in design-related industries.
