= Anglo-French =

Anglo-French (or sometimes Franco-British) may refer to:

- France–United Kingdom relations
- Anglo-Norman language or its descendants, varieties of French used in medieval England
- Anglo-Français and Français (hound), an ancient type of hunting dog
- Anglo-French (automobile), made in Birmingham, England 1896–7
- Franglais, a Macaronic mixture of French and English languages
- A person or family of English and French ancestry
