= List of unusual deaths in the Renaissance =

Lists of unusual deaths
Antiquity	Middle Ages	Renaissance	Early modern period
19th century	20th century	21st century	Animal deaths

This list of unusual deaths includes unique or extremely rare circumstances of death recorded throughout the Renaissance period (defined here as 1400–1599 AD), noted as being unusual by multiple sources.

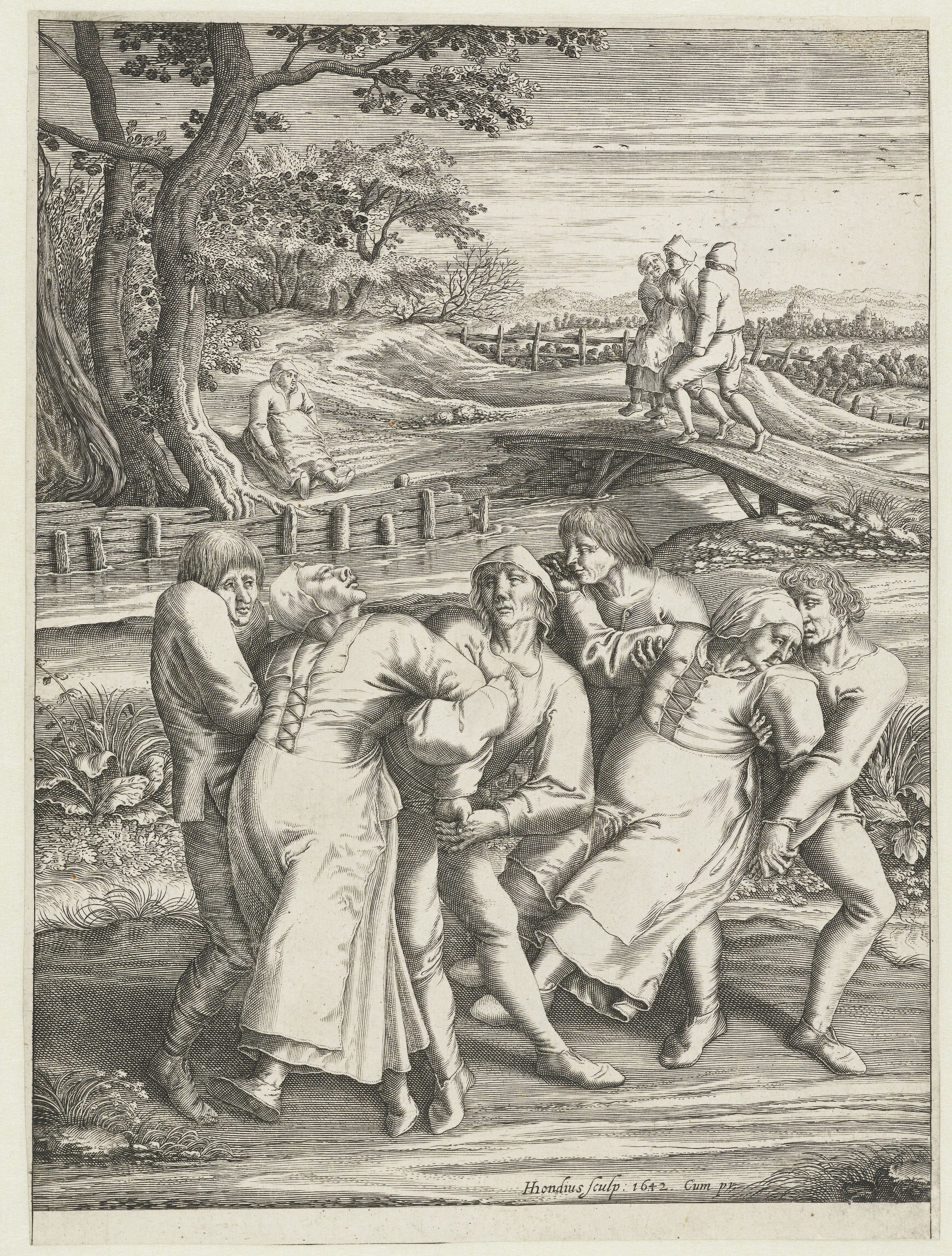
The dancing plague of 1518

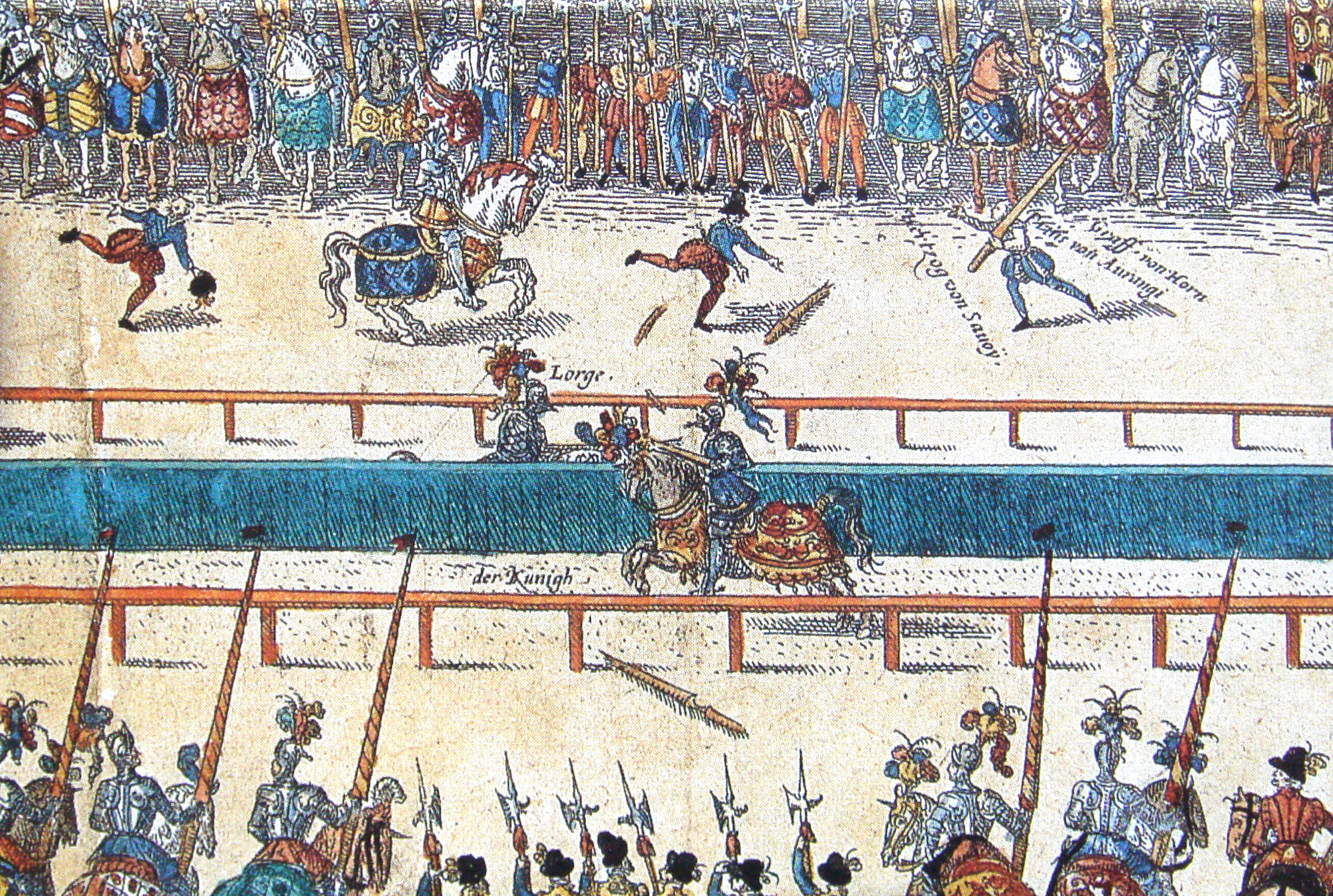
The tournament that led to the death of Henry II of France

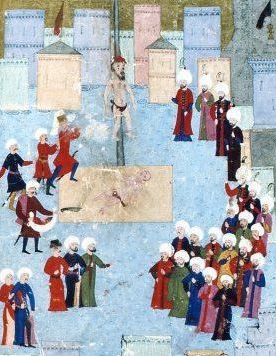
The skinning of Marco Antonio Bragadin

== Renaissance ==
Name of person	Image	Date of death	Country	Details
Martin of Aragon		31 May 1410	Principality of Catalonia	The Aragonese king died from a combination of indigestion and uncontrollable laughing. According to legend, Martin was suffering from indigestion, caused by eating an entire goose, when his favorite jester, Borra, entered the king's bedroom. When Martin asked Borra where he had been, the jester replied with: "Out of the next vineyard, where I saw a young deer hanging by his tail from a tree, as if someone had so punished him for stealing figs." This joke caused the king to die from laughter.
George Plantagenet, Duke of Clarence		18 February 1478	England	The 1st Duke of Clarence was allegedly executed by drowning in a barrel of Malmsey wine, apparently his own choice once he accepted he was to be killed.
Charles VIII of France		7 April 1498	Kingdom of France	The French king died as a result of striking his head on the lintel of a door while on his way to watch a game of real tennis.
Victims of the 1518 dancing plague		July 1518	Holy Roman Empire	Several people died of either heart attacks, strokes or exhaustion during a dancing mania that occurred in Strasbourg, Alsace (Holy Roman Empire).
Robert Pakington		13 November 1536	England	The 47-year-old merchant and MP was killed in London by a wheellock pistol, making his death the first political assassination performed by a firearm.
Pietro Aretino		21 October 1556	Republic of Venice	The influential Italian author and libertine is said to have died of suffocation from laughing too much at an obscene joke during a meal in Venice. Another version states that he fell from a chair from too much laughter, fracturing his skull.
Henry II of France		10 July 1559	Kingdom of France	On 30 June 1559, a tournament was held near Place des Vosges to celebrate the Peace of Cateau-Cambrésis with the French king's longtime enemies, the Habsburgs of Austria, and to celebrate the marriage of his daughter Elisabeth of Valois to King Philip II of Spain. During a jousting match, Henry, wearing the colors of his mistress Diane de Poitiers, was wounded in the eye by a fragment of the splintered lance of Gabriel Montgomery, captain of the King's Scottish Guard. Despite the efforts of royal surgeons Ambroise Paré and Andreas Vesalius, the court doctors ultimately "advocated a wait-and-see strategy"; as a result, the king's untreated eye and brain damage led to his death by sepsis ten days later. His death played a significant role in the decline of jousting as a sport, particularly in France.
Amy Robsart		8 September 1560	England	The 28-year-old wife of Robert Dudley, Earl of Leicester was found dead by a staircase with two wounds on her head and a broken neck. Theories suggest she threw herself down the stairs.
Hans Staininger		28 September 1567	Bavaria	The burgomaster of Braunau am Inn (then Bavaria, now Austria) died when he broke his neck by tripping over his own beard. The beard, which was 4.5 feet (1.4 m) long at the time, was usually kept rolled up in a leather pouch.
James Stewart, Earl of Moray, Regent of Scotland	James Stewart, 1st Earl of Moray	23 January 1570	Scotland	Hearing the rumours of a plot against him, Regent Moray was on his way out of Linlithgow, a haven of supporters of his half-sister Mary in a civil war. His planned route was blocked, and he was forced to ride through a narrow crowded street by the house of Archbishop John Hamilton, the baptist of Mary's son, infant King James VI. Archbishop's nephew James Hamilton shot Moray with a gun from an upstairs window covered with linen sheets, and escaped on a horse bypassing the crowded streets. James Stewart is considered to be the first head of government to be assassinated with a firearm.
Marco Antonio Bragadin		17 August 1571	Cyprus	The Venetian Captain-General of Famagusta in Cyprus was gruesomely killed after the Ottomans took over the city. This was in contravention of negotiated safe passage after the Ottoman Empire took Famagusta. He was dragged around the walls with sacks of earth and stone on his back; next, he was tied to a chair and hoisted to the yardarm of the Turkish flagship, where he was exposed to the taunts of the sailors. Finally, he was taken to his place of execution in the main square, tied naked to a column, and flayed alive. Bragadin's skin was stuffed with straw and sewn, reinvested with his military insignia, and exhibited riding an ox in a mocking procession along the streets of Famagusta. The macabre trophy was hoisted upon the masthead pennant of the personal galley of the Ottoman commander, Amir al-bahr Mustafa Pasha, to be taken to Constantinople as a gift for Sultan Selim II. Bragadin's skin was stolen in 1580 by a Venetian seaman and brought back to Venice, where it was received as a returning hero.
Victims of the Black Assize of Oxford 1577		July 1577	England	In Oxford, England, at least 300 people, including Lord Chief Baron of the Exchequer Sir Robert Bell and Serjeant Nicholas Barham, died in the aftermath of the trial of Rowland Jenkes, a Catholic bookseller convicted of distributing pamphlets defaming Queen Elizabeth I, at the assize at Oxford. The dead reportedly included no women or children.
Mary, Queen of Scots		8 February 1587	England	The 44-year-old queen of Scotland was told that she was to be executed for plotting the assassination of her cousin, Queen Elizabeth I. However, when the executioner, only known as Bull, prepared to chop off her head with an axe, the first blow did not kill Mary. It only hit her head. The second blow severed her neck, but the tendon was still left. The executioner later pulled off Mary's head only to reveal that her hair was a wig.
Andrew Perne		26 April 1589	England	The Vice-Chancellor of Cambridge University and Dean of Ely was known for his frequent religious conversions to match the established faith of the time in England. He reportedly died due to having heard the jester of Queen Elizabeth I make a joke about his uncertain spiritual state, referring to him as "one that is neither heaven nor earth, but hangs betwixt both".

== Works cited ==
- Barber, Richard; Barker, Juliet (1989). Tournaments: Jousts, Chivalry and Pageants in the Middle Ages. Boydell. pp. 134, 139. ISBN 978-0-85115-470-1.
- Baumgartner, Frederic J (1988). Henry II, King of France, 1547–1559. Duke University Press. ISBN 9780822307952.
- Wellman, Kathleen (2013). Queens and Mistresses of Renaissance France. Yale University Press.
