= Darwin Awards =

Rhetorical tongue-in-cheek award

- Website type: Humor
- Owner: Wendy Northcutt
- Website: darwinawards.com
- Commercial: Yes
- Launched: 1993; 33 years ago

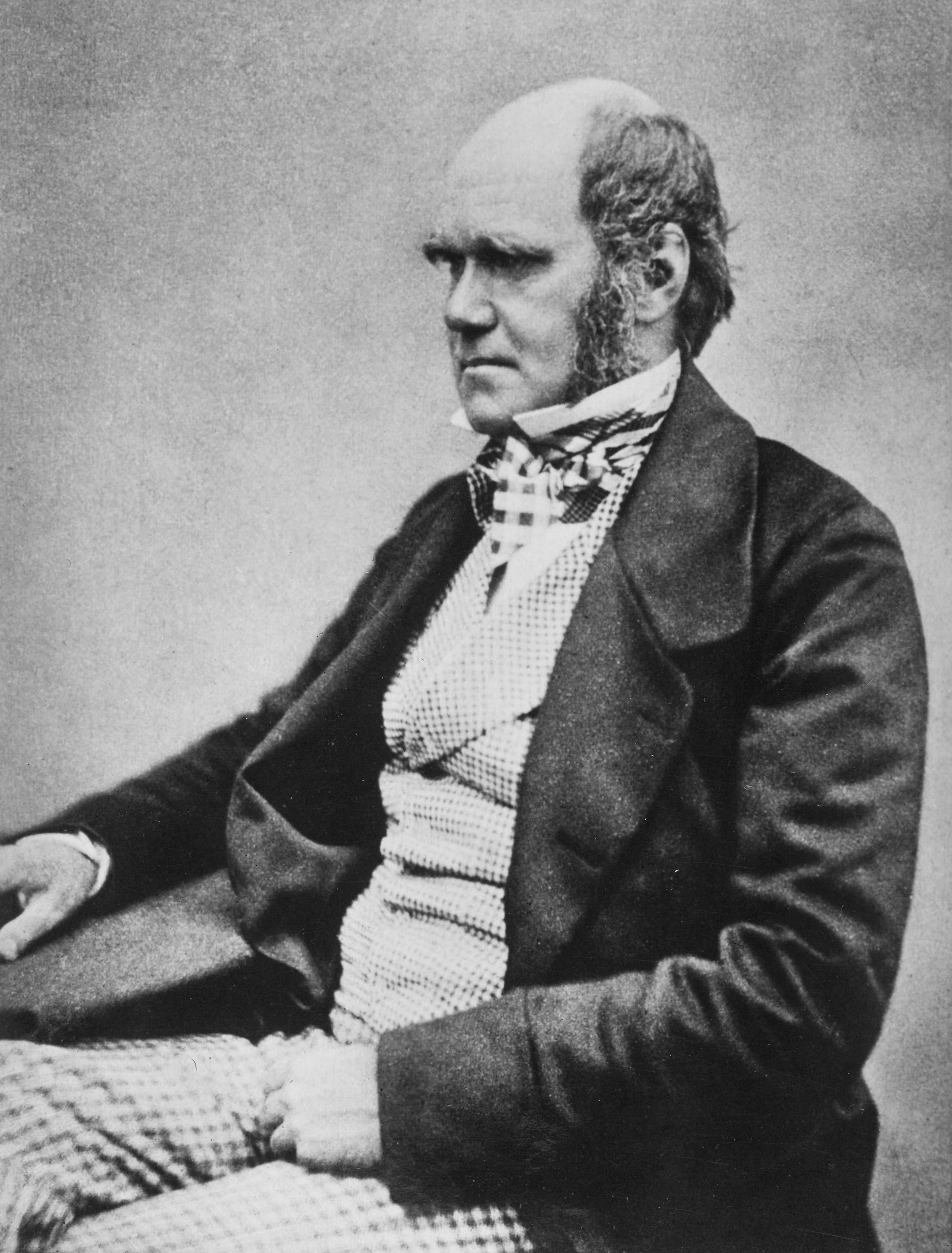
Charles Darwin, after whom the awards are named

The Darwin Awards are a rhetorical tongue-in-cheek honor that originated in Usenet newsgroup discussions around 1985. They recognize individuals who have supposedly contributed to human evolution by selecting themselves out of the gene pool by dying or becoming sterilized by their own actions.

The project became more formalized with the creation of a website in 1993, followed by a series of books starting in 2000 by Wendy Northcutt. The criterion for the awards states: "In the spirit of Charles Darwin, the Darwin Awards commemorate individuals who protect our gene pool by making the ultimate sacrifice of their own lives. Darwin Award winners eliminate themselves in an extraordinarily idiotic manner, thereby improving our species' chances of long-term survival."

Accidental self-sterilization also qualifies, but the site notes: "Of necessity, the award is usually bestowed posthumously." The candidate is disqualified, though, if "innocent bystanders" are killed in the process, as they might have contributed positively to the gene pool. The logical problem presented by award winners who may have had children is not addressed in the selection process owing to the difficulty of ascertaining a candidate's parental status; the Darwin Award rules state that the presence of offspring does not disqualify a nominee.

== History ==
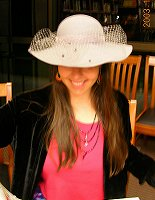
Wendy Northcutt, author of the Darwin Awards website and books

The origin of the Darwin Awards can be traced back to posts on Usenet group discussions as early as 1985. A post on August 7, 1985, describes the awards as being "given posthumously to people who have made the supreme sacrifice to keep their genes out of our pool. Style counts, not everyone who dies from their own stupidity can win." This early post cites an example of a person who tried to break into a vending machine and was crushed to death when he pulled it over on himself. Another widely distributed early story mentioning the Darwin Awards, later determined to be an urban legend by the Arizona Highway Patrol, is the JATO Rocket Car, which describes a man who strapped a jet-assisted take-off unit to his Chevrolet Impala in the Arizona desert and who died on the side of a cliff as his car achieved speeds of 250 to 300 miles per hour (400 to 480 km/h). Wendy Northcutt says the official Darwin Awards website run by Northcutt does its best to confirm all stories submitted, listing them as, "confirmed true by Darwin". Many of the viral emails circulating the Internet, however, are hoaxes and urban legends.

The website and collection of books were started in 1993 by Wendy Northcutt, who studied molecular biology at the University of California, Berkeley, and neurobiology at Stanford University, doing research on cancer and telomerase. In her spare time, she organized chain letters from family members into the original Darwin Awards website hosted in her personal account space at Stanford. She eventually gave up practical research in 1998 and devoted herself full-time to her website and books in September 1999. By 2002, the website received 7 million page hits per month.

Northcutt encountered some difficulty in publishing the first book, since most publishers would only offer her a deal if she agreed to remove the stories from the Internet, but she refused: "It was a community! I could not do that. Even though it might have cost me a lot of money, I kept saying no." She eventually found a publisher who agreed to print a book containing only 10% of the material gathered for the website. The first book turned out to be a success and was listed on The New York Times' best-seller list for 6 months.

Not all of the feedback from the stories Northcutt published was positive, and she occasionally received emails from people who knew the deceased. One such person advised: "This is horrible. It has shocked our community to the core. You should remove this." Northcutt demurred: "I can't. It's just too stupid." Northcutt kept the stories on the website and in her books, citing them as a "funny-but-true safety guide" and mentioning that children who read the book are going to be much more careful around explosives.

The website also awards Honorable Mentions to individuals who survive their misadventures with their reproductive capacity intact. One example of this is Larry Walters, who attached helium-filled weather balloons to a lawn chair and floated far above Long Beach, California, in July 1982. He reached an altitude of 16,000 feet (4,900 m), but survived, to be later fined for crossing controlled airspace. (Walters later fell and died by suicide, the same year Northcutt began the website.) Another notable honorable mention was given to the two men who attempted to burgle the home of footballer Duncan Ferguson (who had an infamous reputation for physical aggression on and off the pitch, including four convictions for assault and who had served six months in Glasgow's Barlinnie Prison) in 2001, with one burglar requiring three days' hospitalisation after being confronted by the player.

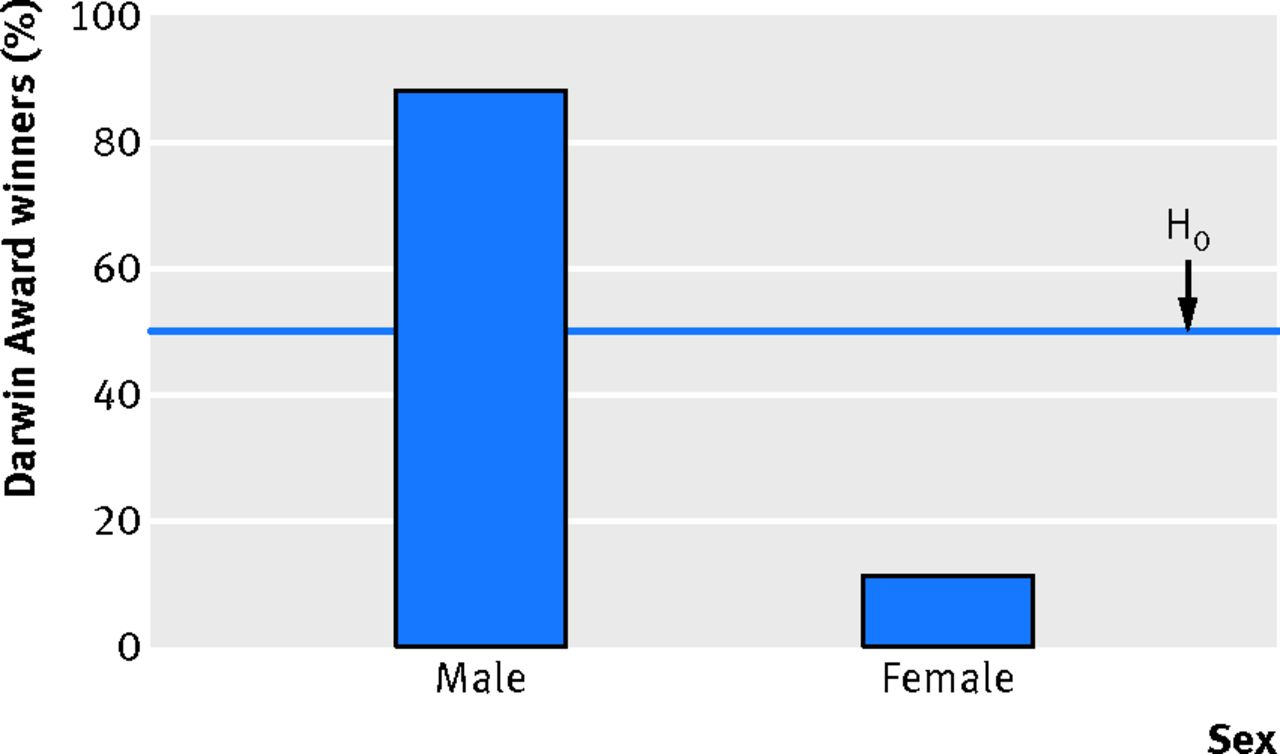
"Male and female Darwin Award winners: Line H_{0} indicates expected percentages under the null hypothesis that males and females are equally idiotic."

A 2014 study published in the British Medical Journal found that between 1995 and 2014, males represented 88.7% of Darwin Award winners (see figure).

The comedy film The Darwin Awards (2006), written and directed by Finn Taylor, was based on the website and many of the Darwin Awards stories.

== Rules ==
Northcutt has stated five requirements for a Darwin Award: Two of them are that the event must be verified to have happened and that the nominee themselves was responsible for the activity. The others are:

=== Nominee must be dead or rendered sterile ===
This may be subject to dispute. Potential awardees may be out of the gene pool because of age; others have already reproduced before their deaths. To avoid debates about the possibility of in vitro fertilization, artificial insemination, or cloning, the original Darwin Awards book applied the following "deserted island" test to potential winners: If the person were unable to reproduce when stranded on a deserted island with a fertile member of the opposite sex, they would be considered sterile. Winners of the award, in general, either are dead or have become unable to use their sexual organs.

=== Astoundingly stupid judgment ===
The candidate's foolishness must be unique and sensational, likely because the award is intended to be funny. A number of foolish but common activities, such as smoking in bed or refusing measles vaccination, are excluded from consideration. In contrast, self-immolation caused by smoking after being administered a flammable ointment in a hospital and specifically told not to smoke is grounds for nomination. One "Honorable Mention" (a man who attempted suicide by swallowing nitroglycerin pills, and then tried to detonate them by running into a wall) is noted to be in this category, despite being intentional and self-inflicted (i.e. attempted suicide), which would normally disqualify the inductee.

=== Capable of sound judgment ===
In 2011, the awards targeted a 16-year-old boy in Leeds who died stealing copper wiring. In 2012, Northcutt made similar light of a 14-year-old girl in Brazil who was killed while leaning out of a school bus window, but she was "disqualified" for the award itself because of the likely public objection owing to the girl's age, which Northcutt asserts is based on "magical thinking".

Under this rule, and for reasons of good taste, individuals whose misfortune was caused by mental impairment or disability are not eligible for a Darwin Award, primarily to avoid mocking or making light of disabled people and to ensure that the awards do not celebrate or trivialize tragedies involving vulnerable individuals. The same rule also disqualifies children under the age of 16 from winning the award.

== Reception ==
The Darwin Awards have received varying levels of scrutiny from the scientific community. In his book Encyclopedia of Evolution, biology professor Stanley A. Rice comments: "Despite the tremendous value of these stories as entertainment, it is unlikely that they represent evolution in action", stating that their stupidity could reflect their upbringing, and is less reflective of intelligence but rather impulsivity. And that impulsivity is a genetic trait in humans that can have evolutionary drawbacks, but remains because it also benefits in avoiding missed opportunities. On an essay in the book The Evolution of Evil, professor Nathan Hallanger acknowledges that the Darwin Awards are meant as black humor, but associates them with the eugenics movement of the early 20th century. University of Oxford biophysicist Sylvia McLain, writing for The Guardian, says that while the Darwin Awards are "clearly meant to be funny", they do not accurately represent how genetics work, further noting "...that 'smart' people do stupid things all the time." Geologist and science communicator Sharon A. Hill has criticized the Darwin Awards on both scientific and ethical grounds, claiming that many factors in addition to genetics impact personal intelligence and judgement. She then says the awards exemplify "ignorance" and "heartlessness".

== Notable recipients ==
- Garry Hoy, who fell from the 24th story of the Toronto-Dominion Centre whilst attempting to demonstrate to a group of students that the windows were unbreakable. His death has been featured in television programs such as 1000 Ways to Die and MythBusters.
- Charles Stephens, the first person to die while attempting to go over Niagara Falls in a barrel.
- John Allen Chau, an American man killed when he attempted to proselytize to the Sentinelese, an uncontacted people living on North Sentinel Island.

== Books ==
- Northcutt, Wendy (2000). The Darwin Awards: Evolution in Action. New York City: Plume. ISBN 978-0-525-94572-7.
- Northcutt, Wendy (2001). The Darwin Awards II: Unnatural Selection. New York City: Plume. ISBN 978-1-101-21896-9.
- Northcutt, Wendy (2003). The Darwin Awards 3: Survival of the Fittest. New York City: Plume. ISBN 978-0-525-94773-8.
- Northcutt, Wendy (2005). The Darwin Awards: The Descent of Man. Running Press Miniature Editions. ISBN 978-0-7624-2561-7.
- Northcutt, Wendy (2005). The Darwin Awards: Felonious Failures. Running Press Miniature Editions. ISBN 978-0-7624-2562-4.
- Northcutt, Wendy (2006). The Darwin Awards 4: Intelligent Design. New York City: Dutton. ISBN 978-1-101-21892-1.
- Northcutt, Wendy (2008). The Darwin Awards V: Next Evolution. New York City: Dutton. ISBN 978-0-14-301033-3.
- Northcutt, Wendy (2008). The Darwin Awards Next Evolution: Chlorinating the Gene Pool. New York City: Dutton. ISBN 978-1-4406-3677-6.
- Northcutt, Wendy (2010). The Darwin Awards: Countdown to Extinction. New York City: Dutton. ISBN 978-1-101-44465-8.

== See also ==
- Accident-proneness – Idea that some people are more likely than others to experience accidents
- List of inventors killed by their own inventions
- Preventable causes of death – Causes of death that could have been avoided
- List of selfie-related injuries and deaths
- List of unusual deaths
- Just-world fallacy – Idea that everyone faces consequence as they deserve
- Schadenfreude
- Death by misadventure
- Herman Cain Award, a similar ironic award
- Ig Nobel Prize
