= List of unusual deaths in the early modern period =

Lists of unusual deaths
Antiquity	Middle Ages	Renaissance	Early modern period
19th century	20th century	21st century	Animal deaths

This list of unusual deaths includes unique or extremely rare circumstances of death recorded throughout the early modern period (defined here as 1600–1799 AD), noted as being unusual by multiple sources.

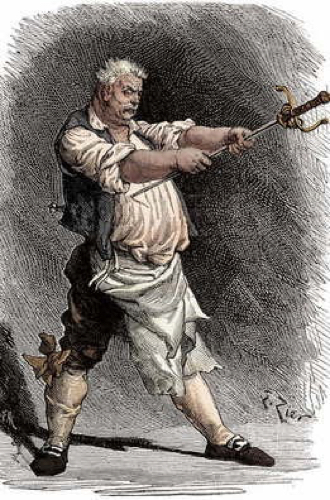
The suicide of François Vatel

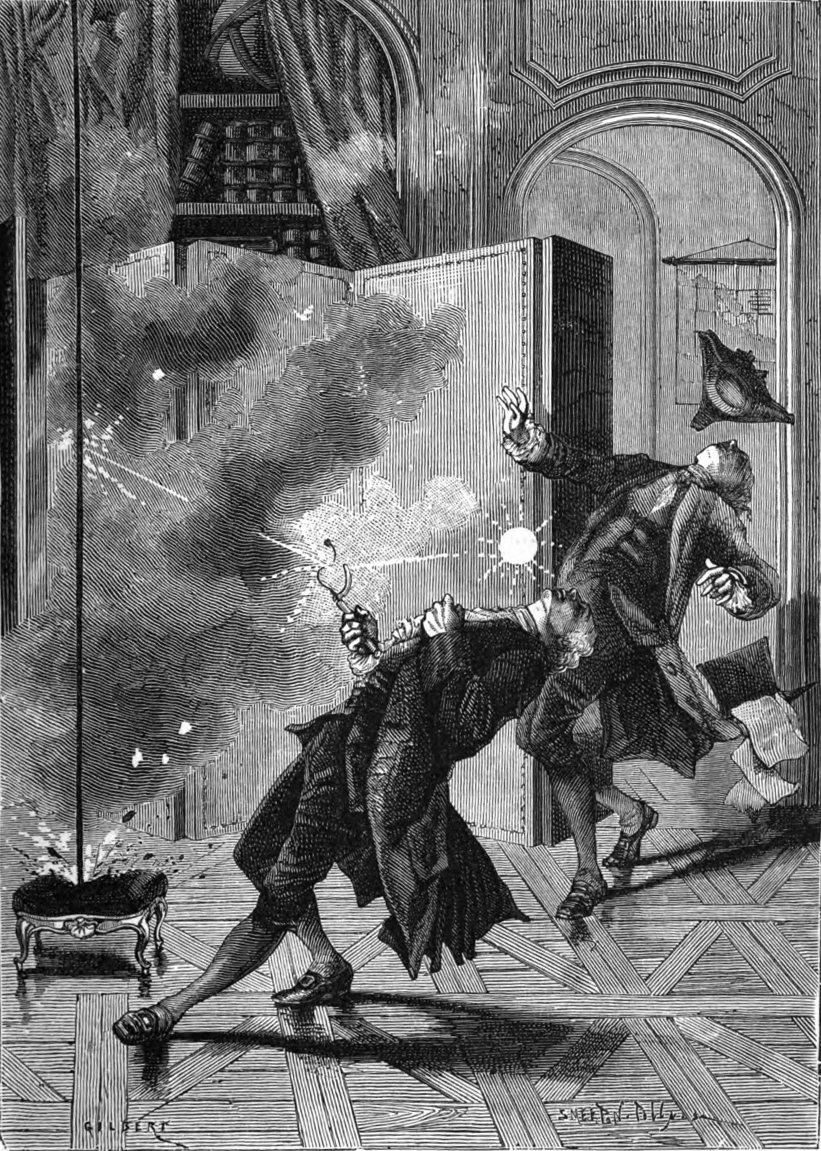
The death of Georg Wilhelm Richmann, killed by ball lightning

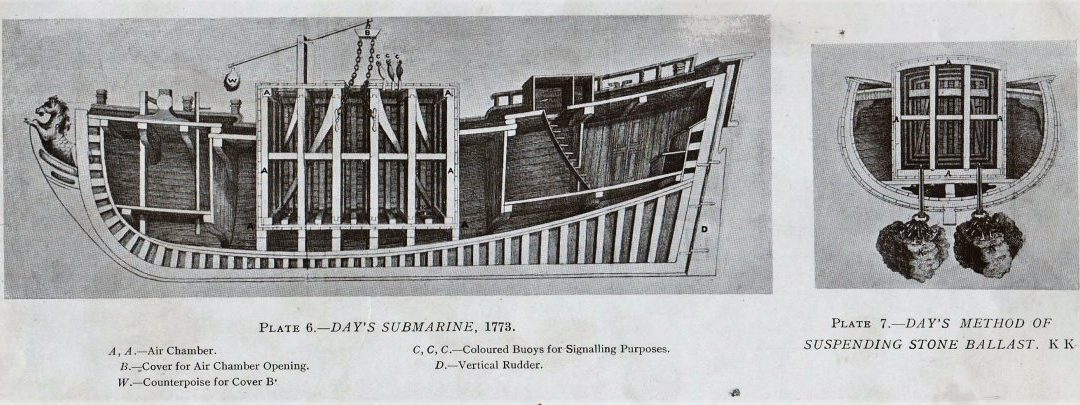
John Day's submarine

== Early modern period ==
Name of person	Image	Date of death	Country	Details
Tycho Brahe		24 October 1601	Kingdom of Bohemia	The Danish astronomer contracted a bladder or kidney ailment after attending a banquet in Prague and died eleven days later. According to Johannes Kepler's first-hand account, Brahe had refused to leave the banquet to relieve himself, because it would have been a breach of etiquette. After he had returned home, he was no longer able to urinate, except eventually in very small quantities and with excruciating pain. Though initially ascribed to a kidney stone, and later still to potential mercury poisoning, modern analyses indicate Brahe's death resulted from a fatal case of uremia caused by an inflamed prostate.
Sir Francis Bacon		9 April 1626	England	John Aubrey reported in Brief Lives that the English philosopher and statesman died of pneumonia after stuffing a chicken carcass with snow to learn whether it could preserve meat.
Jörg Jenatsch		24 January 1639	Three Leagues	The Swiss political leader was assassinated by a person dressed in a bear costume wielding an axe. Legend states that the axe was the same one that Jenatsch had once used to kill a rival.
Sir Arthur Aston		September 1649	Ireland	During the Siege of Drogheda, the Cavalier commander from Reading, England, was beaten to death by Oliver Cromwell's army with his own wooden leg because they suspected gold coins were concealed inside.
Thomas Urquhart		1660	Scotland	The Scottish aristocrat, polymath, and first translator of François Rabelais' writings into English is said to have died laughing upon hearing that Charles II had taken the throne.
François Vatel		24 April 1671	France	The majordomo of Prince Louis II de Bourbon-Condé was responsible for a banquet for 2,000 people hosted in honour of King Louis XIV at the Château de Chantilly, where he died. According to a letter by Madame de Sévigné, Vatel was so distraught about the lateness of the seafood delivery and about other mishaps, that he committed suicide with his sword, and his body was discovered when someone came to tell him of the arrival of the fish.
Molière		17 February 1673	France	The French playwright suffered a pulmonary hemorrhage caused by tuberculosis while playing the part of a hypochondriac in his own play Le malade imaginaire. He disguised his convulsion as part of his performance and finished the show, which ends with his character dead in a chair. After the show, he was carried in the chair to his house, where he died.
Jean-Baptiste Lully		22 March 1687	France	The French composer died of a gangrenous abscess after accidentally piercing his foot with a staff while he was vigorously conducting a Te Deum. It was customary at that time to conduct by banging a staff on the floor. He refused to have his leg amputated so he could still dance.
Pieter Peutemans		1698	Netherlands	The Dutch Golden Age painter had fallen asleep while sketching in an anatomy building when the 1692 Northwestern Europe earthquake struck, causing all the skeletons in the room to shake and appear to attack him. This caused such a shock to his heart that although he was able to recover enough to share the tale, he died soon afterwards.
William III of England		8 March 1702	England	The king of England was riding his horse when it stumbled on a molehill. William fell and broke his collarbone, then contracted pneumonia and died several days later. After he died, Jacobites were said to have toasted in the mole's honour, calling it "the little gentleman in the black velvet waistcoat".
Hannah Twynnoy		23 October 1703	England	The 33-year-old barmaid at the White Lion Inn was mauled to death by a tiger in Malmesbury, Wiltshire. She was the first person to be killed by a tiger in British history.
Frederick, Prince of Wales		31 March 1751	England	The son of George II of Great Britain and father of George III died of a pulmonary embolism, but was commonly claimed to have been killed by being struck by a cricket ball.
Professor Georg Wilhelm Richmann		6 August 1753	Russia	The Russian physicist was killed when a globe of ball lightning which he created in his laboratory struck him in the forehead.
Henry Hall		8 December 1755	England	The 94-year-old British lighthouse keeper died several days after fighting a fire at Rudyerd's Tower, during which molten lead from the roof fell down his throat. His autopsy revealed that "the diaphragmatic upper mouth of the stomach greatly inflamed and ulcerated, and the tuncia in the lower part of the stomach burnt; and from the great cavity of it took out a great piece of lead ... which weighed exactly seven ounces, five drachms and eighteen grains". The piece of lead is currently in the collection of the National Museum of Scotland.
Stanisław Leszczyński		23 February 1766	Holy Roman Empire	The duke of Lorraine and former king of Poland died from wounds after his silk attire had caught fire from a spark while he was sitting near the fireplace in his Château de Lunéville.
John Day		20 June 1774	England	The English carpenter and wheelwright was the first human known to have died in an accident with a submarine. Day submerged himself in Plymouth Sound in a wooden diving chamber attached to a sloop named the Maria and never resurfaced.
Frantisek Kotzwara		2 September 1791	England	While in London, the 61-year-old Czech violinist visited a prostitute named Susannah Hill and requested his neck be tied with a noose around a door knob. He died after the sexual intercourse of erotic asphyxiation.
Samuel Spencer		20 March 1793	United States	The 59-year-old North Carolina lawyer and former colonel was sleeping on a porch in Anson County while wearing a red cap. Spencer's bobbling head drew the attention of a turkey, which viewed Spencer as another turkey and fatally wounded him with its talons. (Note: This source incorrectly gives Spencer's age at death as 60.)
