= List of unusual deaths in the Middle Ages =

Lists of unusual deaths
Antiquity	Middle Ages	Renaissance	Early modern period
19th century	20th century	21st century	Animal deaths

This list of unusual deaths includes unique or extremely rare circumstances of death recorded throughout the Middle Ages (defined here as 500–1399 AD), noted as being unusual by multiple sources.

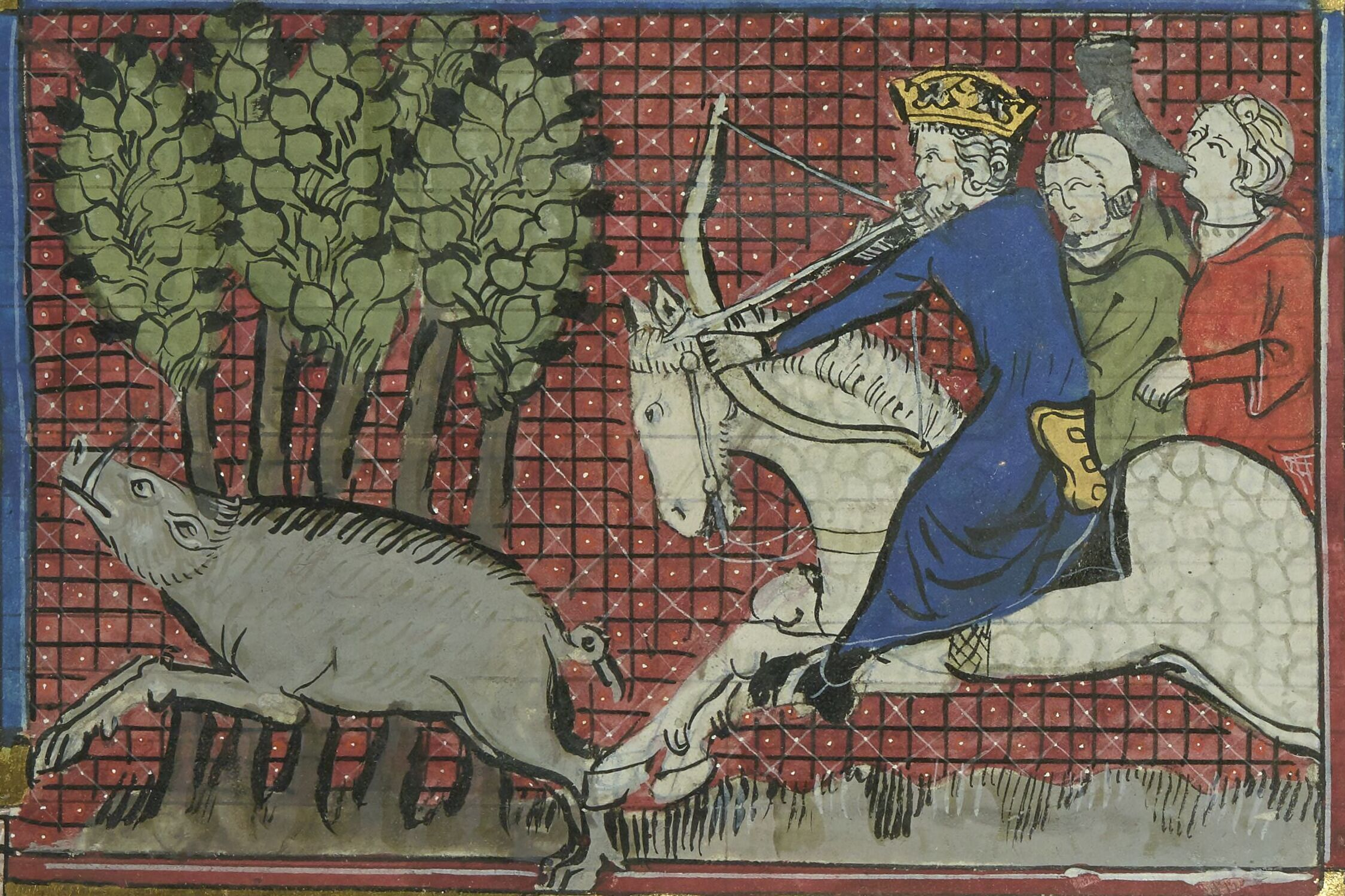
John II Komnenos on a boar hunt

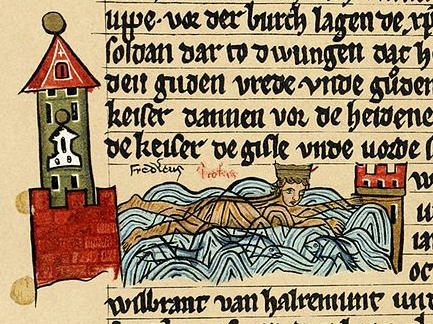
Frederick Barbarossa's strange drowning gave rise to legends that he was still alive

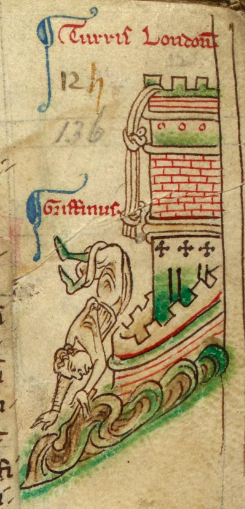
Gruffudd ap Llywelyn ab Iorwerth falls to his death from the Tower of London

== Middle Ages ==
Name of person	Image	Date of death	Details
Li Bai		762	According to popular legend, the Chinese poet got drunk while riding his boat along the Yangtze River and tried to hug the moon's reflection. He then fell off and drowned.
Louis III of France		5 August 882	The king of West Francia died aged around 18 at Saint-Denis. While mounting his horse to pursue a girl who was running to seek refuge in her father's house, he hit his head on the lintel of a low door and fell, fracturing his skull.
Basil I		29 August 886	The Byzantine emperor's belt was entangled between antlers of a deer during a hunt and the animal subsequently dragged him for 16 miles (26 km) through the woods. Because of this accident, Basil contracted fever and he died shortly afterwards.
Sigurd the Mighty		892	The second Earl of Orkney strapped the head of his defeated foe Máel Brigte to his horse's saddle. Brigte's teeth rubbed against Sigurd's leg as he rode, causing a fatal infection, according to the Old Norse Heimskringla and Orkneyinga sagas.
Hatto II		18 January 970	The archbishop of Mainz is claimed in legend to have been punished for his cruelty to the poor by being eaten alive by rodents.
Edmund Ironside		30 November 1016	According to Henry of Huntington, the English king was stabbed while on a toilet by an assassin hiding underneath.
Béla I of Hungary		11 September 1063	After the Holy Roman Empire decided to launch a military expedition against Hungary to restore his nephew Solomon to the throne, the Hungarian king was seriously injured when "his throne broke beneath him" in his manor at Dömös, later succumbing at a creek near Nagykanizsa.
Junior King Philip of France		13 October 1131	The French prince who co-ruled with Louis VI died while riding through Paris when his horse tripped over a black pig that was running out of a dung heap.
Henry I of England		1 December 1135	According to Henry of Huntington, while visiting relatives, the English king ate too many lampreys against his physician's advice, causing a pain in his gut which led to his death.
John II Komnenos		1 April 1143	The Byzantine Emperor cut himself with a poisoned arrow during a boar hunt, subsequently dying from sepsis.
Pope Adrian IV		1 September 1159	The only Englishman to serve as Pope reportedly died after choking on a fly while drinking spring water.
Victims of the Erfurt latrine disaster		26 July 1184	While Henry VI, the King of Germany, was holding an informal assembly at the Petersburg Citadel in Erfurt, the combined weight of the assembled nobles caused the wooden second storey floor of the building to collapse. Most of the nobles fell through into the latrine cesspit below the ground floor, where about 60 of them drowned in liquid excrement.
Frederick Barbarossa		10 June 1190	While leading the German army on the Third Crusade, the Holy Roman Emperor unexpectedly drowned while bathing in the Saleph.
Enguerrand III, Lord of Coucy		1 January 1242	The French nobleman died at 60 years of age when, during a rough ride, he fell off his horse and impaled himself on his own sword.
Gruffudd ap Llywelyn ab Iorwerth		1 March 1244	The first-born son of Llywelyn the Great died while attempting to lower himself from the Tower of London in an escape attempt. The rope, made out of sheets and other fabrics, snapped, and his neck was broken in the fall, according to English monk and chronicler, Matthew Paris.
Al-Musta'sim		20 February 1258	The last Abbasid Caliph of Baghdad was executed by his Mongol captors by being rolled up in a rug and then trampled by horses.
Edward II of England		21 September 1327	The English king was rumoured to have been murdered after being deposed and imprisoned by his wife Isabella and her lover Roger Mortimer, by having a horn pushed into his anus through which a red-hot iron was inserted, burning out his internal organs without marking his body. However, there is no real academic consensus on the manner of Edward II's death, and it has been plausibly argued that the story is propaganda.
Charles II of Navarre		1 January 1387	The contemporary chronicler Froissart relates that the king of Navarre, known as "Charles the Bad", suffering from illness in old age, was ordered by his physician to be tightly sewn into a linen sheet soaked in distilled spirits. The highly flammable sheet accidentally caught fire, and he later died of his injuries.

== Works cited ==
- Barber, Richard; Barker, Juliet (1989). Tournaments: Jousts, Chivalry and Pageants in the Middle Ages. Boydell. pp. 134, 139. ISBN 978-0-85115-470-1.
