= List of unusual deaths in antiquity =

Lists of unusual deaths
Antiquity	Middle Ages	Renaissance	Early modern period
19th century	20th century	21st century	Animal deaths

This list of unusual deaths includes unique or extremely rare circumstances of death recorded throughout ancient history, noted as being unusual by multiple sources.

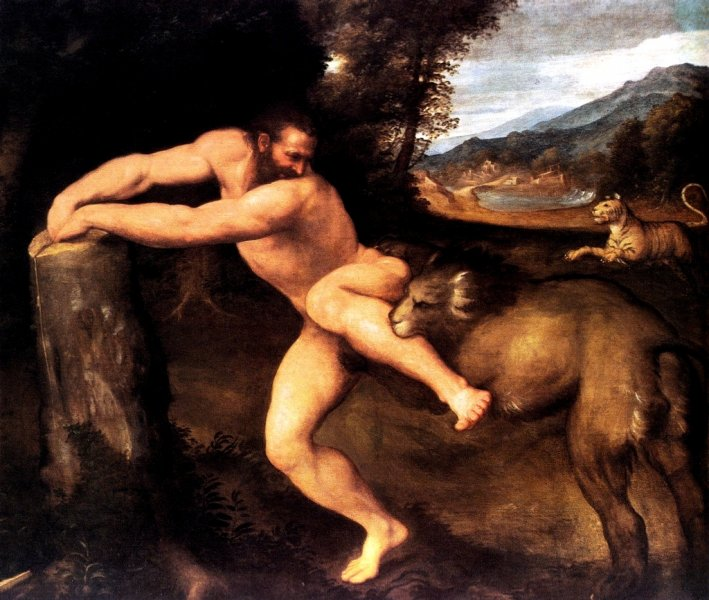
Milo of Croton, killed by lions as in later legends

The death of Aeschylus, killed by a tortoise dropped onto his head by an eagle, illustrated in the 15th-century Florentine Picture-Chronicle by Baccio Baldini

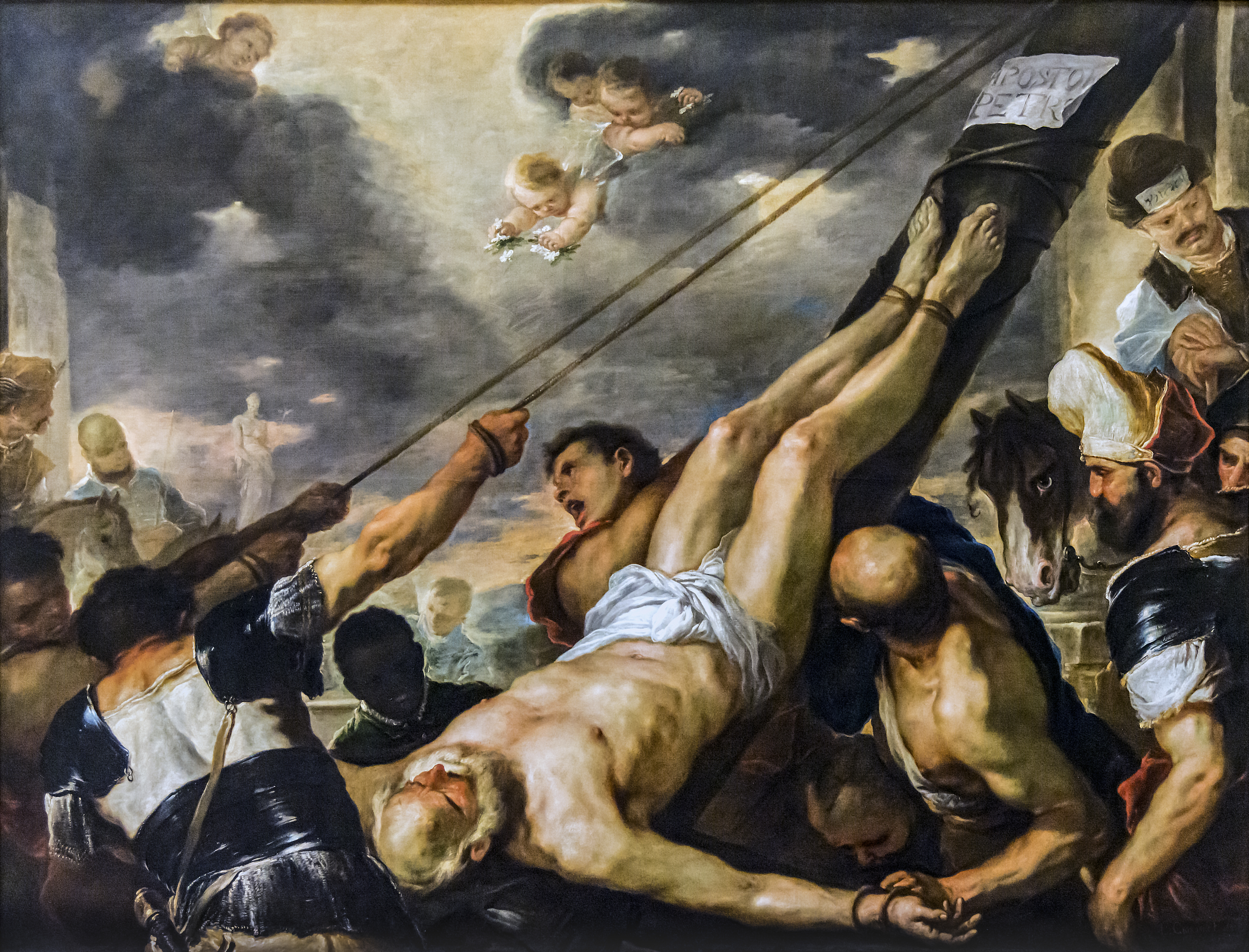
The crucifixion of Saint Peter as depicted by Luca Giordano

== Antiquity ==
Name of person	Image	Date of death	Details
Sisera		1200 or 1235 BC	According to Judges 4 – 5, the commander of the Canaanite army for King Jabin of Hazor was killed in his sleep when the Kenite woman, Jael, stabbed him in the temple with a tent peg.
Abimelech Ben Gideon		1126 BC	According to Judges 9, the king of Shechem and son of Gideon was killed in the city of Thebez by a woman who threw a millstone on his head which crushed his skull.
Draco of Athens		c. 620 BC	The Athenian lawmaker was reportedly smothered to death by gifts of cloaks and hats showered upon him by appreciative citizens at a theatre in Aegina, Greece.
Duke Jing of Jin		581 BC	The Chinese ruler was warned by a shaman that he would not live to see the new wheat harvest, to which he responded by executing the shaman. However, when the duke was about to eat the wheat, he felt the need to visit the bathroom, where he fell through the hole and drowned.
Arrhichion of Phigalia		564 BC	The Greek pankratiast caused his own death during the Olympic finals. Held by his unidentified opponent in a stranglehold and unable to free himself, Arrhichion kicked his opponent, causing him so much pain from a foot/ankle injury that the opponent made the sign of defeat to the umpires, but at the same time Arrhichion suffered a fatally broken neck. Since the opponent had conceded defeat, Arrhichion was proclaimed the victor posthumously.
Sisamnes		525 BC	The corrupt Persian judge was flayed alive by Cambyses II for accepting a bribe.
Milo of Croton		6th century BC	The Olympic champion wrestler's hands reportedly became trapped when he tried to split a tree apart; he was then devoured by wolves (or, in later versions, lions).
Zeuxis		5th century BC	The Greek painter died of laughter while painting an elderly woman.
Anacreon		c. 485 BC	The Greek poet, known for works in celebration of wine, choked to death on a grape stone according to Pliny the Elder. The 1911 Encyclopædia Britannica suggests that "the story has an air of mythical adaptation to the poet's habits".
Heraclitus of Ephesus		c. 475 BC	According to one account given by Diogenes Laertius, the Greek philosopher was said to have been devoured by dogs after smearing himself with cow manure in an attempt to cure his dropsy.
Aeschylus		c. 455 BC	According to Valerius Maximus, the eldest of the three great Athenian tragedians was killed by a tortoise dropped by an eagle that had mistaken his bald head for a rock suitable for shattering the shell of the reptile. Pliny the Elder, in his Natural History, adds that Aeschylus had been staying outdoors to avert a prophecy that he would be killed that day "by the fall of a house".
Empedocles of Akragas		c. 430 BC	According to Diogenes Laertius, the Pre-Socratic philosopher from Sicily, who, in one of his surviving poems, declared himself to have become a "divine being... no longer mortal", tried to prove he was an immortal god by leaping into Mount Etna, an active volcano. The Roman poet Horace also alludes to this legend.
Sogdianus		423 BC	The ruler of the Achaemenid Empire was captured by his half-brother Ochus, who had him executed by being suffocated by ash.
Polydamas of Skotoussa		5th century BC	The Thessalian pankratiast, and victor in the 93rd Olympiad (408 BC), was in a cave with friends when the roof began to crumble. Believing his immense strength could prevent the cave-in, he tried to support the roof with his shoulders as the rocks crashed down around him, but was crushed to death.
Sophocles		c. 406 BC	A number of "remarkable" legends concerning the death of another of the three great Athenian tragedians are recorded in the late antique Life of Sophocles. According to one legend, he choked to death on an unripe grape. Another says that he died of joy after hearing that his last play had been successful. A third account reports that he died of suffocation, after reading aloud a lengthy monologue from the end of his play Antigone, without pausing to take a breath for punctuation.
Mithridates		401 BC	The Persian soldier who embarrassed his king, Artaxerxes II, by boasting of killing his rival, Cyrus the Younger (who was the brother of Artaxerxes II), was executed by scaphism. The king's physician, Ctesias, reported that Mithridates survived the insect torture for 17 days.
Anaxarchus		320 BC	According to Diogenes Laertius, the Greek philosopher gained the enmity of the tyrannical ruler of Cyprus, Nicocreon, for an inappropriate joke he made about tyrants at a banquet in 331 BC. When Anaxarchus visited Cyprus, Nicocreon ordered him to be pounded to death in a mortar. During the torture Anaxarchus said to Nicocreon, "Just pound the bag of Anaxarchus, you do not pound Anaxarchus." Nicocreon then threatened to cut his tongue out; Anaxarchus bit it off and spat it at the ruler's face.
Antiphanes		c. 310 BC	According to the Suda, the renowned Greek comic poet of the Middle Attic comedy died after being struck by a pear.
King Wu of Qin		307 BC	The king of the Chinese state of Qin reportedly challenged his friend Meng Yue to a lifting contest. When Wu tried to lift a giant bronze pot believed to have been cast for Yu the Great, it crushed his leg, inflicting fatal injuries. Meng Yue and his family were sentenced to death.
Agathocles of Syracuse		289 BC	The Greek tyrant of Syracuse was murdered with a poisoned toothpick.
Pyrrhus of Epirus		272 BC	During the Battle of Argos, the king of Epirus, Pyrrhus, was fighting a Macedonian soldier named Zopyrus in the street when the elderly mother of the soldier dropped a roof tile onto Pyrrhus' head, breaking his spine and rendering him paralyzed. He was then decapitated by Zopyrus.
Zeno of Citium		c. 262 BC	The Greek philosopher from Citium, Cyprus, tripped and fell as he was leaving the school, breaking his toe. Striking the ground with his fist, he quoted the line from the Niobe, "I come, I come, why dost thou call for me?" He died on the spot through holding his breath.
Qin Shi Huang		August 210 BC	The first emperor of China, whose artifacts and treasures include the Terracotta Army, died after ingesting several pills of mercury, in the belief that it would grant him immortality.
Chrysippus of Soli		c. 206 BC	One ancient account of the death of the third-century BC Greek Stoic philosopher tells that he died laughing at his own joke after he saw a donkey eating his figs; he told a slave to give the donkey neat wine to drink with which to wash them down, and then, "...having laughed too much, he died" (Diogenes Laërtius 7.185). (Note: Valerius Maximus tells the same story about the death of the Athenian poet and playwright Philemon (d. c. 262 BC).)
Eleazar Avaran		c. 163 BC	The brother of Judas Maccabeus; according to 1 Maccabees 6:46, during the Battle of Beth Zechariah, Eleazar spied an armored war elephant which he believed to be carrying the Seleucid emperor Antiochus V Eupator. After thrusting his spear in battle into its belly, it collapsed and fell on top of Eleazar, killing him instantly.
Quintus Lutatius Catulus		87 BC	After his former comrade-in-arms Gaius Marius took control of Rome and had him prosecuted for a capital offence, the Roman Republic consul shut himself inside his house, which was heated to a high temperature and daubed with lime, thus suffocating himself.
Cleopatra, Iras, and Charmion		August 30 BC	Although there exist several accounts of how the 39-year-old last queen of the Ptolemaic Kingdom died, the most widespread one is that she killed herself with an asp (a viper), alongside two of her handmaidens.
Tiberius Claudius Drusus		c. 20 AD	According to Suetonius, the eldest son of the future Roman emperor Claudius died while playing with a pear. Having tossed the pear high in the air, he caught it in his mouth when it came back, but he choked on it, dying of asphyxia.
Saint Peter		c. 64–68 AD	When Nero ordered his execution, the apostle of Jesus requested to be crucified upside down, as he considered himself unworthy to die in the same way Jesus had.
Cassian of Imola		13 August 363 AD	The pious schoolteacher was sentenced to death by Julian the Apostate and was handed over to his pupils to carry out the deed, which they did by binding him to a stake and stabbing him with their pens.
Valentinian I		17 November 375 AD	The Roman emperor suffered a stroke which was provoked by yelling at foreign envoys in anger.
Attila		c. 453 AD	The leader of the Huns reportedly died on his wedding night by choking on his own blood, which flowed into his mouth from a nosebleed.

== Works cited ==
- Laërtius, Diogenes. "The Stoics: Zeno" . Lives of the Eminent Philosophers. Vol. 2:7. Translated by Hicks, Robert Drew (Two volume ed.). Loeb Classical Library. § 1–160.
