= Lists of unusual deaths =

These lists of unusual deaths consist of unique or extremely rare circumstances of death recorded throughout history and noted as being unusual by multiple sources.

- List of unusual animal deaths
- List of unusual deaths in antiquity
- List of unusual deaths in the Middle Ages
- List of unusual deaths in the Renaissance
- List of unusual deaths in the early modern period
- List of unusual deaths in the 19th century
- List of unusual deaths in the 20th century
- List of unusual deaths in the 21st century

The death of Aeschylus, killed by a tortoise dropped onto his head by an eagle, illustrated in the 15th-century Florentine Picture-Chronicle by Baccio Baldini

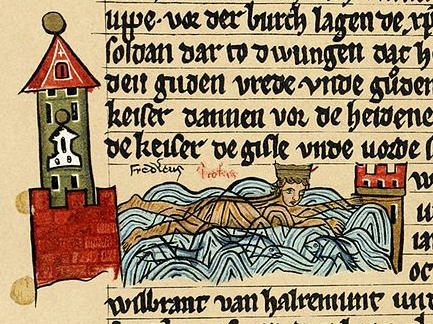
Frederick Barbarossa's strange drowning gave rise to legends that he was still alive

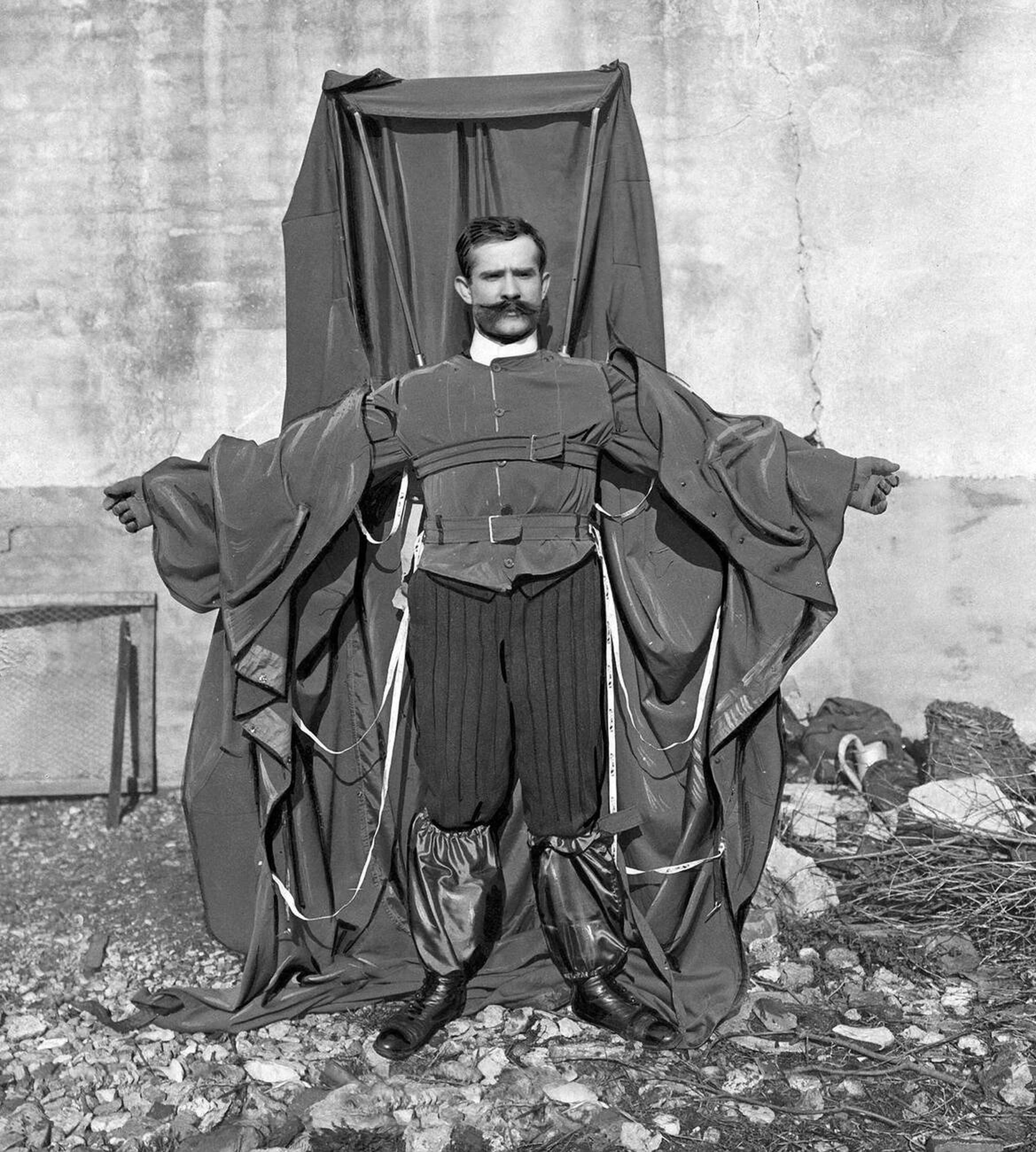
Franz Reichelt, known as the "Flying Tailor", prior to his death testing an early wingsuit

== See also ==
- Autoerotic fatality
- Darwin Awards
- Death by coconut
- Death by vending machine
- Death during consensual sex
- Death from laughter
- Execution by elephant
- Spontaneous human combustion
- 1000 Ways to Die
- Curious and Unusual Deaths
- Stupid Deaths, a recurring segment in the television adaptation of Horrible Histories

=== Related lists ===
- List of association footballers who died while playing
- List of causes of death by rate
- List of deaths due to injuries sustained in boxing
- List of entertainers who died during a performance
- List of inventors killed by their own invention
- List of last words § Ironic last words
- Lists of people by cause of death
- List of people executed for witchcraft
- List of people who died on the toilet
- Lists of people who disappeared
- List of political self-immolations
- List of premature obituaries
- List of racing cyclists and pacemakers with a cycling-related death
- List of selfie-related injuries and deaths
- Toilet-related injuries and deaths
- United States amusement park accidents
- Wheel-well stowaway § List of wheel-well stowaways
