= Dublin whiskey fire =

1875 fire in Dublin

Coordinates: 53.338°N 6.279°W

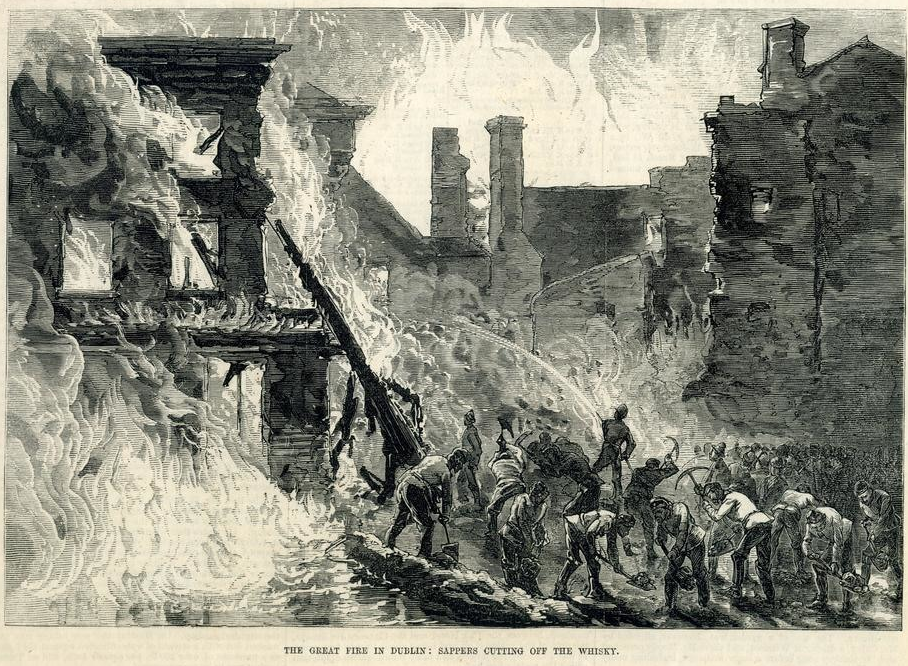
An illustration of the Dublin whiskey fire in The Illustrated London News, 1875

On the night of 18 June 1875 a fire broke out in a whiskey storehouse in the Liberties area of Dublin. The escaped whiskey formed a burning river six inches (15 cm) deep that is said to have flowed as far as the Coombe, destroying 35 houses and killing several pigs. While there were no human fatalities as a direct result of the fire or flood, 13 people died of alcohol poisoning after drinking from the stream of whiskey, which was of undiluted cask strength. Total property damage was estimated at over £100,000, of which the lost whiskey constituted £54,000.

== Origin ==
The fire is believed to have started in Laurence Malone's bonded storehouse on the corner of Ardee Street, where 5,000 hogsheads (262,500 imperial gallons or 1,193,000 litres or 315,200 US gallons) of whiskey were being stored to a value of £54,000 (equivalent to £6.67 million in 2024). The exact cause of the fire is unknown, but it is believed to have started between 4:35 pm when the storehouse was checked, and 8:30 pm when the alarm was raised. At 9:30 pm the barrels within the storehouse began to explode with heat, sending a stream of whiskey flowing through the doors and windows of the burning building.

== Spread ==
The stream of whiskey first stretched down Cork Street, turning onto Ardee Street and catching a house on Chamber Street, then continued further to Mill Street where it quickly demolished a row of small houses.

== Human reaction ==
People living in the area were first alerted to the fire by the sounds of squealing pigs from nearby livestock pens that had caught fire, and this is said to have contributed to a surprisingly rapid evacuation which was later commended by members of the emergency services as well as the Lord Mayor of Dublin at the time, Peter Paul McSwiney. He is quoted as saying:

The time given for escape in some places during the progress of the fire was so short, I was apprehensive that some people should be left in danger in the garrets and cellars of the district. But on inquiry I was happy to learn that no life was lost during the great conflagration.

During the evacuation many people gathered by the streams of whiskey, filling any vessel at hand with the substance. "Caps, porringers, and other vessels" were all gathered to collect the burning liquid, resulting in 24 hospitalisations due to alcohol poisoning and 13 subsequent fatalities.

== See also ==
- List of non-water floods
