= Hans Staininger (mayor) =

Burgomaster of Braunau am Inn (now Austria)

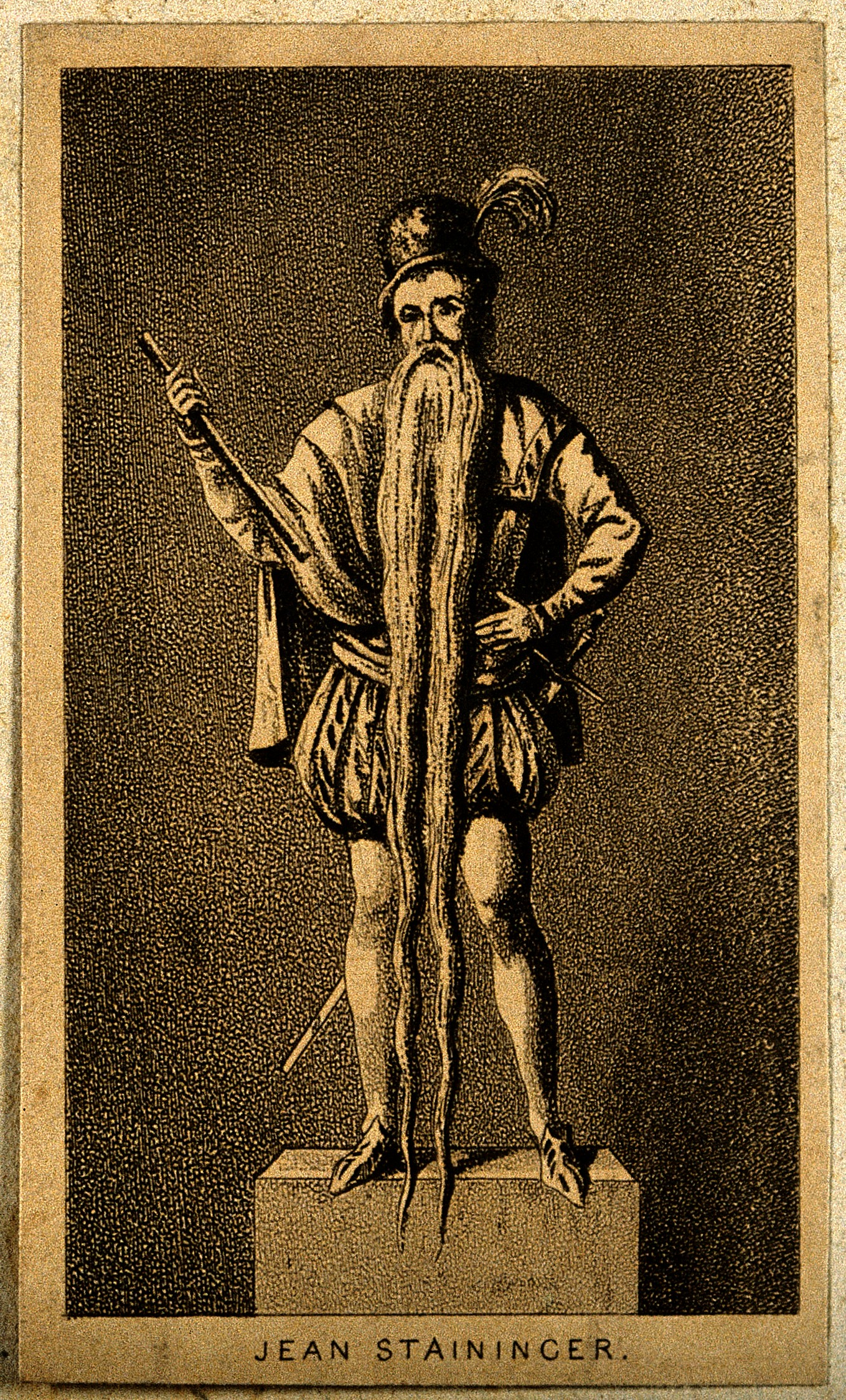
- Born: 1508/1540; Pfarrkirchen, Bavaria, Holy Roman Empire
- Died: September 28, 1567; Braunau am Inn, Bavaria, Holy Roman Empire
- Other names: Hans Steininger, Johann Staininger
- Occupation: Burgomaster
- Known for: Having the world's longest beard until Hans Langseth

Hans Staininger or Steininger (1508/1540 – September 28, 1567) was the burgomaster of Braunau am Inn (then Bavaria, now Austria) who died when he broke his neck by tripping over his own beard. The beard, which was 4.5 feet (1.4 m) long at the time, was usually kept rolled up in a leather pouch.

== Biography ==
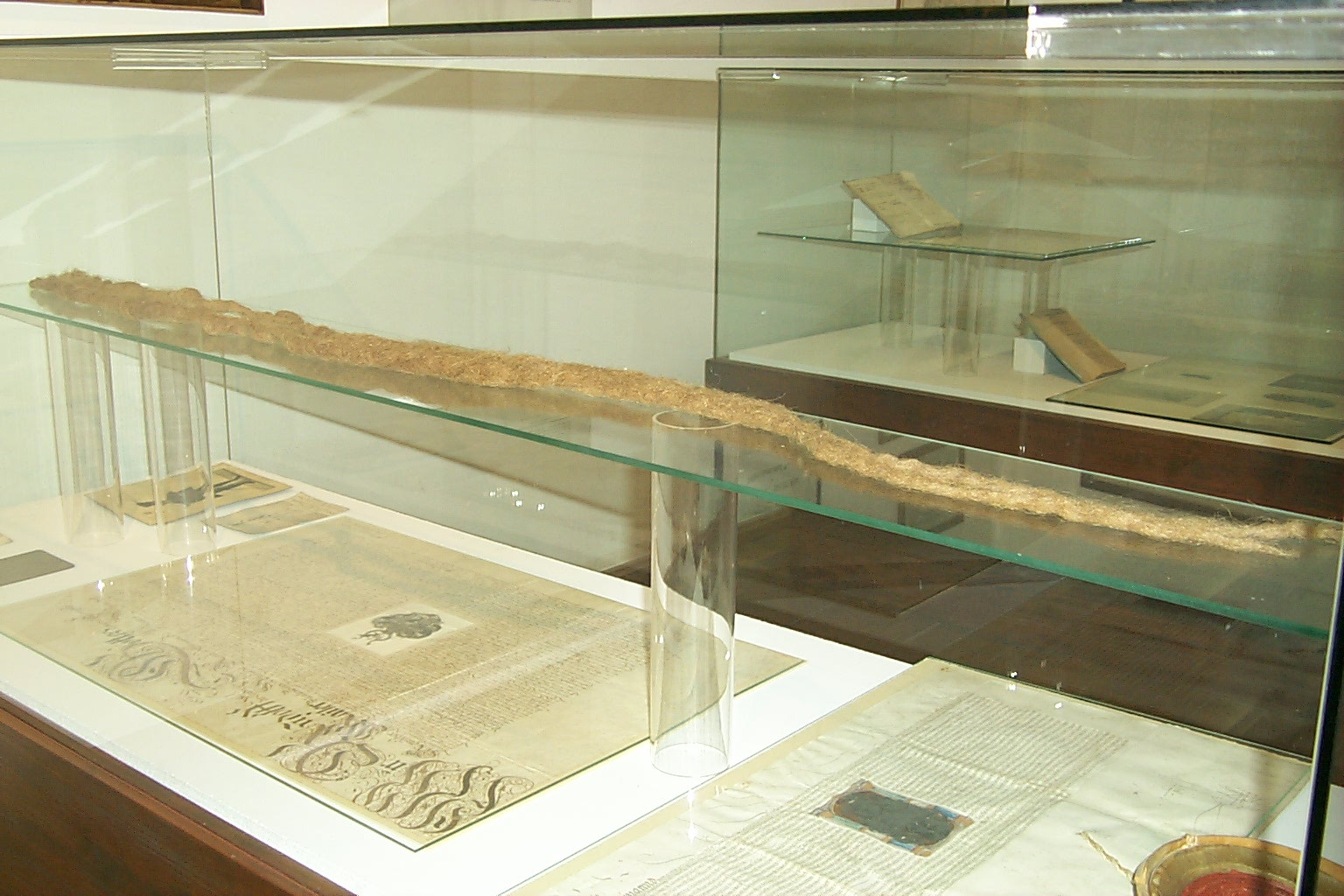
Staininger's beard in 2006

According to Benedikt Pillwein and Joseph Kyselak, Hans Staininger was born in the city of Pfarrkirchen and was elected as the burgomaster of Braunau am Inn six times throughout his life. He was famous for having the longest beard in the world at the time, with a length of 4.5 feet (1.4 m) On September 28, 1567, Staininger's house was set ablaze and while trying to escape, he tripped on his beard and accidentally snapped his own neck. Following his death, his beard was taken and given to the Staininger family for several generations. In 1911, the Staininger family donated the beard to the District Museum in Herzogsburg in Lower Austria where it remains (as of December 2025).
