= Death by vending machine =

Cause of accidental death

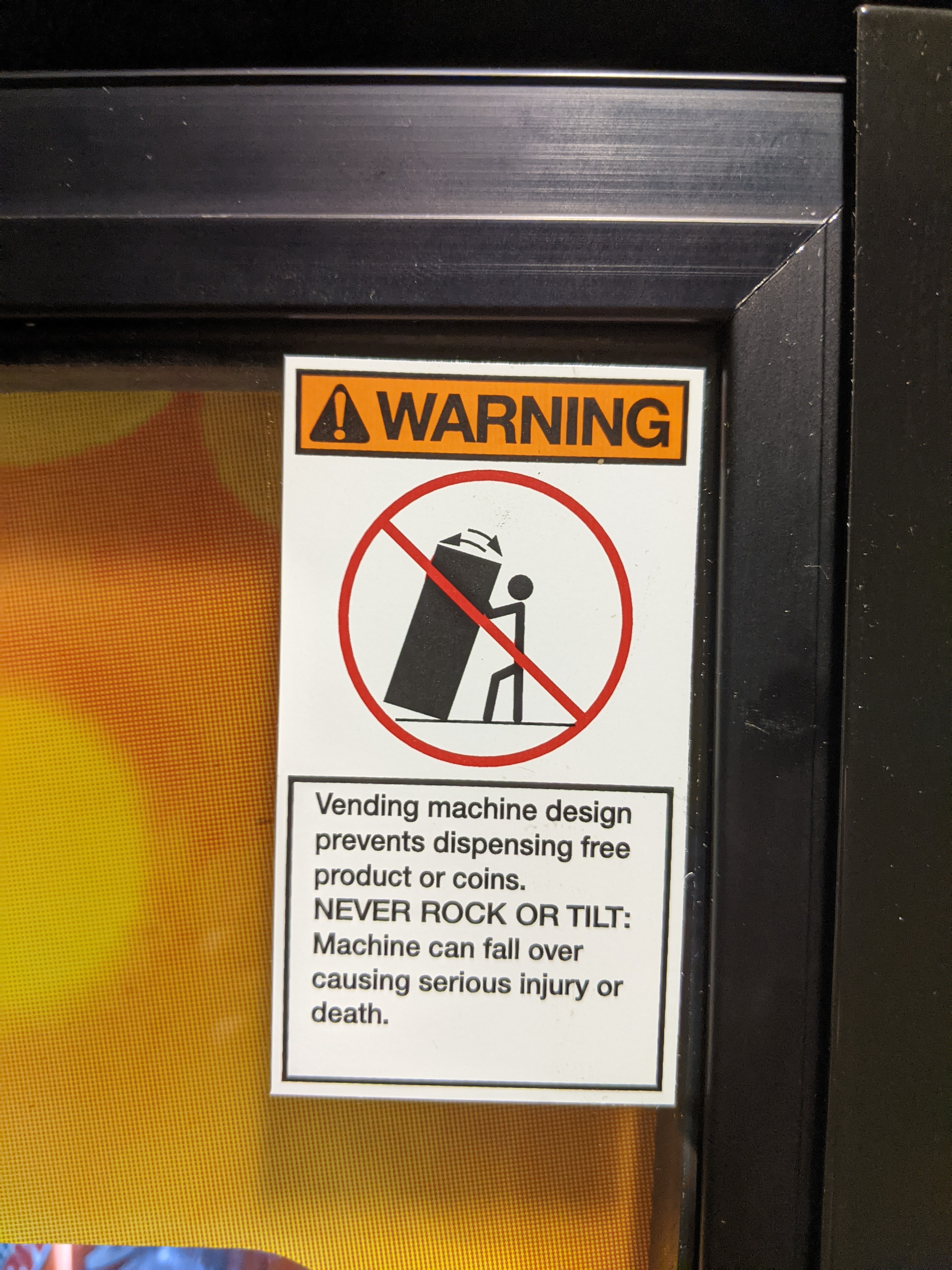
Warning stickers like this one began to appear on vending machines in the 1990s.

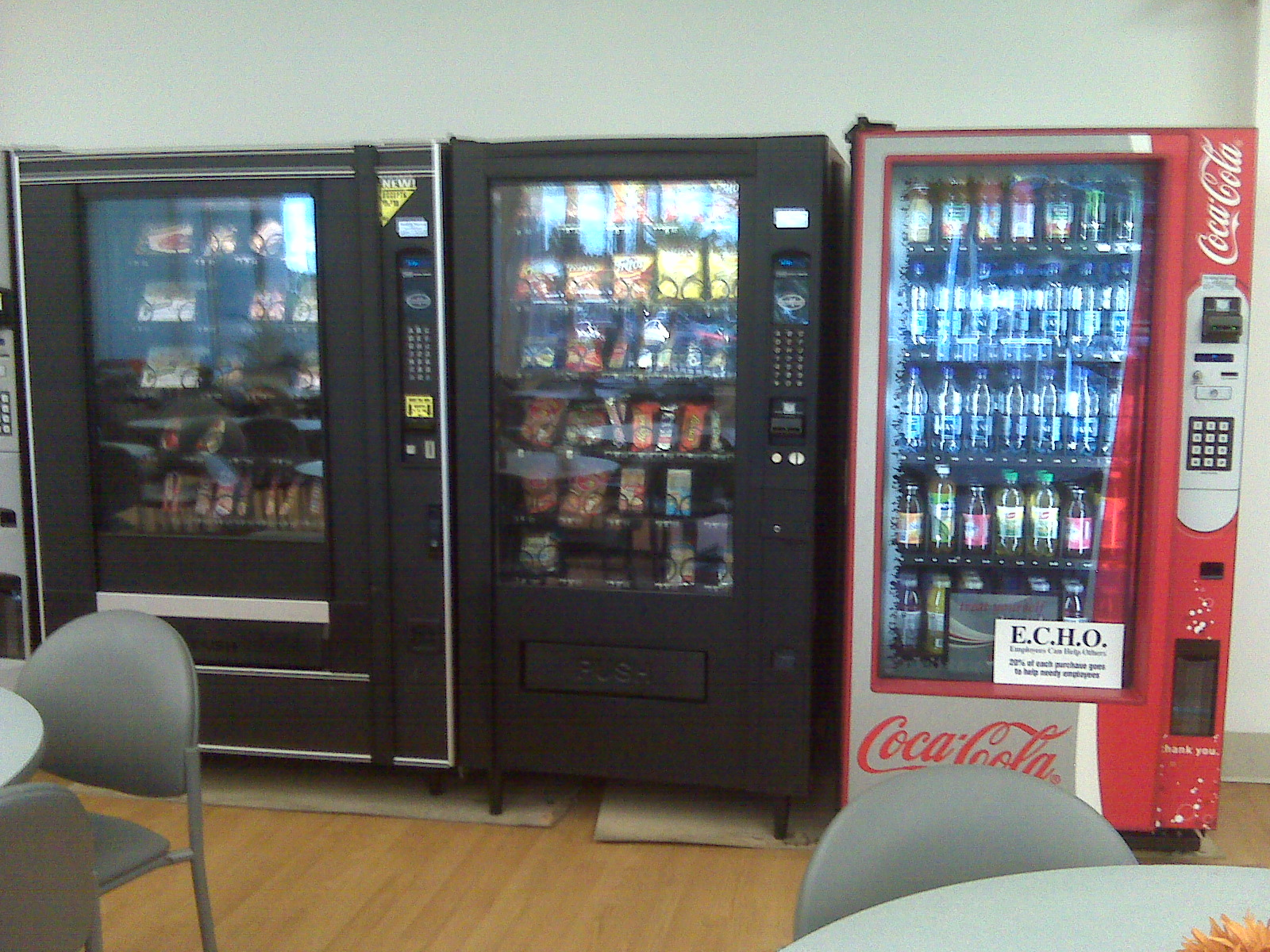
Full size vending machines can weigh over 1,000 pounds (450 kg), creating a risk of serious injury or death if tilted until they fall over.

Rocking or tilting vending machines has been known to cause serious injury or death if the heavy machines fall over.

Users may rock machines in order to obtain free products, release stuck products, or obtain change. The U.S. Consumer Product Safety Commission found in a 1995 study that at least 37 deaths and 113 injuries had occurred due to falling vending machines from 1978 to 1995. This resulted in a voluntary campaign from vending machine manufacturers to warn that rocking or tilting the machines could cause serious injury or death, including placing warning labels on all machines. The U.S. military started putting warning labels on machines in the late 1980s after a number of incidents on military installations.

The vast majority of injuries and deaths have happened to men.

The argument that death by a vending machine is more likely to occur than something like winning the Powerball lottery has drawn more attention to these unusual deaths. One 2012 report states that the odds of winning Powerball are 1 in 175 million, versus 1 in 112 million of getting killed by a vending machine. A similar comparison is often drawn to emphasize the rare occurrence of lethal shark attacks, or wild bear encounters.

== In popular culture ==
In the "University Life" expansion pack for The Sims 3 and the "Snowy Escape" pack for The Sims 4, players can cause characters to violently shake a vending machine, leading to them being crushed to death.

In an episode of the TV show Community, "Basic Story", an inspector checks the college's vending machines to ensure that they will not fall over on students.

In the film Final Destination Bloodlines, a character is killed by a metal coil that is launched from a vending machine after being pulled by the magnetic field of an MRI scanner.

== See also ==
- List of unusual deaths
- Suicide booth
