= Anglo-French (automobile) =

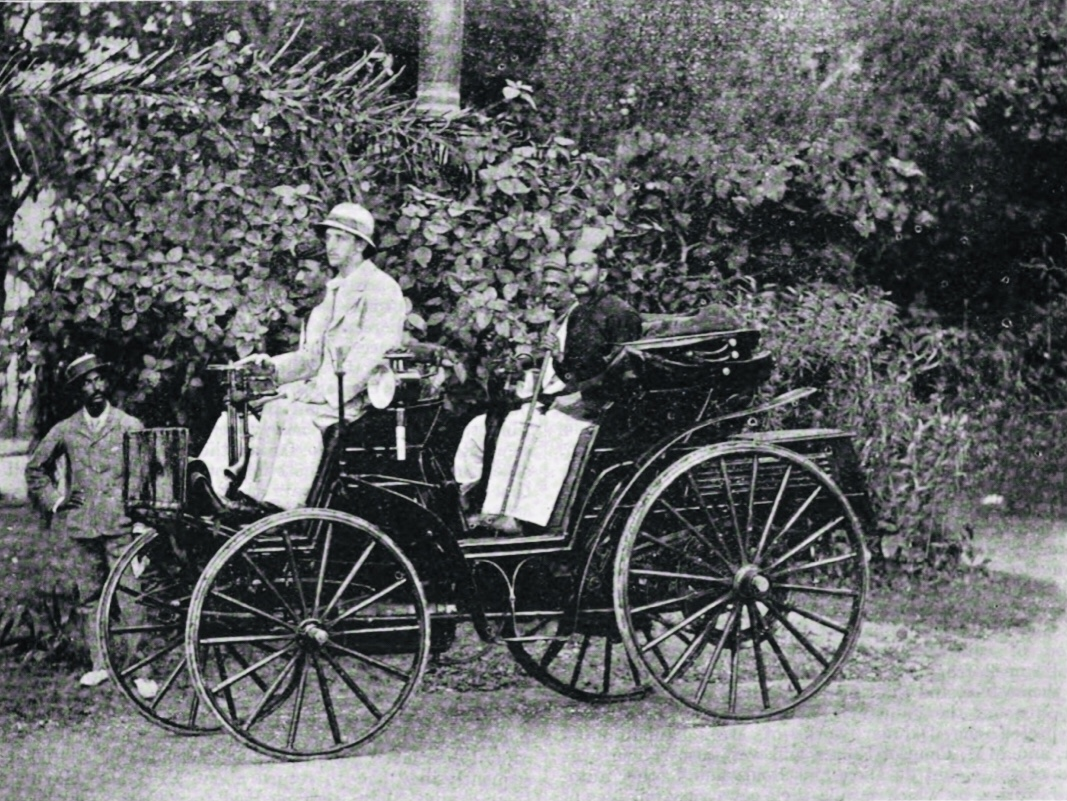
Anglo-French (1897)

The Anglo-French was an English automobile manufactured by Leon l'Hollier's Anglo-French Motor Carriage Company of Birmingham from 1896 to 1897; the cars were essentially Roger-Benz vehicles modified for the British market.

== See also ==
- List of car manufacturers of the United Kingdom
