= Cocaine Bear (bear) =

American black bear

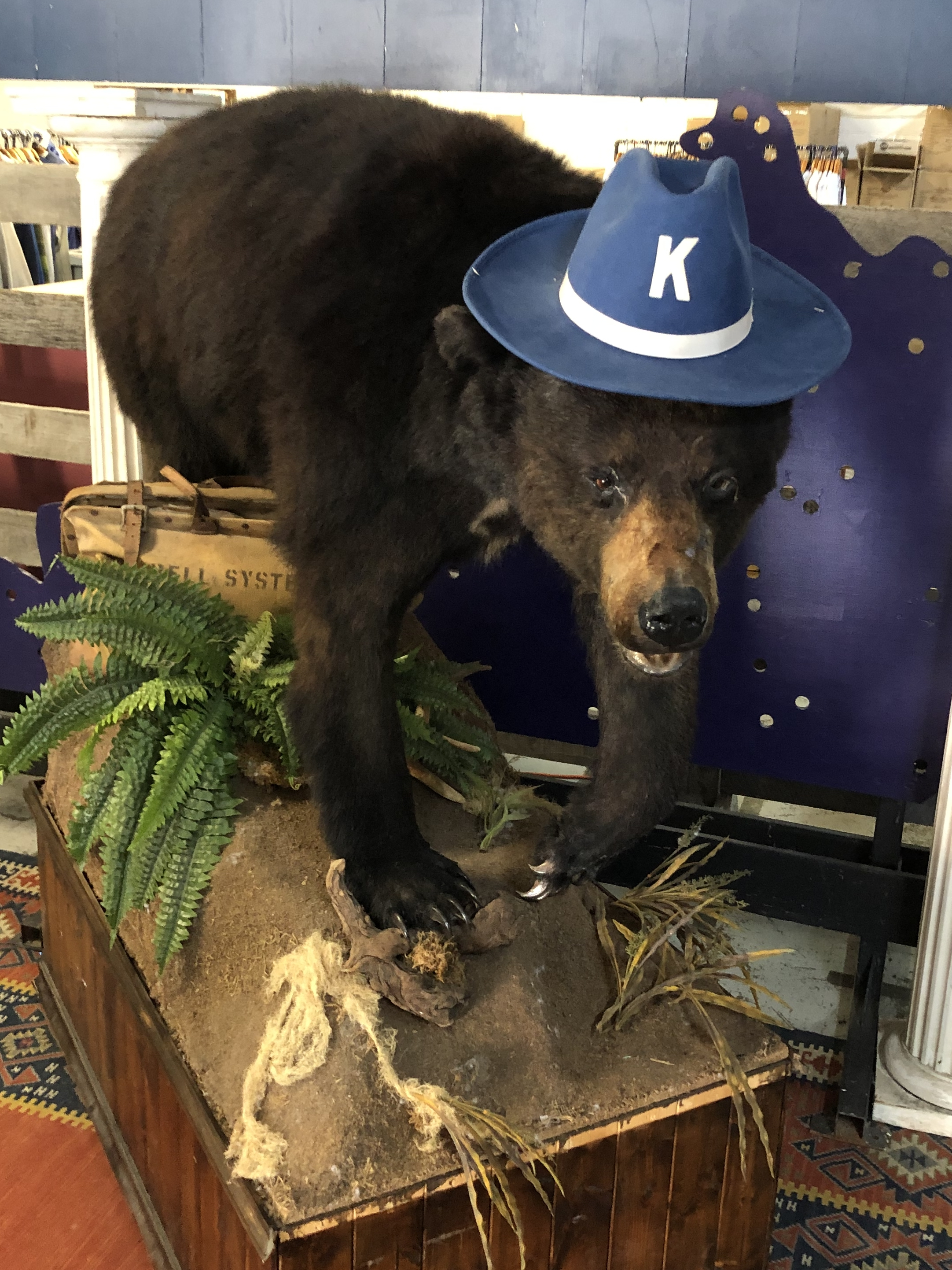
- Cocaine Bear taxidermied in Lexington, Kentucky
- Other names: Pablo Eskobear, Cokey the Bear
- Species: American black bear
- Sex: Female
- Born: c. early 1980s
- Died: late 1985
- Cause of death: Cocaine intoxication
- Resting place: Lexington, Kentucky
- Known for: Unusual cause of death
- Weight: 175 lb (79 kg)

Cocaine Bear, also known as Pablo Escobear, was a 175-pound (79 kg) female American black bear that fatally overdosed on cocaine in 1985. The cocaine had been dropped by a group of drug smugglers in the wilderness in Tennessee, United States. After the bear was found dead in northern Georgia, she was taxidermied and eventually displayed at a shopping mall in Kentucky. She inspired the 2023 comedy horror film Cocaine Bear, as well as the 2023 documentary film Cocaine Bear: The True Story.

== History ==
On September 11, 1985, former Lexington police department narcotics officer turned drug smuggler Andrew C. Thornton II was trafficking cocaine into the United States. After dropping off a shipment in Blairsville, Georgia, Thornton and an accomplice, Bill Leonard, departed in a self-piloted Cessna 404 Titan. En route, the duo dropped a load of 40 plastic containers of cocaine into the wilderness before abandoning the plane above Knoxville, Tennessee. Allegedly, Thornton was killed when his parachute failed to open. According to the FBI, Thornton dumped his cargo because the load of two men, in addition to the cocaine, was too heavy for the plane to carry.

On December 23, the Georgia Bureau of Investigation reported finding a dead black bear that had eaten a large amount of the cocaine from the jettisoned containers and suffered a drug overdose. The containers had held about 75 pounds or 34 kg of cocaine, valued at $20 million (equivalent to $60 million in 2025), and by the time the scene was studied by government authorities, all of the containers had been ripped open, with their contents scattered. The chief medical examiner from the Georgia State Crime Lab, Dr. Kenneth Alonso, stated that the bear's stomach was "literally packed to the brim with cocaine", although he estimated she had absorbed only 3 to 4 grams into her bloodstream at the time of her death.

Dr. Alonso did not want to waste the body of the bear, so he had her taxidermied and gave it to the Chattahoochee River National Recreation Area. The bear, however, disappeared until it emerged again in a pawn shop. Eventually she made her way to the "Kentucky for Kentucky Fun Mall" in Lexington, Kentucky, where she remains to this day. It has been alleged that the bear kept in Lexington is not the same bear that died in Georgia, but rather another, unrelated bear, due to the fact that the original bear was in a state of decomposition, although the mall maintains that the bear is the original. According to the bear's owners, the Cocaine Bear has the authority to officiate legally binding weddings in the mall where it is kept due to a loophole in Kentucky's marriage laws.

== Film adaptation ==
On March 9, 2021, Universal Pictures announced that a film, Cocaine Bear, would be directed by Elizabeth Banks. The film takes significant liberties—while the events which occurred between the bear's ingestion of cocaine and its death are not known, the bear is not known to have caused any deaths, as was portrayed by the film. The film was released on February 24, 2023. Coinciding with the release of the film, Peacock created a documentary film titled Cocaine Bear: The True Story about the bear.

== See also ==
- List of individual bears
