= Andrew C. Thornton II =

American narcotics officer, lawyer and drug smuggler (1944–1985)

- Born: Andrew Carter Thornton II; October 30, 1944; Bourbon County, Kentucky
- Died: September 11, 1985 (aged 40); Knoxville, Tennessee
- Cause of death: Parachute malfunction
- Education: University of Kentucky College of Law
- Occupations: Lawyer, police officer, drug smuggler

Andrew Carter Thornton II (October 30, 1944 – September 11, 1985) was an American narcotics officer and lawyer who became the head member of "The Company", a drug smuggling ring in Kentucky.

== Early life, education and military ==
Andrew Carter Thornton II was born on October 30, 1944, in Bourbon County, Kentucky. The son of Carter and Peggy Thornton of Threave Main Stud farm, he grew up in the Lexington, Kentucky, area and attended the private Sayre School and the Iroquois Polo Club. He later transferred to Sewanee Military Academy, graduating in 1962. He then joined the ROTC and attended the University of Kentucky for a semester before dropping out to join the Army. Thornton trained at Fort Bragg as a paratrooper for the 82nd Airborne Division. He participated in the 1965 U.S. invasion of the Dominican Republic and received a Purple Heart for his service. He returned to school for a year in 1966 but dropped out and trained racehorses for his father.

== Career ==
After quitting the army, Thornton joined the Lexington–Fayette Urban County Police Department in 1968. He took night classes at Eastern Kentucky University and graduated with a degree in law enforcement in 1971. He became a member of the Lexington Police Department's narcotics squad in the early 1970s and worked on narcotics investigations with the Louisville office of the Drug Enforcement Administration. During his time with the police, Thornton was a part-time student at the University of Kentucky College of Law, earning a Juris Doctor in 1976.

During his tenure, he began smuggling.

After resigning from the police in 1977, Thornton practiced law in Lexington.

Four years later, he was among 25 men accused in Fresno, California, in a theft of weapons from the China Lake Naval Weapons Center and of conspiring to smuggle 1,000 pounds of marijuana into the United States. Thornton left California after pleading not guilty and was arrested as a fugitive in North Carolina, wearing a bulletproof vest and carrying a pistol. He pled no contest in Fresno to a misdemeanor drug charge and the felony charges were dropped. He was sentenced to six months in prison, fined $500, placed on probation for five years, and had his law license suspended.

== Death ==
On September 11, 1985, while on a smuggling run from Colombia, Thornton and a partner jumped from his auto-piloted Cessna 404, after dumping packages of cocaine off near Blairsville, Georgia, US. Thornton became caught in his parachute and ended up in a free fall to the ground. His body was found by 85-year-old Fred Myers, in the gravel driveway of Myers' home in Knoxville, Tennessee. The plane crashed over 60 miles (97 km) away in Hayesville, North Carolina. At the time of his death Thornton was wearing a bulletproof vest and expensive Italian shoes, and in possession of night vision goggles, a green army duffel bag containing approximately 35 kg (77 lb) of cocaine valued at $15 million, $4,500 in cash, six 1 oz (about 28 g) gold Krugerrands, knives, and two pistols.

Three months later, a dead black bear, later known as the Cocaine Bear, that had apparently overdosed on cocaine dropped by Thornton, was found in the Chattahoochee National Forest.

== Legacy ==
The story of Thornton was examined in Dominick Dunne's Power, Privilege, and Justice and in Sally Denton's The Bluegrass Conspiracy. Thornton was also detailed in a Discovery Channel double-length episode of The FBI Files named "Dangerous Company" in 2003.

His death also served as the inspiration for the story arc of season four of FX Network's Justified. The beginning of episode one features a flashback to 1983 in which a man falls to his death, parachute still attached, with bricks of cocaine scattered around his body. The bag that had carried the cocaine becomes the focus of a mystery roughly 30 years later.

The story also inspired the film Cocaine Bear, released in February 2023. Thornton is played by Welsh actor Matthew Rhys.
