= Vogue House =

Coordinates: 51.5133°N 0.1432°W

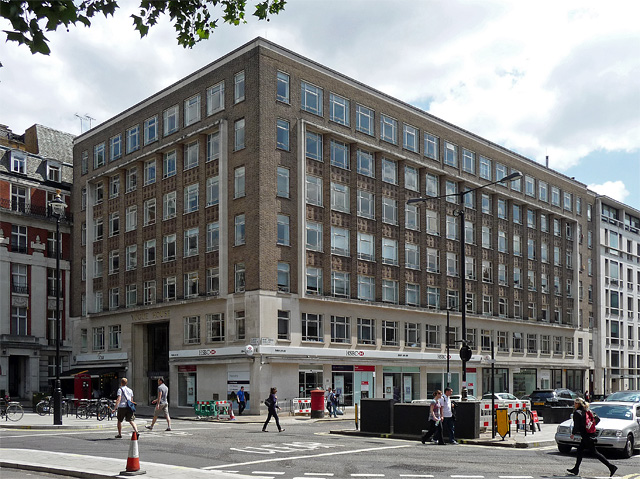
- Interactive map of the Vogue House area

General information
- Type: Office
- Location: London, United Kingdom
- Completed: 1958; 68 years ago
- Owner: Global Holdings Group; (2024–present)

Design and construction
- Architects: Yates, Cook & Darbyshire

Vogue House is a London office building that was designed by Yates, Cook & Darbyshire and completed in 1958. After being located at the site for over sixty years, the publishing company Condé Nast and its publications moved out of the building in 2023.

In January 2024, Global Holdings Group announced that it had completed the purchase of the building for approximately £70 million.
