= List of unusual deaths in the 21st century =

Lists of unusual deaths
Antiquity	Middle Ages	Renaissance	Early modern period
19th century	20th century	21st century	Animal deaths

This list of unusual deaths includes unique or extremely rare circumstances of death recorded throughout the 21st century, noted as being unusual by multiple sources.

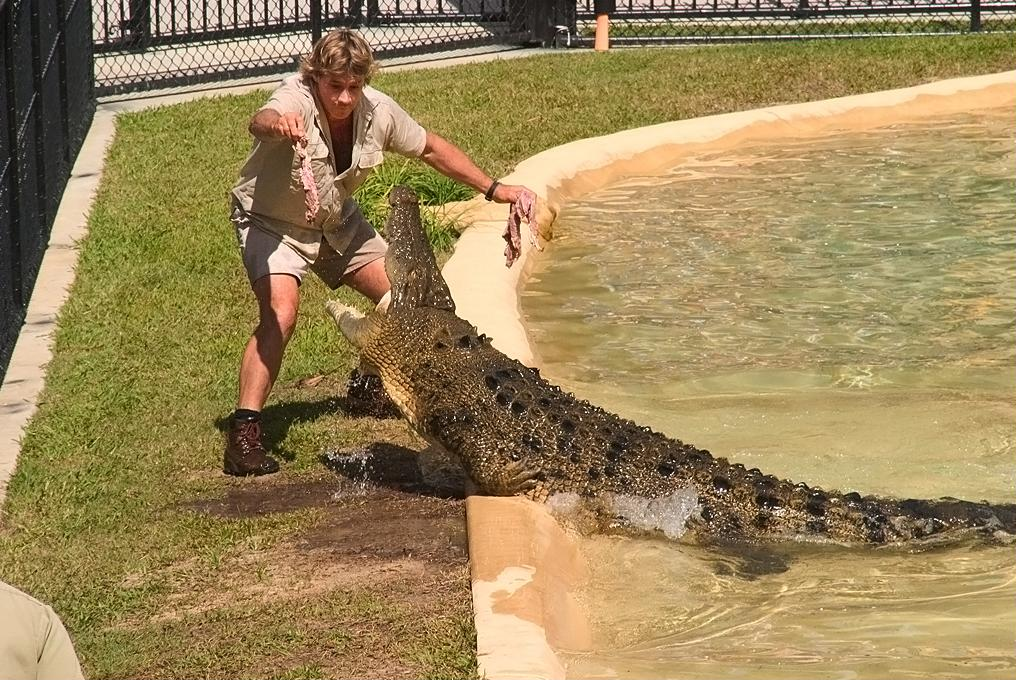
Steve Irwin, the "Crocodile Hunter" who was killed by a stingray

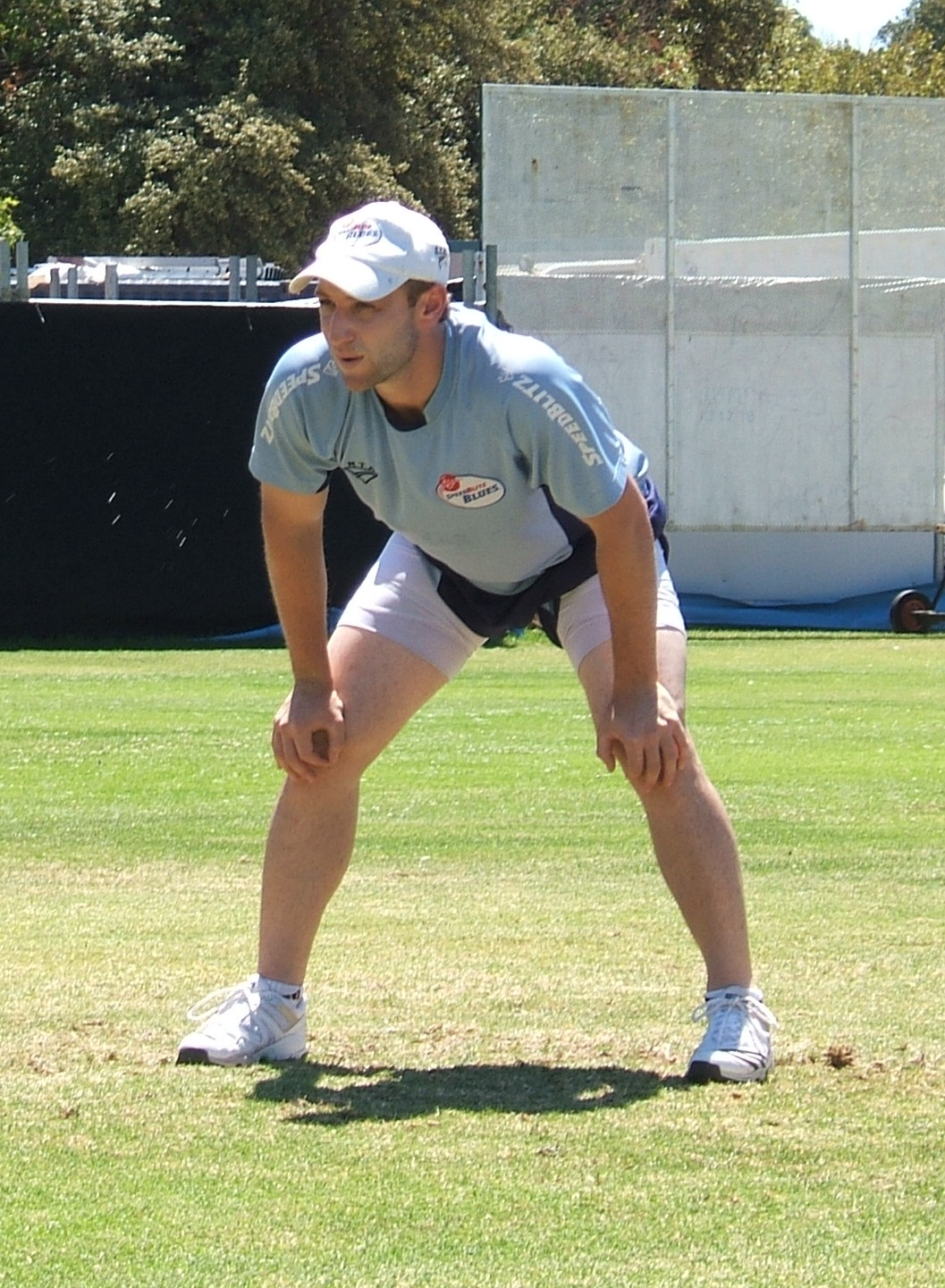
Phillip Hughes, Australian cricketer killed on the pitch

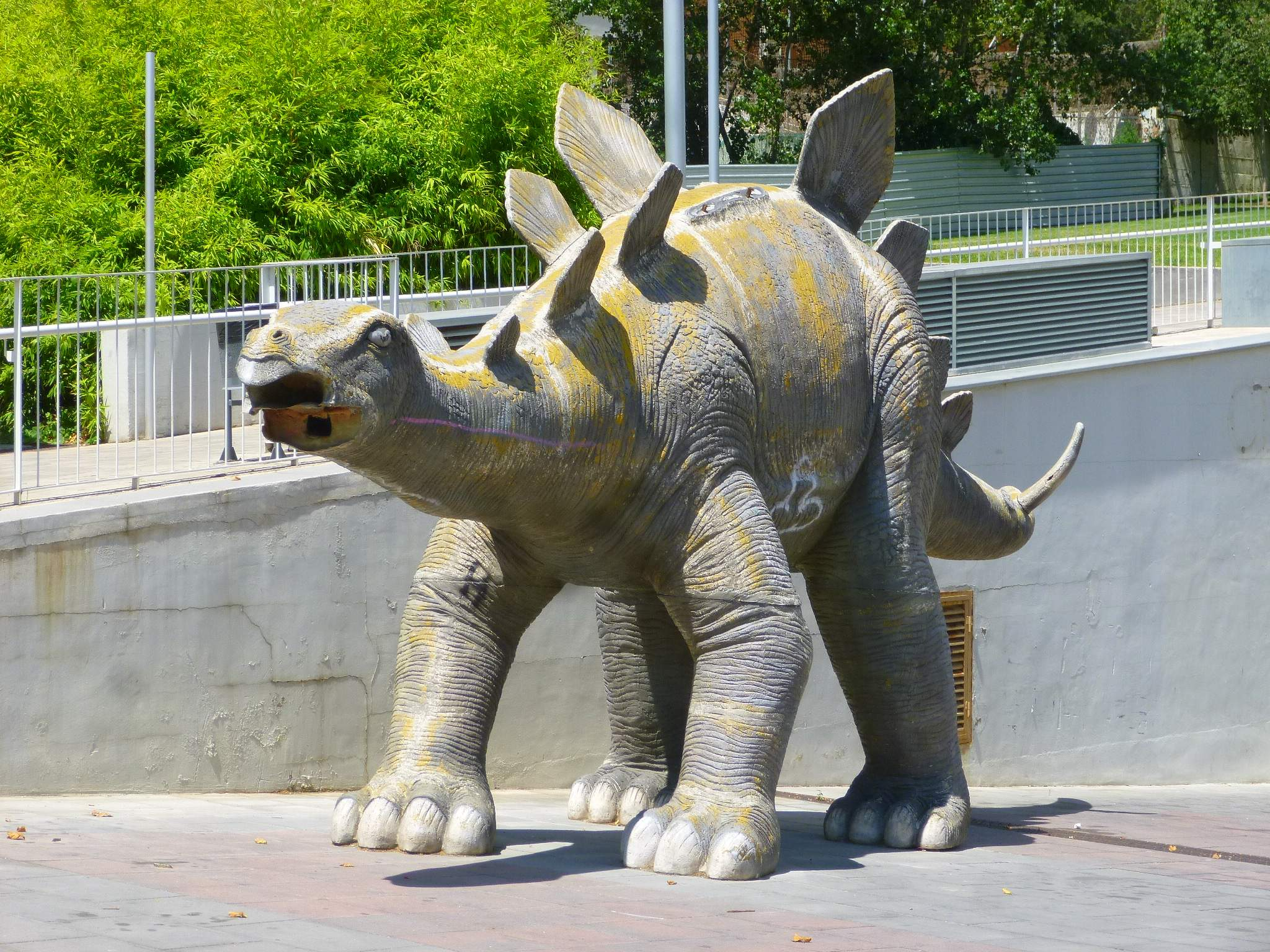
The Stegosaurus statue inside which a man died

== 2000s ==
Name of person	Image	Date of death	Country	Details
Bernd Brandes		9 March 2001	Germany	The 43-year-old engineer was voluntarily slaughtered and eaten by Armin Meiwes following an appointment via the Internet at Meiwes' home in Rotenburg. At Brandes' request, Meiwes first severed Brandes' penis, and they unsuccessfully tried to eat it. Meiwes taped the entire amputation, killing, conserving, and eating Brandes' meat. Meiwes was eventually arrested, tried, and sentenced to life in prison.
Unknown man		27 April 2001	Canada	A man in his mid-50s was visiting his mother's house in Vernon, British Columbia, to attend his father's funeral. While cleaning the kitchen, he tripped over the open dishwasher door and was fatally impaled on knives sticking up out of the cutlery tray.
Michael Colombini		29 July 2001	United States	The 6-year-old died during an MRI scan at Westchester Medical Center in Valhalla, New York, after an oxygen tank was magnetically pulled into the machine and fractured his skull.
Brittanie Cecil		18 March 2002	United States	The 13-year-old died from her injuries at a National Hockey League (NHL) game in Columbus, Ohio, after a deflected puck struck her in the left temple. This was the first, and to date only, fan fatality in the league's history.
Roger Wallace		18 May 2002	United States	The 60-year-old auto parts salesman was flying his 5-foot (1.5 m) wingspan remote-control plane in Tucson, Arizona, when he lost sight of it in the bright sun. It struck him in the chest, killing him.
Miroslav Kukliš		10 September 2002	Croatia	The 31-year-old Czech tourist killed himself by stabbing his chest with a knife during a cave diving trip in the Poganica bay near Split. Due to the nature of his death, police initially believed that he was murdered. Later investigation concluded that after Kukliš became lost in the underwater cave and ran out of oxygen, he stabbed himself to avoid the prolonged pain of death by drowning.
Louis Dethy		6 October 2002	Belgium	The 79-year-old retired engineer from Pont-de-Loup installed 20 booby traps in his house with the reported intention of killing his family, who he had become estranged from after being caught cheating on his wife, but was killed by a shotgun pellet from one of the traps after accidentally activating it. He was presumed to have died by suicide until police inadvertently activated another trap.
Jane McDonald		27 May 2003	Scotland	While visiting a friend in Airdrie, North Lanarkshire, the 31-year-old slipped and fell onto an open dishwasher, landing on an upright knife. She was taken to a hospital, where she died of her injuries.
Rebecca Longhoffer		16 August 2003	United States	The 39-year-old tourist and mother of four was electrocuted while crossing Las Vegas Boulevard when she stepped on a cast-iron plate hidden by a deep rain puddle that covered electrical wiring.
Hitoshi Nikaidoh		16 August 2003	United States	The 35-year-old surgical resident from Houston, Texas, was killed after his head was trapped in elevator doors at the hospital where he worked. He was partially decapitated as the elevator ascended, and he also sustained injuries to his ribs and spine.
Brian Wells		28 August 2003	United States	The 46-year-old pizza deliveryman from Erie, Pennsylvania, was killed after a collar bomb around his neck exploded as part of a bank robbery scheme.
Unknown woman		2004	Taiwan	A 45-year-old woman bathed in 40.5% ethanol in an attempt to protect herself from SARS during the 2002–2004 SARS outbreak. She lay down in the fluid at 11 p.m. and was found dead at 11 a.m. by her family the next day. Her BAC was 1.35% and she most likely absorbed the alcohol through her skin.
Francis Daniel Brohm		29 August 2004	United States	The 23-year-old was hanging out the passenger window of 21-year-old John Hutcherson's car when an intoxicated Hutcherson drove off the road in Cobb County, Georgia, and sideswiped a telephone pole support wire, decapitating him. Hutcherson continued the final 12 miles (19 km) to his Atlanta home, parked in the driveway, and went to bed. A neighbor found Brohm's headless body in the truck the next morning.
Kenneth Pinyan		2 July 2005	United States	The 45-year-old Boeing engineer from Seattle, nicknamed Mr. Hands, died from acute peritonitis after his colon was perforated while being anally penetrated by a horse.
Chandler Hugh Jackson		6 July 2005	United States	The 12-year-old was playing at the Dogwood Hill golf club in Cunningham, Kentucky, when he fell on his 9-iron club while retrieving an out-of-bounds ball. The club broke, with a piece of the shaft piercing his aorta through his chest.
Steve Irwin		4 September 2006	Australia	The 44-year-old wildlife expert and television personality was pierced in the chest by a short-tail stingray's barb while filming in shallow water in the Great Barrier Reef, off the coast of Australia.
Alexander Litvinenko		23 November 2006	England	The 44-year-old naturalised British citizen, former Russian FSB officer, and defector, was assassinated by poisoning with polonium-210, which caused acute and irreversible radiation sickness. One of just a handful of recorded deaths attributed specifically to polonium exposure, Litvinenko is the only confirmed fatality from malicious polonium poisoning.
Jennifer Lea Strange		12 January 2007	United States	The 28-year-old mother was participating in a contest sponsored by Sacramento-based radio station KDND, called "Hold Your Wee For A Wii", in which contestants had to drink excessive amounts of water without going to the bathroom. She vomited during the contest and returned home with a headache, later dying of water intoxication.
Humberto Hernandez		21 June 2007	United States	The 24-year-old resident of Oakland, California, was struck in the back of the head by an airborne fire hydrant when a passing car struck it, and the water pressure shot it at him with great force.
Francis Pete Tovey		18 March 2008	Australia	The 81-year-old built a device consisting of a jigsaw power tool attached to a .22 semi-automatic handgun containing four bullets after downloading suicide plans on the Internet. He activated it, which fired multiple shots at his head, killing him. Tovey, who originated from England and was living in Burleigh Heads at the time, left a note stating that he was struggling after pressure from relatives to move from his £450,000 home to a retirement home.
Judy Kay Zagorski		20 March 2008	United States	The 57-year-old from Pigeon, Michigan, died of blunt force craniocerebral trauma when a 75-pound (34 kg) spotted eagle ray leaped out of the water and knocked her over off the coast of Marathon Key, Florida. The ray also died.
Adelir Antônio de Carli		21 April 2008	Brazil	The 41-year-old priest and sky diver undertook a cluster balloon flight to raise funds for charity. During the flight, contact was lost and de Carli disappeared. The lower part of his body was found floating in the sea eleven weeks later on 4 July.
Isaiah Otieno		13 May 2008	Canada	The student from Cranbrook, British Columbia, was struck and killed by a helicopter that plunged into a residential street he was walking in. The pilot and two other passengers of the helicopter were also instantly killed.
David Phyall		5 July 2008	England	The 50-year-old last resident in a block of flats due to be demolished in Bishopstoke decapitated himself with a chainsaw to highlight the injustice of being forced to move out of it.
Unknown woman		7 October 2008	Ireland	A 43-year-old woman from Limerick died of an allergic reaction after having sex with a German Shepherd. She met the dog's owner, Seán McDonnell, in an Internet chat room for bestiality. McDonnell was prosecuted and added to a sex offender list. The dog was later euthanized.
Fernando Gomez		2 November 2008	England	The 35-year-old Spanish drum maker died of multiple organ failure following an anthrax infection, which was traced to the inhalation of spores from imported hide at his home in Hackney, London.
Jeff Twaddle		27 March 2009	United States	The 54-year-old charter boat deckhand from Huntington Beach, California, choked to death on a bait fish he had placed in his mouth to amuse a group of elementary school students on a fishing trip off Long Beach.
Diana Durre		3 April 2009	United States	The 49-year-old was killed in North Platte, Nebraska, when a Taco Bell sign was knocked over by high winds and landed on a pickup truck, crushing her and injuring her husband Mark.
Mark Fidrych		13 April 2009	United States	The 54-year-old former Major League Baseball pitcher of the Detroit Tigers suffocated to death when his clothes became entangled with the power take-off drive shaft of his dump truck while working underneath it.
David Carradine		3 June 2009	Thailand	The 72-year-old American actor was found dead in a closet at the Nai Lert Park Hotel in Bangkok with his neck and genitals bound and connected by a cord. His death was ruled a case of autoerotic asphyxiation rather than suicide.
Taylor Mitchell		28 October 2009	Canada	The 19-year-old folk singer was killed by a pair of coyotes while hiking in Cape Breton Highlands National Park, in the only known fatal coyote attack on an adult.
Larry Ely Murillo-Moncada		28 November 2009	United States	The 25-year-old Honduran man became trapped after falling behind a 12-foot tall (3.7 m) supermarket freezer in Council Bluffs, Iowa after suffering from hallucinations. His body was discovered by contractors removing freezer units almost 10 years later, on 24 January 2019.

== 2010s ==
Name of person	Image	Date of death	Country	Details
Muraka Jenny Vearncombe		3 March 2010	Australia	The 42-year-old was struck in the head by a piece of a metal pipe flung by a tractor-pulled lawnmower as she walked to work in Townsville.
Paulette Gebara Farah		22 March 2010	Mexico	The disabled four-year-old choked to death in her Huixquilucan apartment after falling in the gap between her mattress and bedrail. It took nine days for her body to be discovered. Despite widespread suspicion surrounding her parents' involvement, police officially ruled it an accident.
Gareth Williams		16 August 2010	England	The 31-year-old Welsh mathematician and GCHQ analyst was found dead and naked in a bag that had been padlocked from the outside, in the bath of his home in Central London. The inquest found his death was likely criminal, although a Metropolitan Police investigation later found that it was likely an accident.
Filair Let L-410 passengers and crew		25 August 2010	DR Congo	Three crew and 17 passengers of a Let L-410 Turbolet were killed in a crash as it approached Bandundu Airport, reportedly resulting from an escaped crocodile. According to the sole survivor of the crash, the animal was smuggled aboard by a passenger but escaped mid-flight. Panicked passengers surged forward, unbalancing the plane and causing a loss of control. An Air Accidents Investigation Branch investigator stated that the claim was "extremely unlikely" but that they "wouldn't rule it out completely".
Mike Edwards		3 September 2010	England	The 62-year-old cellist and founding member of the band Electric Light Orchestra died when a large, round bale of hay rolled down a hill and collided with a van he was driving in Totnes.
Jimi Heselden		26 September 2010	England	The 62-year-old owner of Segway Inc. died after apparently riding a Segway Personal Transport System off a cliff in Thorp Arch. The coroner concluded Heselden likely fell from the cliff with the Segway after "getting into difficulty" reversing to allow a man walking his dog to pass him.
Jose Luis Ochoa		30 January 2011	United States	The 35-year-old died after being stabbed in the leg at an illegal cockfight in Tulare County, California, by a bird with a knife-like spur strapped to its leg.
Xavier Tondo		23 May 2011	Spain	The 32-year-old Spanish road racing cyclist was crushed to death between a garage door and his car as he prepared to leave his home in Monachil for a training ride prior to the 2011 Tour de France.
Unknown man and woman		6 June 2011	Canada	Two unnamed people were killed in an accident on a rural Quebec road when a "flying bear" collided with their SUV. The 200-kilogram (440 lb) black bear had stepped into the path of traffic on Highway 148 and was sent airborne by a car in front of the SUV. The bear passed through the windshield, struck the 25-year-old driver and the 40-year-old passenger seated behind her, and passed through the rear window. The driver's boyfriend was in the front passenger seat and received injuries to his upper body which were described as "not life-threatening". The bear also died.
Sam Mazzola		July 2011	United States	The 49-year-old exotic pet keeper was found dead after being tied up and left in a face-down position while chained to a waterbed at his home in Columbia Station, Ohio. He had asphyxiated after placing a sex toy in his throat, with his face having been covered by a leather mask that sealed his mouth and nostrils. It was determined that the death was the result of a consensual sex act conducted with a second person, who had left the premises after restraining the man before his death. Homicide and suicide were ruled out and the death was deemed accidental. Mazzola had previously gained attention after one of his pet bears fatally mauled a 24-year-old employee in August 2010, which led to a monetary fine and the euthanasia of the bear.
Unknown woman		20 August 2011	Australia	The 29-year-old was killed by an airborne towball in Geraldton. The woman's partner had used the front hitch of their car to drag another car out of sand when the metal snapped, launching the broken towball of the other car through the window into the woman's throat as she was sitting in the front passenger seat.
Alexander McCrae		17 November 2011	Scotland	The 23-year-old slaughterhouse worker and professional mixed martial arts fighter was walking towards a sink at his workplace in Paisley, Renfrewshire when a 320-kilogram (700 lb) cow carcass fell off a suspended conveyor belt and fatally crushed him.
Erica Marshall		10 February 2012	United States	The 28-year-old British veterinarian in Ocala, Florida, died when the horse she was treating in a hyperbaric oxygen chamber kicked the wall, releasing a spark from its horseshoe, causing a fire and explosion. The horse was also killed and another worker was seriously injured.
Anthony Hensley		14 April 2012	United States	The 37-year-old was kayaking across a pond at a residential complex in Des Plaines, Illinois, when he got too close to a swan's nest. The swan attacked him, threw him out of the kayak, and prevented him from surfacing; he ultimately drowned.
Elizabeth Watkins		6 May 2012	Australia	The 24-year-old field hockey player died in Perth after a deflected ball struck her on the head.
Dieter Strack		27 August 2012	Germany	The 74-year-old official was on the field at a youth athletic competition in Düsseldorf to measure a javelin throw when the javelin speared him in the throat. He died in the hospital the following day.
Kendrick Johnson		10 January 2013	United States	The 17-year-old was discovered trapped head down in a rolled-up gym mat in his high school gymnasium in Valdosta, Georgia. Police concluded he climbed into it to retrieve a shoe and became trapped, leading to his death from positional asphyxia. His family later brought a civil lawsuit stating that his death was a murder; that lawsuit was subsequently withdrawn.
James Campbell		14 January 2013	United States	The 68-year-old man from Cantonment, Florida, had left his 1995 Chevrolet Van to open a gate from his driveway when his dog stepped on the van's gas pedal and ran him over.
Jacob Marx		28 January 2013	England	The 27-year-old New Zealand lawyer was walking in Camden Town, London, when he was crushed by a 200-kilogram (440 lb) metal sign dislodged by strong winds. He died of a heart attack at a hospital.
Elisa Lam		February 2013	United States	The 21-year-old Canadian tourist was missing for several weeks before being found dead in a large water tank on the roof of the Cecil Hotel in Los Angeles, after guests complained about low pressure and foul smell of the water.
Emily Titterington		8 February 2013	England	The 16-year-old girl died at her home in St Austell, Cornwall, after refusing to defecate for eight weeks. She had autism, a history of bowel health issues, and a lifelong fear of toilets. The cause of death was cardiac arrest due to abdominal distension, caused by severe constipation, which led to the compression of several organs.
Unknown man		11 April 2013	Belarus	A 60-year-old fisherman bled to death in Brest region after being bitten by a Eurasian beaver which he had tried to grab to have his picture taken with it.
João Maria de Souza		12 July 2013	Brazil	The 45-year-old was sleeping in bed with his wife at his home in Caratinga, Minas Gerais, when a cow climbed on top of the house's roof from a steep hillside behind it, fell through the roof, and crushed him. He subsequently succumbed to internal bleeding whilst waiting to be treated at a nearby hospital. Both his wife and the cow were unharmed.
Noah and Connor Barthe		5 August 2013	Canada	The brothers, aged 4 and 6, respectively, were killed by an African rock python during a sleepover at their friend's apartment in Campbellton, New Brunswick. The snake had escaped from its inadequate enclosure, moved through ducts it could easily access, and fallen through the ceiling where the boys slept 3 metres (9.8 ft) away. Though the snake suffocated them, it did not attempt to eat them. However, an African rock python would not constrict unless it planned on eating; therefore, the python's owners likely failed to feed it. The python was euthanized.
Roman Pirozek Jr.		5 September 2013	United States	The 19-year-old model airplane enthusiast was decapitated by the blade of his radio-controlled helicopter while performing aerobatic maneuvers in Calvert Vaux Park in Brooklyn, New York.
Denver Lee St. Clair		21 December 2013	United States	The 58-year-old was asphyxiated by an "atomic wedgie" during an altercation with his stepson, Brad Davis, in McLoud, Oklahoma. After he had been knocked unconscious, the elastic band from his torn underwear was pulled over his head and stretched around his neck, strangling him. Davis was sentenced to 30 years in prison.
J.R.N.		18 January 2014	Brazil	A 52-year-old man, identified only as J.R.N., attempted to commit bestiality with a sow in Tapurah, but was attacked by the animals and wounded in the genitals. He died from cardiac arrest. His arms and face were also mutilated by the animals. Initially, police believed that the man had been murdered and disposed of at the farm, but this was disproven as numerous pieces of evidence showed that the man had drunk alcohol, used a condom, and had been wearing only underwear. The man had worked at the farm for two years.
Naima Rharouity		30 January 2014	Canada	The 47-year-old Morrocan woman living in Montreal got strangled to death after her headscarf and hair got stuck in the escalator mechanism as she was stepping off. The lodged scarf pinned her neck against the escalator grooves and caused asphyxiation whilst her hair was ripped off the scalp by moving plates.
Grant Adams		9 June 2014	England	The 17-year-old had just woken up when he tripped on a wire and fell into a free-standing tanning bed in his bedroom on the morning of 8 June 2014, breaking one of the bed's glass tubes and piercing his neck in two places. He was airlifted from his house in South Shields to the Royal Victoria Infirmary in Newcastle upon Tyne, where he died the next day.
Vera Williams		October 2014	Wales	The 75-year-old from Rhyl died a couple of weeks after swallowing a sharp piece of toast that tore her esophagus. Her ultimate cause of death was ruled to be from gastrointestinal bleeding.
Heval Yıldırım		3 October 2014	Turkey	The 13-year-old was killed when a sacrificial goat bought for Eid al-Adha jumped off the roof of his apartment building in Diyarbakır over a protective fence and fell onto him. His father had placed it on the roof where he lived because he could not find another suitable place to keep it.
Peter Biaksangzuala		19 October 2014	India	The 23-year-old football player from Mizoram state died after sustaining spinal cord injuries while awkwardly landing a somersault, celebrating a goal.
Christophe de Margerie		20 October 2014	Russia	The 63-year-old French CEO of Total S.A. was killed when his corporate jet collided during take-off with an airport snowplow reportedly driven by a drunk driver in Moscow.
Gary Anderson		3 November 2014	United States	The 58-year-old from Somerdale, New Jersey, was delivering drywall to a construction site when a worker accidentally dropped a 1-pound (0.45 kg) tape measure which plummeted 50 stories, or approximately 500 feet (150 m), ricocheted off a piece of metal 10 feet (3 m) from the ground, and smashed into Anderson's head. He was rushed to Jersey City Medical Center where he suffered cardiac arrest and was pronounced dead at 9:52 a.m. Hard hats were mandatory at the site, and it is unclear why Anderson was not wearing one when he was killed.
Phillip Hughes		27 November 2014	Australia	The 25-year-old Australian Test and ODI cricketer was killed by a bouncer striking his neck during a cricket match, causing a vertebral artery dissection.
Joshua Harrison-Jones		7 January 2015	England	The 16-year-old from Stretford, Greater Manchester, died when his neck became trapped between his exercise bench and a onesie he was using as a resistance band.
Charmayne "Maxee" Maxwell		28 February 2015	United States	The 46-year-old member of American R&B group Brownstone died after falling backward while holding a wine glass. During the fall, the glass shattered on the ground behind her head, and the shards pierced her neck, causing profuse bleeding.
Stephen Woytack		30 March 2015	United States	The 74-year-old was decorating his family's grave plot at St. Joseph's Cemetery in Throop, Pennsylvania, for Easter with his wife when the tombstone of his mother-in-law toppled over, pinning him underneath and crushing him to death. The stone had reportedly been dislodged when the previously frozen ground was thawed by the early spring temperatures. Woytack was buried in a plot directly in front of the tombstone that killed him.
Randy Llanes		29 May 2015	United States	The 47-year-old fisherman from Kailua-Kona, Hawaii, was impaled in the chest by a swordfish he had harpooned when he jumped into the water to retrieve it.
Unknown man		8 June 2015	Russia	The 41-year-old unemployed man died after eating pieces of a broken tablet computer whilst resisting arrest by officers in St Petersburg, Russia. Police had responded to disturbance calls in which the man had allegedly thrown items and furniture out of his apartment window.
Unknown man		23 August 2015	Germany	The 79-year-old pensioner from Heidenheim died of cucurbitacin poisoning after eating home-grown zucchini. His wife was also hospitalised, but recovered.
Suharto Dimjati		24 September 2015	Malaysia	The 48-year-old man was inspecting recently slaughtered cows as part of animal sacrifice in Yong Peng, Johor. As he leaned down on one of the animals, the still-living cow began thrashing. Another worker attempted to restrain the cow, but lost grip on a parang he was holding. The knife was sent airborne and cut the elder worker in the left forearm, causing him to bleed to death at a hospital.
Chelsea Ake-Salvacion		19 October 2015	United States	The 24-year-old beauty salon employee in Henderson, Nevada, was suffocated while using a cryotherapy machine set to the wrong level, which eliminated the oxygen in the chamber.
Tom Wilson		9 December 2015	England	The 22-year-old British field hockey player died after being struck in the head with a stick during a practice match in Loughton, Essex, and suffering a cerebral haemorrhage.
Ravi Subramanian		16 December 2015	India	The 54-year-old Air India technician was sucked into the jet engine of a plane grounded at Mumbai Airport when its co-pilot started it prematurely.
V. Kamaraj		2016	India	The 40-year-old Indian bus driver was claimed in local newspapers to have been killed by a meteorite which left a two-foot (60 cm) crater, although officials from NASA disagree, saying that the most likely explanation was a land-based explosion. According to a preliminary report by the National College Instrumentation Facility (NCIF) in Tiruchirappalli, a scanning electron microscope (SEM) study on the evidence of the samples retrieved from the campus in Vellore, from where the blast occurred, showed the "presence of carbonaceous chondrites".
Pamela Page		22 March 2016	United States	The 28-year-old died at a Biggby Coffee drive-thru in Summerville, South Carolina. As she was picking up a dropped item on the road through her opened car door, her foot slipped off the brake, causing the vehicle to move forwards. The car door collided with a pillar, pinning the driver between the door and the coffee shop.
Irma Bule		4 April 2016	Indonesia	The 29-year-old Indonesian dangdut singer who performed with live snakes died during a concert after being bitten by a king cobra and refusing treatment.
Joshua Brown		7 May 2016	United States	The 40-year-old crashed at full speed into the back of a semi-trailer truck in Williston, Florida, while his Tesla Model S was on Autopilot. The car's front camera failed to recognize the truck in harsh sunlight. According to the National Transportation Safety Board report, "there was no driver interaction with Autopilot, no change in steering angle, and no brake lamp switch activation until the collision." He became the first U.S. fatality in a wreck involving an autonomous vehicle.
Lottie Michelle Belk		6 June 2016	United States	The 55-year-old was fatally stabbed in the chest by a beach umbrella blown by a strong wind in Virginia Beach, Virginia. Wind speeds at the time reached 20–25 miles per hour (32–40 km/h).
Lane Graves		14 June 2016	United States	The 2-year-old boy from Nebraska was on vacation and playing on the beach at Seven Seas Lagoon around 9 p.m. at Disney's Grand Floridian Resort & Spa, just outside of Orlando, Florida, when an alligator approached him and dragged him under the water. Graves' body was found nearby the next day, intact and apparently drowned.
Anton Yelchin		19 June 2016	United States	The 27-year-old American actor, known for portraying Pavel Chekov in the Star Trek reboot movie series, was found pinned between his Jeep Grand Cherokee and a brick wall. His driveway was on an incline and his car was found running and in neutral. The manufacturer had recalled the car make in April 2016 for concerns about its gearshift design that could cause rollaway incidents, but the software patch to repair the vehicles did not reach dealers until the week of Yelchin's death.
John William Ashe		22 June 2016	United States	The 61-year-old Antiguan diplomat and politician, a former President of the United Nations General Assembly who was awaiting trial on bribery charges, died when a barbell fell on his neck at his home in Dobbs Ferry, New York, causing traumatic asphyxia and laryngeal fractures.
Kristopher Moules and Timothy Gilliam Jr.		18 July 2016	United States	Moules, a 25-year-old correctional officer, and Gilliam, a 27-year-old out-of-county inmate being housed at the Luzerne County Correctional Facility in Luzerne County, Pennsylvania, fell to their deaths after an altercation between them caused them to slam into the exterior of the fifth-floor elevator doors. Despite the elevator having a valid license, the door popped open on impact, causing the men to fall five flights down the shaft to their deaths.
Unknown girl		26 July 2016	Morocco	A 7-year-old girl died after being struck by a stone thrown by an elephant from its enclosure at a zoo in Rabat.
Caleb Schwab		7 August 2016	United States	The 10-year-old was decapitated when he was ejected from his raft on Verrückt, a 168-foot-tall (51 m) water slide at Schlitterbahn Kansas City water park in Kansas.
Julio Macías González		26 August 2016	Mexico	The 17-year-old from Mexico City died from a cerebrovascular accident caused by embolus formed on a neck hickey.
Ten people		21 November 2016	Australia	A powerful southerly change in Melbourne resulted in 10 people dying from thunderstorm asthma, a phenomenon where grains of pollen rupture into particles small enough to enter the lungs (pollen grains are usually too large to do this).
Kyle Thomson		26 December 2016	United States	The 22-year-old Iowa State University student was bench-pressing about 315 pounds (143 kg) at a gym in Ankeny, Iowa, when the barbell slipped from his hands, crushing his neck. Thomson had spotters for the lift.
Unknown man		January 2017	Japan	The 50-year-old, described as a hoarder, was found dead in his two-room apartment in Kanagawa Prefecture in February 2017. He is estimated to have died over a month earlier from a heart attack, but his death went unnoticed as he had died on top of a six-ton collection of pornographic magazines also found in the home, which absorbed the liquid and smell resulting from decomposition. Early international reports erroneously claimed the man had been fatally crushed under the magazine stacks.
Akbar Salubiro		March 2017	Indonesia	The 25-year-old was killed and swallowed by a reticulated python in West Sulawesi, in the first fully confirmed case of a snake swallowing an adult human.
Charlie Holt		14 April 2017	United States	The 5-year-old was killed at the Sun Dial, a rotating restaurant at the top of Westin Peachtree Plaza Hotel in Atlanta, Georgia, when his head was caught in a small space between the rotating and non-rotating sections.
Robert Dreyer		10 May 2017	United States	The Melbourne, Florida resident drowned on his 89th birthday in Viera after he crashed his 2016 Mercedes-Benz C300 into a fire hydrant and was then swallowed by the sinkhole created by the broken water line which had fed the hydrant.
Theunis Botha		19 May 2017	Zimbabwe	The 51-year-old South African hunter was leading a hunt in Hwange National Park. When he opened fire on three elephants who were charging his hunting party, a fourth elephant picked him up with her trunk. Another hunter fatally shot the elephant, which fell on Botha, crushing him to death.
Debra Bedard		2 June 2017	United States	The 58-year-old died after falling from a golf cart onto shards of wine glasses that had broken in her hands in Calaveras County, California.
Rebecca Burger		18 June 2017	France	The 33-year-old fitness blogger and model died after a whipped-cream charger exploded and struck her in the chest in her home in Mulhouse, causing her to go into cardiac arrest as a result of commotio cordis.
Karanbir Cheema		9 July 2017	England	The 13-year-old from London died in the hospital days after having a severe allergic reaction to a piece of cheese thrown at him by a classmate. Cheema was severely allergic to wheat, gluten, all dairy products, eggs, and all nuts.
Elizabeth Isherwood		September 2017	Wales	The 60-year-old from Wolverhampton, England, walked naked into an airing cupboard at the villa at Pennal she was renting, apparently due to her getting lost during a nighttime trip to the bathroom. When she tried to leave, part of the door handle broke off in her hand. She dug into the wall in an attempt to escape, but struck and burst a pipe, which sprayed water into the cupboard and caused her eventual death by hypothermia. She was found several days later.
Jasmine Beever		7 September 2017	England	The 16-year-old from Skegness died of peritonitis brought about by Rapunzel syndrome. She had a long-time habit of chewing and swallowing her own hair, which formed a hairball in her stomach that led to an infection in her abdomen, damaging her vital organs.
Raildo Matias Santos		22 October 2017	Brazil	The epileptic 49-year-old in Jaguaquara tried to fetch a 20-litre (4.4 imp gal; 5.3 US gal) bucket of water while intoxicated, tripped, and fell in a kneeling position, drowning in the bucket.
Hidr Korkmaz		12 November 2017	Unknown Eastern European country	The 42-year-old Turkish-Dutch drug dealer and informant died when he threw his fishhook into an electrical cable while fishing somewhere in Eastern Europe. Though he was a witness in the case against Dutch criminal Willem Holleeder, he was not considered a crucial asset by authorities, who treated his death as an accident.
Ateef Rafiq		16 March 2018	England	The 24-year-old was looking for his dropped mobile phone in a movie theater in Birmingham when his head became wedged under the electronic footrest of a seat, causing him to die from cardiac arrest.
Elaine Herzberg		18 March 2018	United States	The 49-year-old from Tempe, Arizona, died after being hit by a self-driving car operated by Uber as she crossed the road, in what was reported to be the first death of a pedestrian struck by a self-driving car on public roads. In response to the fatal accident, Uber suspended self-driving car tests in all U.S. cities.
Kyle Plush		10 April 2018	United States	The 16-year-old died from asphyxia after being trapped in his Honda Odyssey in his school's parking lot in Cincinnati, Ohio. Attempting to reach his tennis equipment, he leaned over the third row of seats into the trunk. When the seats "squashed his chest", he became pinned and called 9–1–1 twice by using his smartphone's voice assistant. Responding to the calls, the police were unable to find him; his father eventually discovered him dead in the vehicle about six hours later.
Jennifer Riordan		17 April 2018	United States	The 43-year-old bank executive and businesswoman aboard Southwest Airlines Flight 1380 died after debris from an engine failure destroyed a window near her seat and she was partially blown out through it.
Hildegard Whiting		27 July 2018	United States	The 77-year-old from Seattle died of asphyxiation from the carbon dioxide vapors produced by four dry ice coolers in a Dippin' Dots delivery car. The driver's wife had borrowed the car to take Whiting home.
Richard Russell		10 August 2018	United States	The 28-year-old ground service agent stole a Bombardier Q400 owned by Horizon Air and operating for Alaska Airlines from Seattle–Tacoma International Airport. After an unauthorized takeoff, he flew the plane for just over an hour and performed aerial maneuvers including a barrel roll before intentionally crashing on Ketron Island, Washington, killing himself. No one else was injured.
Sam Ballard		2 November 2018	Australia	The 28-year-old from Sydney died from angiostrongyliasis after eating a garden slug as a dare eight years earlier.
John Allen Chau		17 November 2018	India	The 26-year-old Christian missionary was shot by an arrow from a Sentinelese tribesman after he illegally trespassed onto North Sentinel Island. Indian rescuers were not able to recover his body due to safety concerns about a possible conflict with the uncontacted tribe.
Unknown woman		2019	Australia	The 76-year-old farmer was collecting chicken eggs at her property in South Australia when a rooster pecked her twice in the left leg, puncturing varicose veins. She subsequently collapsed and died from blood loss.
Unknown man		January 2019	United States	A 54-year-old construction worker from Massachusetts died after eating a bag and a half of black liquorice every day for a few weeks, which caused such low potassium levels in his body that his heart stopped.
Salvatore Disi		10 January 2019	United States	The 62-year-old was using a power cart to jump start a helicopter in Hernando County, Florida, when its unexpected up-and-down motion caused the rotor blades to strike and decapitate him.
Margaret Maurer		5 March 2019	United States	The 21-year-old Tulane University fourth-year student from Forest Lake, Minnesota, died at a highway rest stop in Mississippi when a pair of tires that came loose from a passing tractor-trailer struck her.
Julian Nott		26 March 2019	United States	The 74-year-old British-American balloonist was mortally injured after landing safely near Warner Springs, California, at the end of a test flight of an experimental high-altitude balloon. After Nott and his passenger reentered the balloon's gondola, it rolled down a steep ravine.
Patrick McGuire		April 2019	Scotland	The 67-year-old American tourist died from positional asphyxia at a hotel near Inverness when a 72-kilogram (159 lb) metal garden bench he was sitting on toppled backward, pinning him against a wall which had knocked him unconscious. It was later found that such benches had a risk of sinking into the grass and there were no appropriate checks to provide a stable surface for them.
Darren Hickey		5 April 2019	England	The 51-year-old wedding planner from Horwich ate a scalding-hot fishcake at a wedding that burned his throat, suffocating him to death. The pathologist who performed the autopsy called the case "extremely rare" and likened it to those of victims who inhaled smoke during house fires. Hickey had received a set of false teeth following a previous event.
Luke Goodere		11 April 2019	Thailand	The 33-year-old British national living in Australia was staying at a hotel on the Phi Phi Islands when he tripped over a suitcase in his room and fell into a glass balcony door. The shattered glass embedded itself into the man's abdomen, causing his death by blood loss.
Marvin Hajos		12 April 2019	United States	The 75-year-old exotic animal collector living at a farm near Alachua, Florida, was attacked and killed by his recently purchased pet cassowary. The large bird repeatedly kicked Hajos, which punctured his skin and severed the brachial artery in his arm. Hajos was declared dead by the time paramedics arrived at the scene, and the cassowary was auctioned off to a different owner.
Paul McDonald		17 April 2019	Australia	The 47-year-old was attacked and killed by a pet deer, said to be an elk, on his property near Wangaratta.
Joemar Jungco		22 June 2019	Philippines	The 18-year-old worker at a meat processing facility in Iloilo City died after half his body from the head down to the waist was pulled into a meat mixer.
Lee Dingle		18 July 2019	United States	The 37-year-old was playing with his children on the beach of Oak Island, North Carolina, when he was struck by a wave and slammed into the sand. His neck was broken on impact, causing his throat to swell and leading to cerebral hypoxia.
Yulia Sharko		8 September 2019	Belarus	The 21-year-old from Žabinka was celebrating her birthday with friends when she tried to pull her two-year-old daughter out through the window of her car. Her daughter accidentally activated the window control button, closing the window and strangling Sharko.
Subhash Yadav		November 2019	India	The 42-year-old man agreed to a food challenge with his friend while at a market in Jaunpur, Uttar Pradesh, each betting 2,000 rupee to see who could eat 50 eggs in one sitting. Yadav lost consciousness after eating 41 eggs and died at a hospital, which listed the cause of death as overeating.
Sarah Tonkin		13 December 2019	Australia	The 37-year-old was driving near Balliang East when a 13 kilograms (29 lb) pintle hook came loose from a flatbed truck in front of her. The hook was sent airborne after being struck by the tyres of a second passing truck and broke through Tonkin's windshield, killing her.

== 2020s ==
Name of person	Image	Date of death	Country	Details
Unknown man		January 2020	Czech	The 35-year-old factory worker died after attempting to perform autoerotic anal stimulation at his factory job using a inflatable rubber pipe stopper connected to an air blow gun. The device spontaneously burst inside of him, causing his rectum to explode and leading to a severe brain hemorrhage.
Yuri Alferov, Natalya Monakova, and Valentin Didenko		28 February 2020	Russia	Pharmacist blogger Yekaterina Didenko was celebrating her 29th birthday at a sauna complex in Moscow. Her husband Valentin brought 25 kg (55 lb) of dry ice, which was dumped into an indoor swimming pool, releasing a layer of carbon dioxide fog. Several party-goers jumped into the water and started to lose consciousness due to the gas. Two of them drowned; Valentin died in intensive care several hours later.
Unknown man		14 August 2020	Australia	The 56-year-old died of blunt force trauma after an 18-kilogram (40 lb) Spanish mackerel "launched itself" into the man's chest as he was fishing off Cullen Bay.
Charles Majawa		17 August 2020	Malawi	The 35-year-old man died while engaged in intercourse with a sex worker in Phalombe District. The cause of death was ascribed to "excessive orgasm", which caused the rupture of blood vessels in the man's brain.
Carrie O'Connor		14 September 2020	United States	The 38-year-old Boston University lecturer carried a long package into the antiquated elevator in her residential building and accidentally hit the 'Go' gate switch at the top of the car with it, which was normally triggered by a closed gate. Because a maintenance worker in the basement had just called for the car the elevator dropped rapidly before she was fully inside the elevator and O'Connor became pinned between the wall and the elevator. She died of traumatic asphyxia according to authorities.
Christian Bolok		26 October 2020	Philippines	The 38-year-old lieutenant, who was the police chief of San Jose, Northern Samar, died during a raid to shut down a cockfight, which the government had banned due to the COVID-19 pandemic. He was trying to grab a cockfighting rooster when the metal blade attached to the rooster's spur cut a gaping hole in Bolok's leg and sliced his femoral artery, causing him to bleed to death.
Mohsen Fakhrizadeh		27 November 2020	Iran	The 59-year-old nuclear scientist was assasinated by an unmanned, satellite-controlled machine gun that was smuggled and planted onto a roadside pickup truck in Absard, Iran. His accompanying wife and security detail were unharmed during the drive-by, which suggests the weapon was intelligence-assisted.
Luke Ramone Harper		2 April 2021	Ireland	The 8-year-old from Ringsend, Dublin, died after inhaling helium from a balloon that he placed over his head. The balloon had been bought for his birthday a week prior.
Amy Carlson		c. 16 April 2021	United States	The corpse of the 45-year-old leader of Love Has Won was discovered by police on 28 April 2021, with estimates placing her death c. 16 April 2021. Her remains were mummified and wrapped in a sleeping bag, decorated with Christmas lights; her eyes were missing, and her eye sockets had been decorated with glitter. An autopsy determined that she died of alcohol abuse, anorexia, and chronic colloidal silver ingestion.
Unknown man		May 2021	Spain	A 39-year-old man's body was found wedged inside the hind leg of a papier-mâché statue of a Stegosaurus in Santa Coloma de Gramenet. Initial police reports did not suspect foul play. A police representative hypothesised that the individual may have crawled inside headfirst to retrieve a lost mobile phone before his leg became stuck, trapping him inside. Firefighters had to cut the statue apart to extract the body; police observers believed that he may have been trapped for "a couple of days". Local media claimed that the victim's family reported him missing only hours prior to the discovery. The body was discovered when a man and his son noticed an unusual smell from the statue, and saw the body through a crack in the statue.
Halyna Hutchins		21 October 2021	United States	On the set of the film Rust near Santa Fe, New Mexico, the 42-year-old Ukrainian cinematographer was accidentally shot by actor Alec Baldwin with a revolver that he was using as a prop. Director Joel Souza was also non-fatally injured by the bullet.
Unknown man		30 October 2021	Brazil	A 30-year-old man was fishing with two friends at a lake in Brasilândia de Minas when the group was attacked by bees. He and his friends jumped into the lake to escape the bees, but the man drowned and was partially eaten by piranhas; his friends survived.
Victims of the 2021 Hillcrest Primary School accident		16 December 2021	Australia	An unusually strong gust of wind in Devonport, Tasmania, lifted an inflatable jumping castle approximately 10 metres (33 ft) in the air while seven children were inside. Five of them fell to their deaths, while the sixth victim died from a falling leaf blower that was used to inflate the castle.
Teddy Balkind		6 January 2022	United States	The 16-year-old student at St. Luke's School in New Canaan, Connecticut, fell during a junior varsity ice hockey game when another player, who was unable to stop in time, accidentally cut Balkind's neck with his skate's blade. Balkind died following an emergency operation.
Dolores Olive Boschert		24 May 2022	United States	The 23-year-old paramedic was exercising alone on a Smith machine at a Planet Fitness gymnasium in St. Charles, Missouri, when she was pinned by a barbell due to unknown circumstances. Another patron found her 30 minutes later, and she was pronounced dead at the scene.
Maya Murmu		June 2022	India	The 68-year-old from Odisha, India, was trampled to death by an elephant. Later, at her funeral, what may have been the same elephant came back and attacked her corpse by picking up her body and throwing her in the air.
Klil Kimhi		21 July 2022	Israel	The 32-year-old fell to his death when a sinkhole opened under a swimming pool he was in at a house party in Karmi Yosef.
Anne Heche		11 August 2022	United States	On 5 August 2022, while driving in Mar Vista, Los Angeles, the 53-year-old American actress crashed her 2022 Mini Clubman three times in close succession. The car crashed into a wall in an apartment complex parking area and a Jaguar before embedding itself in a two-story house, which caught fire, trapping Heche in her burning car for 45 minutes. After being rescued, Heche sat up on her stretcher and struggled with firefighters, but then lost consciousness. Heche was declared brain dead on 11 August but was kept on life support until 14 August to preserve her organs for donation.
Jermani Thompson		30 August 2022	United States	The 26-year-old baggage handler at Louis Armstrong New Orleans International Airport died of severe injuries after her hair became stuck in the baggage handling system.
Courtney Edwards		31 December 2022	United States	The 34-year-old baggage handler at Montgomery Regional Airport died after being sucked into a plane's engine.
Coi Ngaa-sin		20 January 2023	Hong Kong	The 61-year-old butcher was killed by a pig at the Sheung Shui Slaughterhouse. The pig had already been stunned by electric shock, but suddenly woke up, knocking him to the ground. He suffered a cut to the artery near his left knee from a 38 centimetres (15 in) cleaver and later died at the North District Hospital.
Joseph Smith		21 January 2023	United States	The 30-year-old man was shot and killed by his dog after the animal stepped on a loaded rifle in the back seat of his pickup truck, causing the gun to fire through the front passenger seat and hit him in the back near Geuda Springs, Kansas. The driver of the truck, who was sitting next to Smith at the time of the accident, was unharmed.
Shivdayal Sharma		18 April 2023	India	The 82-year-old former electrician of India's National Railway Company was urinating on the Vande Bharat line railroad tracks in Alwar, when a Vande Bharat train struck a cow, launching the animal nearly 100 ft (30 m) into the air before it landed on Sharma, killing him instantly. The cow also died.
Barry Griffiths		June 2023	Wales	The 57-year-old man, who had suffered a stroke that reduced the mobility of one arm, accidentally stabbed himself in the stomach while attempting to separate frozen burgers with a knife in his home in Llandrindod Wells. Atherosclerosis was also a contributing factor in Griffiths' death. Police did not discover Griffiths' body in his apartment until over a week after he died.
Mikala Jones		9 July 2023	Indonesia	The 44-year-old was killed in a surfing accident in North Sipora, after the fin of his surfboard severed his femoral artery.
Justyn Vicky		17 July 2023	Indonesia	On 15 July 2023, the 33-year-old bodybuilder and influencer was squatting over 180 kilograms (400 lb) at a Denpasar gym, assisted by a spotter, when the weight snapped his head forward, breaking his neck. Vicky died in the hospital 2 days later.
Giacomo Chiapparini		6 August 2023	Italy	The 74-year-old cheesemaker was inspecting his warehouse in Romano di Lombardia when one of the shelves collapsed, crushing him under thousands of Grana Padano cheese wheels, each wheel weighing approximately 40 kilograms (88 lb).
Adam Johnson		28 October 2023	England	The 29-year-old American member of the Nottingham Panthers (professional ice hockey team in the British Elite League) died after his neck was cut by a skate during a game between the Panthers and the Sheffield Steelers.
Sanjay Shah (Note: Some early reports erroneously said "Sanjay Singh", but the correct name is "Sanjay Shah".) and Raju Datla		18 January 2024. Shah died c. 18–19 January, Datla died 19 July.	India (Shah); United States (Datla)	Sanjay Shah (the 56-year-old CEO of Vistex) and Raju Datla (the company president) were celebrating the company's 25th anniversary at Ramoji Film City studio in India. As part of the celebration, Shah and Datla were being lowered from the ceiling in an "iron cage"; a cable broke, and both men fell more than 15 ft (4.6 m) onto the concrete stage, killing Shah and leaving Datla in critical condition. Datla died of his injuries six months later at Northwestern Memorial Hospital in Chicago, at the age of 54.
Lucy Morgan		5 June 2024	United States	The 6-year-old girl was with her family on vacation in Limerick, Maine, on 1 June, when, while playing badminton with her family, her brother's aluminium racket shaft broke and pierced her in the skull. She was taken to hospital, where she died from her injuries four days later.
Giulia Manfrini		18 October 2024	Indonesia	The 36-year-old Italian surfer died while surfing near the coast of West Sumatra after a swordfish pierced her chest.
Johnnie Turner		22 October 2024	United States	The 76-year-old member of the Kentucky Senate died of injuries sustained in an accident on 15 September 2024, when he drove a riding mower into an empty swimming pool.
Lester Clayton Harvey Jr.		9 December 2024	United States	A group of hunters chased a bear into a tree, and as the group retreated from the bottom of the tree, one hunter shot the bear. As the animal fell, it struck the 58-year-old from Phenix, Virginia, who stood about 10 feet (3.0 m) from the tree, killing him. The bear also died.
Anand Kumar Yadav		14 December 2024	India	The 35-year-old man swallowed a live baby chick, measuring 20-centimetre (7.9 in), as part of a fertility ritual. He was found dead while taking a bath at his home in Surguja district, Chhattisgarh, after the bird, having remained lodged in his throat, caused the man to asphyxiate. The chick was found alive during the autopsy the same day, but died shortly after extraction.
Nguyễn Xuân Đạt		25 January 2025	Vietnam	The 35-year-old laborer and fishmonger was voluntarily slaughtered while masturbating and subsequently eaten by Đoàn Văn Sáng, a market management staff in Lạng Sơn province. Đạt had reportedly shown signs of autassassinophilia through online activities. Sáng filmed the killing from multiple angles and the subsequent cooking of his organs. In July later that year, the footage surfaced on Telegram, allegedly sold on dark web markets and later released on shock sites, triggering an investigation from independent Vietnamese members of the public through open-source intelligence. A document compiled by the investigators, which was released on November 23, pointed to Sáng as the assailant. Sáng was officially arrested by the police on November 29.
Ethan Alexander Ackerman		25 January 2025	United States	The 20-year-old Clemson University student was cleaning up debris around fallen trees in Anderson, South Carolina when one of the trees sprang upright, trapping him under its base. Ackerman died of "blunt force chest trauma resulting in traumatic asphyxiation".
Davi Nunes Moreira		14 February 2025	Brazil	The 14-year-old boy from Planalto, Bahia, injected the remains of a dead butterfly mixed with water into his leg, which led to septic shock that was possibly caused by toxins in the butterfly.
Keith McAllister		17 July 2025	United States	The 61-year-old man died after he was sucked into an MRI magnet at a medical center in Westbury, New York, while wearing 20 pounds (9 kg) of chains for strength training. He died in the hospital the following day.
Jimmy Forkin		6 August 2025	Ireland	The 69-year-old man died on his farm in Kilkelly while spraying weeds when the quad bike pulling the spraying equipment suddenly reversed. The vehicle pushed the farmer into a water-filled ditch and kept him pinned upside down while he drowned.
Daniel and Cooper Owen		15 October 2025	Laos	The 47-year-old private school teacher and his 15-year-old son, both Americans living in Vietnam at the time, were stung over 100 times by an unexpected swarm of giant hornets while zip lining at Green Jungle Park near Luang Prabang while on an adventure holiday in Laos. They were transported to a hospital where they died hours later.
Two unknown men		7 December 2025	Russia	A pilot and a navigator, both Russians, died of injuries sustained upon collision with a hangar ceiling after the aircraft ejection system unexpectedly activated on a parked Sukhoi Su-34. Both men were thrown upward at a sufficient vertical speed to cause "injuries incompatible with life".
Michael Dickinson		23 December 2025	United States	The 69-year-old grandfather died at a McDonald's drive thru in Grand Island, Nebraska after his upper body got pinned between the car door frame and the payment window while reaching out to pay for his food.
Brooke Day (Note: Initially reported by Japanese police as Ella Day Brooke and later corrected by Australian media.)		30 January 2026	Japan	The 22-year-old Australian tourist was boarding a ski lift at Tsugaike Kogen Ski Resort in Otari, Nagano Prefecture, when her backpack's waist belt buckle became caught in the lift carriage. She was dragged along the snow and suspended in mid-air, where she suffered a fatal cardiac arrest.
Adham Faisal		8 March 2026	Malaysia	The 18-year-old student was a passenger on a motorcycle driven by his friend on a road in Teluk Intan when he was accidentally cut in the neck by a sickle, carried by the passenger of another passing motorcycle.
Jeff Webb		19 March 2026	United States	The 76-year-old American businessman, executive, publisher, and conservative activist died from a severe head injury sustained in a fall while playing pickleball in Memphis, Tennessee. He was pulled from a life-support system two weeks following the incident.
Marlene van Staden		31 March 2026	South Africa	The 26-year-old photographer was electrocuted after her extended monopod made contact with a power line in Mossel Bay.
Ray Hartmann		23 April 2026	United States	The 73-year-old journalist was driving on Interstate 64 near St. Louis when a semi-trailer truck ahead of his vehicle lost two tires, which bounced off the median strip and went airborne. One tire struck the man's windshield and killed him.
Jake Hall		6 May 2026	Spain	The 35-year-old English television personality was found dead at a friend's villa in Mallorca, having sustained severe head and chest injuries from cut glass. No cause of death was determined.
Maria Eduarda Rodrigues de Freitas		13 June 2026	Brazil	The 21-year-old physical education student was thrown from the Ponte do Esqueleto bridge in Limeira, São Paulo, from a height of 40 metres (130 ft) by two instructors from a rope jumping company, without being connected to safety ropes, as they forgot to attach them to her.
Brittany Clark		28 June 2026	United States	The 31-year-old woman was fatally mauled by an alligator while swimming in the Econlockhatchee River in Florida's Little Big Econ State Forest.
Redeemer Grima		10 August 2026	Malta	The 41-year-old professional diver drowned while working at a fish farm off St Paul's Island after a tuna got stuck on part of his equipment. Amidst his attempts to free himself, his scuba tank disattached. The tuna was also found dead.
Rogério Renato Mateucci		16 October 2026	United States	The 55-year-old Brazilian rector at Pontifical Catholic University of Paraná and visiting scholar at Arizona State University was touring the historic Taliesin West home of architect Frank Lloyd Wright in Scottsdale, Arizona, when an acrylic piece of roof was dislodged by strong winds and fatally struck Mateucci in the head.
Patricio Alfredo Sánchez Molinari		17 October 2026	Ecuador	The 52-year-old priest died after a large crucifix fell on him during a livestreamed mass in Guayaquil.
Adilson Masaro		21 October 2026	Brazil	The 48-year-old man was visiting his father's grave at the São José Municipal Cemetery in Linhares after attending a friend's funeral service. While sitting on the grave marker slab, the structure collapsed, causing the man to fall into the tomb, dying of fall injuries.
