= Plush (disambiguation) =

Plush is a textile having a cut nap or pile the same as fustian or velvet.

Plush may also refer to:

== Places ==
- Plush, Dorset, a village in Dorset, England
- Plush, Oregon, an unincorporated community in Lake County, Oregon, USA

== People ==
- Plush (musician) or Liam Hayes, American entertainer
- Jeff Plush, U.S. sports official
- Kyle Plush, vehicular asphyxiation victim in death of Kyle Plush
- Tony Plush (born 1980), alter ego of American baseball player Nyjer Morgan
- Vincent Plush (born 1950), Australian composer

== Entertainment ==
- "Plush" (song), by Stone Temple Pilots
- Plush (film), a 2013 American film
- Plush (novel), a 2013 movie tie-in novel by Kate Crash prequel to the eponymous 2013 film
- Plush (band), an American heavy metal music band

== Other uses ==
- Plush, an Australian furniture retailer owned by Fantastic Holdings
- Plurisubharmonic function
- Sithon nedymond, the plush, a butterfly in the family Lycaenidae
