= Planalto =

Planalto (Portuguese for "plateau") may refer to:

== Buildings ==
- Palácio do Planalto, Brasília, the official seat of the President of Brazil
  - The staff and offices of the executive branch of the Brazilian Government, by metonymy

== Places ==
- Brazilian Highlands (Planalto Brasileiro), a region covering most of the eastern, southern, and central portions of Brazil
- Planalto, Bahia
- Planalto, Paraná
- Planalto, Rio Grande do Sul
- Planalto, São Paulo

== Other uses ==
- CAP-1 Planalto, a Brazilian trainer aircraft
