= 2006 Dreamspace V incident =

Fatal art accident in Durham, England

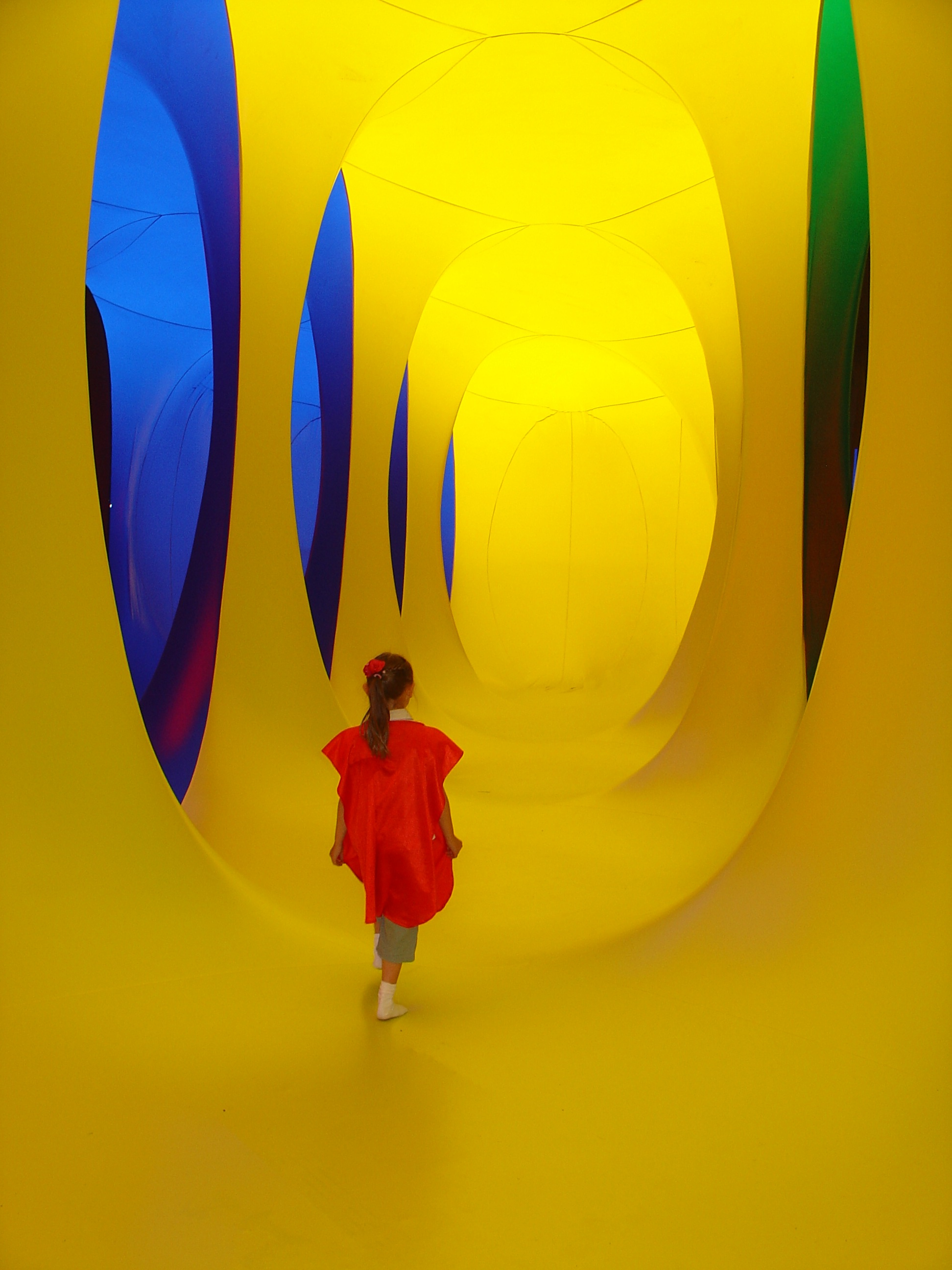
Dreamspace in Liverpool, United Kingdom

The 2006 Dreamspace V incident was an accidental liftoff of the art piece Dreamspace V by Maurice Agis in Riverside Park, County Durham, England, in 2006 that resulted in the deaths of two people and multiple injuries. The attraction had not been securely tied down to the ground, causing a high gust of wind to throw it in the air before crashing into a nearby car park.

On 23 July 2006, unexpected wind gusts loosened the inflatable structure from its moorings, causing the art piece to lift into the air. Claire Furmedge (born c. 1968) and Elizabeth Collings (born c. 1938) were inside the inflatable structure when it lifted into the air, folded over itself, and crashed into a nearby carpark, where both were killed after falling out of the structure. About 20–30 others were inside the structure when it lifted into the air.

A CCTV camera filmed the fatal liftoff, and the post the camera was mounted on caught part of Dreamspace after it lifted off the ground.

The event is officially listed as a Dust Devil by the European Severe Storms Laboratory.

== Investigation and litigation ==
A lengthy investigation began immediately after the end of the incident. Durham police and the Health and Safety Executive created a joint investigation into the incident. The Dreamspace structure was confiscated by police after the incident.

Maurice Agis, the artist behind Dreamspace, was fined £10,000 for health and safety violations in 2009. Agis was charged with manslaughter for the deaths of Furmedge and Collings, but the jury was discharged after being unable to make a verdict.

In 2011, a High Court judge ruled that the event organizer, a company named Brouhaha, and Chester-le-Street District Council were culpable for the damages. Although the exact amount of compensation was not detailed to the public, Brouhaha was ordered to pay 55% of the compensatory damages and the Council 45%.

== See also ==
- 2021 Hillcrest Primary School accident – An accident caused by an inflatable bouncy castle being picked up by sudden wind gusts
