= Death of Kyle Plush =

2018 death in Cincinnati, Ohio

Kyle Plush
- Undated photo of Plush
- Born: September 30, 2001
- Died: April 10, 2018 (aged 16); Cincinnati, Ohio, U.S.
- Cause of death: Asphyxia due to chest compression
- Education: Seven Hills School
- Known for: Death following entrapment in a 2004 Honda Odyssey seat and failures in emergency response
- Website: Kyle Plush Answer The Call Foundation

On April 10, 2018, Kyle Jacob Plush, a 16‑year‑old student at Seven Hills School in Cincinnati, Ohio, died after becoming trapped in the rear compartment of his family's 2004 Honda Odyssey, which was parked in the school's lot. While pinned inside the vehicle, he placed two 911 calls reporting that he could not free himself and giving information intended to help responders locate him. Officers were dispatched to the school but did not find the van, and Plush was later discovered by his father.

His death, ruled accidental and caused by asphyxia from chest compression, led to scrutiny of the city's emergency communications system, a review of police and dispatcher actions, and the creation of a nonprofit foundation established by his family to support improvements in 911 services.

== Background ==
Kyle Jacob Plush was born on September 30, 2001, and was the eldest child and only son of Jill Plush (née Zehren) and Ron Plush. He had a younger sister, Alli. At four months old, he experienced a serious medical complication when a routine procedure caused internal bleeding around his spinal cord. The pressure led to temporary paralysis and required urgent surgery. He recovered but had lasting physical challenges. During that period, he wore a back brace to maintain spinal alignment, and his care included regular trips to a specialist clinic in Minnesota for adjustments. He also had limited use of his right hand.

Plush remained active and pursued a wide range of interests. He enjoyed building projects, participated in several sports, and skied at a nearby resort. He was involved in the Boy Scouts and was working toward the rank of Eagle Scout. Plush attended Mercy Montessori School from 2008 until 2014 before transferring to Seven Hills School.

== Death ==
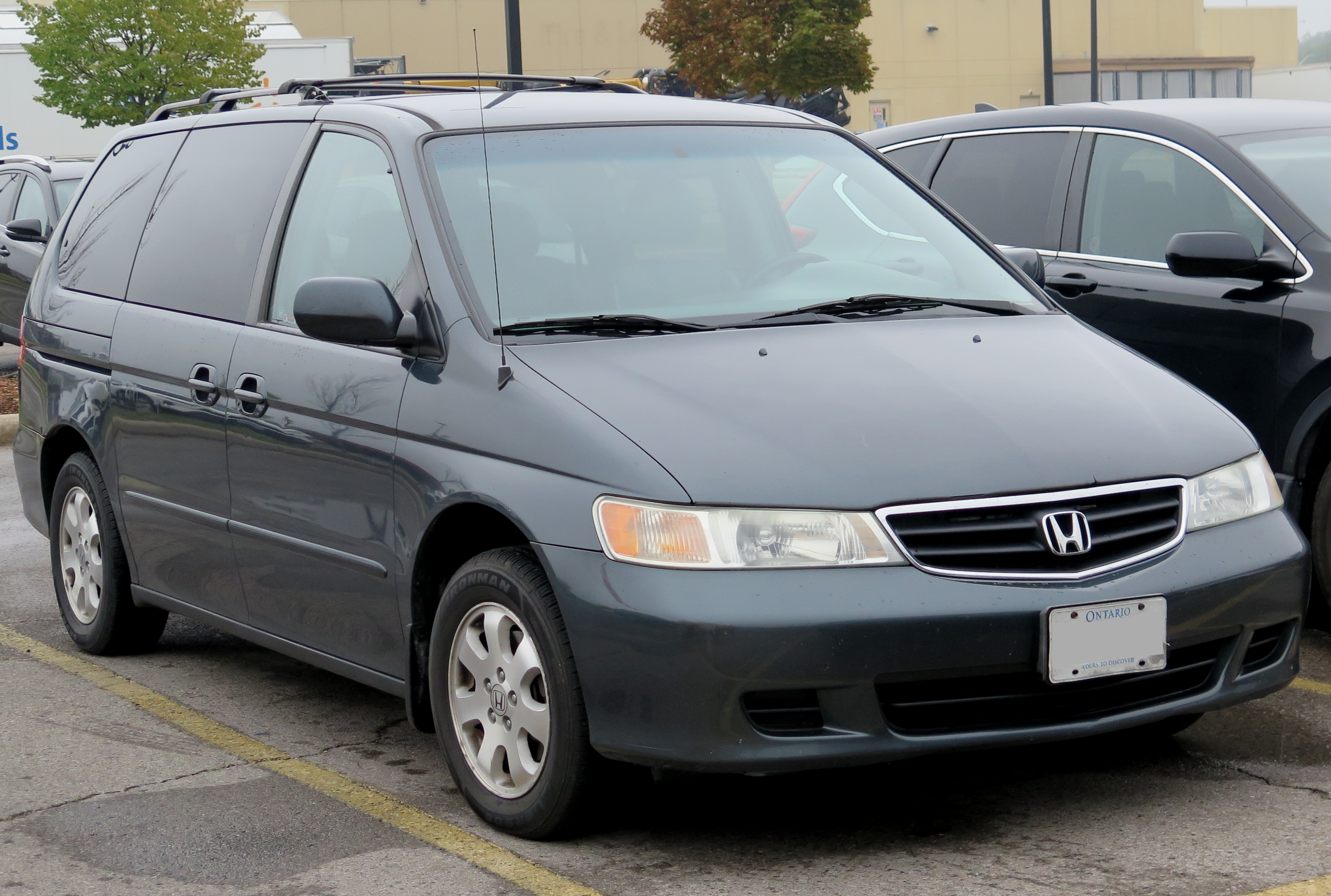
A vehicle similar to the Honda Odyssey in which Plush became trapped

On the afternoon of April 10, 2018, Plush walked to his family's 2004 Honda Odyssey, parked in the lot of the Seven Hills School campus, to retrieve equipment for a scheduled tennis match. He placed one knee on the third‑row bench seat and leaned forward into the rear cargo well, and the seat folded backward. The movement and weight of the seat pinned him upside down with his upper body in the rear well. About 80 lb (36 kg) of pressure compressed his chest, and his legs were raised against the back door. He could not free himself or exit the vehicle.

At 3:14 p.m., Plush used Siri to call 911, as his mobile phone was in his pocket and out of reach. He told the dispatcher that he was stuck in his van at Seven Hills School and later said, "Send help. I'm going to die here." The call disconnected, and the dispatcher attempted to call him back. The dispatcher obtained his first name, but it was not relayed to responding officers. The call was entered into the computer‑aided dispatch system seven minutes later as "unknown trouble," a classification that did not automatically involve fire‑rescue units.

Two Cincinnati Police Department officers were dispatched at 3:26 p.m. They drove into the parking lot from its southern side and remained on the property for around 11 minutes. They did not get out of their patrol car, did not check the northern section of the lot where the van was located, and did not enter the address into their in‑car mapping system or their mobile phones. Body‑camera footage later recorded one officer remarking that the call was probably unfounded.

At 3:34 p.m., while officers were still on the school grounds, Plush placed a second 911 call. The call‑taker activated the TTY system used for deaf or hard‑of‑hearing callers, and when no response appeared, the call was not switched back to standard voice mode. Plush asked that his mother be told he loved her if he died, said, "This is not a joke", again gave his vehicle and location, and added, "I'm almost dead." The dispatcher did not create a second CAD entry or notify the officers that the same caller had made another emergency call; she later said she was unable to hear him and that her computer froze. She was placed on administrative leave and later returned to work in a different capacity.

After Plush had been gone for around six hours, his father went to the school to look for him. Using location data from the family's Life360 app, he searched the grounds and located the van in the parking lot. One of the doors was unlocked, and inside he saw Plush's tennis racquet and backpack but did not immediately see him. After checking the rear area of the vehicle, he found Plush pinned beneath the bench seat. He lifted the seat to free him and performed CPR until emergency responders arrived, but Plush was pronounced dead at the scene.

=== Funeral ===
Plush's funeral was held on April 16, 2018, at St. Rose Church in Cincinnati. Large numbers of people attended the visitation, and the line extended from the funeral home into a nearby parking lot.

=== Tributes ===
In July 2020, it was reported that a pavilion at Stanbery Park in Mount Washington, Cincinnati, would be named in honor of Plush. That same month, Oakwood High School's boys' tennis team honored him during a match against his school by wearing wristbands with his initials and a heart and giving them to his teammates before play.

== Investigation and aftermath ==
The Hamilton County Coroner determined that Plush died from "asphyxia caused by chest compression" and ruled the death accidental.

Honda issued a statement to People on April 13 expressing condolences to the family and saying the company did not yet have enough information to determine what occurred. A spokesperson said, "Our hearts go out to the victim's family during this difficult time," and noted that there were no seat‑related recalls affecting the Odyssey model involved. The company also said that a separate recall announced the previous year applied only to 2011-2017 vehicles, in which second‑row seats could tip forward if not properly latched. The US National Highway Traffic Safety Administration said it had contacted Honda and would take "appropriate action." City Manager Harry Black resigned amid pressure following the issues at the 911 center. The city council approved about $450,000 for additional staff, improved training, upgraded technology, and workplace improvements.

A month after the funeral, Plush's mother, Jill, traveled to Knoxville, Tennessee, to visit a longtime friend. During the trip, Jill and her friend learned that the National Emergency Number Association was holding its annual conference in Nashville that week and decided to attend. The experience led to the creation of the Kyle Plush Answer the Call (KPATC) Foundation four months after his death. The organization was formed to support emergency communications personnel and promote improvements within the 911 system. Its activities include delivering encouragement to dispatch centers, presenting "Challenge Coin" awards to recognize notable performance, and giving educational presentations across the United States. During visits to call centers, Jill, Ron, and foundation volunteers have distributed coasters featuring the foundation logo, Plush's picture, and a message encouraging telecommunicators to be their best selves. Jill said the idea of striving to be his best reflected how her son lived.

In November 2018, Hamilton County Prosecutor Joe Deters announced that no criminal charges would be filed in connection with Plush's death, saying his office had reviewed the Cincinnati police and Hamilton County sheriff investigations and two independent reviews commissioned by the city. On August 12, 2019, Plush's family filed a wrongful‑death lawsuit against the City of Cincinnati, which also included the city manager, two police officers, and two 911 operators. On April 9, 2021, the case ended with a $6 million settlement, the second-largest in Cincinnati's history. As part of the agreement, the city pledged to improve the 911 call center, including $250,000 to hire experts to evaluate changes over five years and public reports released every six months.

City officials reported that several improvements have been made since the incident, including hiring additional call‑takers and dispatchers, adding full‑time quality‑assurance staff, and upgrading the backup call center where the emergency calls had been answered. The facility received new equipment and acoustic improvements to address communication issues identified after the event.

== See also ==
- List of unusual deaths in the 21st century
