= 2021 Hillcrest Primary School accident =

Fatal school accident in Australia

Hillcrest Primary School accident
- Location within Tasmania
- Date: 16 December 2021
- Time: Around 10 a.m. AEST
- Location: Devonport, Tasmania; 41°11′14″S 146°19′58″E
- Type: Inflatable castle accident
- Cause: Gusty winds
- Deaths: 6
- Injuries: 3

The Hillcrest Primary School accident was a fatal accident at the Hillcrest Primary School in Devonport, Tasmania, in which six children died and three were injured during end-of-year celebrations on the morning of 16 December 2021. The accident occurred after a jumping castle and several zorb balls lifted into the air due to a gust of wind, resulting in the children falling from approximately 10 metres (33 feet).

== Accident ==
The accident took place at Hillcrest Primary School during its Big Day In end-of-year celebrations, and was the last scheduled school day of the year for students. The school had numerous activities on site, including a jumping castle and inflatable zorb balls. At around 10 a.m., a gust of wind lifted the jumping castle and inflatable balls into the air, causing the children to fall from a distance of around ten metres. Seven children were inside the jumping castle when it became airborne, with five of them dying from the resulting injuries. Another child was killed waiting in line after being struck in the head by the airborne jumping castle blower. The school was soon closed and parents asked to collect their children "as a matter of urgency".

== Victims ==
Five children died at the time of the incident, and a sixth child, Chace Harrison, died from his injuries three days later, on 19 December 2021. Three children were severely injured, but recovered.

The families of the six children who died gave permission for news sources to identify the children by name:

- Addison Stewart (age 11)
- Zane Mellor (age 12)
- Jye Sheehan (age 12)
- Jalailah Jayne-Maree Jones (age 12)
- Peter Dodt (age 12)
- Chace Harrison (age 11)

== Funds ==
Following the event, a substantial number of resources were given to fund counselling services to children, first responders, teachers and other members of the school community, including $800,000 announced by Prime Minister Scott Morrison during his visit to the site on 18 December. A local Devonport resident, Zoe Smith, set up a GoFundMe page for donations to the Hillcrest Community Fund. The GoFundMe raised over $1.4 million.

Due to legal issues, no funds were released to families of victims until four months later, in March 2022. This was the subject of much criticism from community members, including Georgie Gardam, mother of victim Zane Mellor, who accused the Devonport City Council of ignoring families of the victims.

== Aftermath ==
The accident resulted in numerous organisations banning the use of all inflatables on their property, including the Tasmanian Department of Education, who announced the ban shortly after the accident. The accident was commemorated by a service in December 2022. In the reporting of the anniversary, it was revealed that of the 174 emergency service personnel who responded to the accident, an estimated twelve were still on mental health leave because of the accident.

In May 2023, it was reported that the Tasmanian state government was consulting on a permanent memorial for the accident. On 6 June 2025, the Devonport Magistrates Court acquitted charges against the operator of the jumping castle ruling that they were not guilty of criminal negligence.

== See also ==
- The Accident – a 2024 Mexican Netflix series similar to, but not based on, the event
- 2006 Dreamspace V incident: Another fatal accident caused when an inflatable art piece was lifted up by unexpected wind gusts.
- List of unusual deaths in the 21st century
