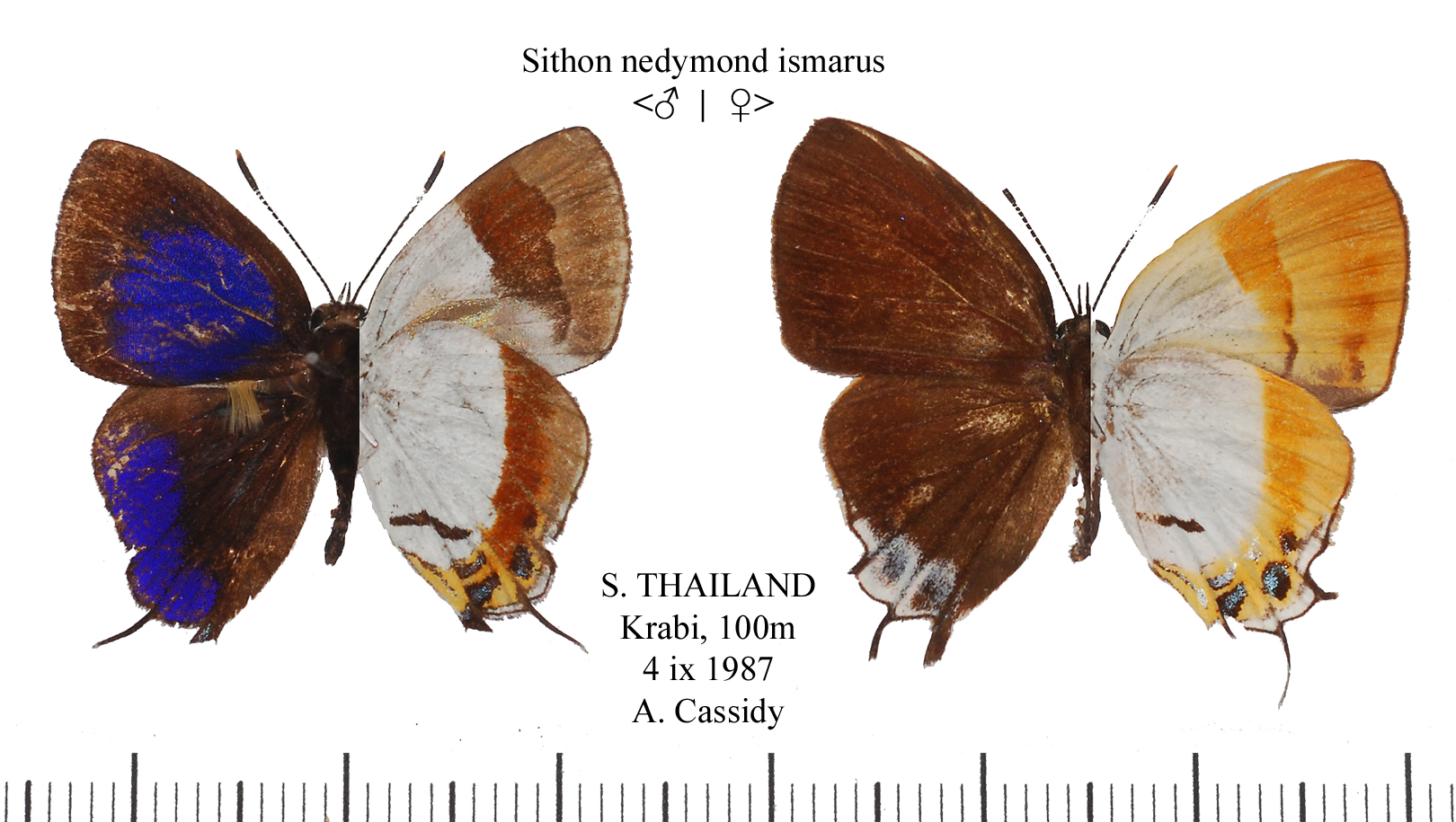
- Sithon nedymond

Scientific classification
- Kingdom: Animalia
- Phylum: Arthropoda
- Class: Insecta
- Order: Lepidoptera
- Family: Lycaenidae
- Tribe: Theclini
- Genus: Sithon; Hubner, 1819

= Sithon =

Butterfly genus in family Lycaenidae

Sithon is a genus of butterflies in the family Lycaenidae. The species of this genus are found in the Indomalayan realm.

== Species ==
- Sithon nedymond (Cramer, [1780])
- Sithon micea (Hewitson, 1869) Borneo
