= Maurice Agis =

British sculptor and artist (1931–2009)

- Agis receiving the Sikkens Award, 1967
- Born: 7 December 1931; London, England
- Died: 12 October 2009 (aged 77); Spain
- Education: Dutch Ministry of Education
- Known for: Sculpture
- Notable work: Dreamspace

Maurice Agis /ˈeɪɡɪs/ (7 December 1931 – 12 October 2009) was a British sculptor and artist whose Dreamspace projects drew the involvement and work of various schools and art institutions all over Britain. His disillusionment with galleries and museums led him to create his signature "interactive works" in the 1960s.

In July 2006, he came to wider attention after his work, Dreamspace V, came loose from its moorings in a park in Chester-le-Street, killing 2 people and injuring 13 others. In February 2008, he was charged with manslaughter over the Chester-le-Street incident. During the course of his trial, Agis vowed to never again make such large works.

== Biography ==
Agis was born in east London in 1931. Between 1950 and 1962, he studied painting and sculpture at Saint Martin's School of Art in London before going onto postgraduate works on De Stijl at the Dutch Ministry of Education in 1967.

His disillusionment with art galleries led to his collaboration with Peter Jones to create Spaceplace, the first of many "abstract walk-through spaces". Spaceplace was installed at the Museum of Modern Art, Oxford, in 1966 and the next year at the Stedelijk Museum, Amsterdam. Agis used the abilities of his art students while teaching at various installations between 1962 and 1973 (though the larger pieces were later manufactured overseas in countries such as Vietnam before being linked together in Britain).

After collaborating for 20 years, Agis and Jones went their separate ways. Agis's first solo project was Colourspace, which he presented for the first time in London in 1980 and later exhibited in Los Angeles and Brisbane, extending his profile. When Colourspace was exhibited in the German seaside town of Travemünde in July 1986, it lifted off the ground, injuring five people.

When constructing his works, Agis would often involve local schools in the areas where the work would be displayed.

Agis died on 12 October 2009, in Spain.

== Dreamspace V ==
On 22 July 2006, Agis installed Dreamspace V at Riverside Park, Chester-le-Street, the second of a three-part tour of Britain. The following day, echoing the events of ‘’Colourspace’’, the artwork left its moorings, soaring 30 ft (9.1 m) into the air before colliding with a CCTV pole, killing two people and injuring 13 others. Following the incident, Durham Police seized the remnants of Dreamspace and launched a joint investigation with the Health & Safety Executive.

Vandalism was immediately suspected: the artwork had been slashed with knives two weeks previously. While foul play was not completely ruled out, other avenues were also explored. Another theory was that the warm air on the Sunday had caused the artwork to become a "hot air balloon". The structure had undergone safety checks by a Chester-le-Street health and safety committee made up of police and fire service experts before it had opened to the public.

On 29 November 2006, Agis attended a police interview at Charing Cross police station, where he was arrested on suspicion of manslaughter. He was released on police bail, pending further enquiries. A statement was issued indicating that it would be summer 2007 at the earliest before the investigation was completed. Agis was due to answer bail on 3 September, but this was extended to the end of November.

On 13 February 2008, Agis was charged with gross negligence manslaughter. The trial began on 26 January 2009. Agis was convicted of a breach of the Health and Safety at Work etc. Act 1974 but the jury was unable to reach a verdict on the manslaughter charge; a few days later, the Crown Prosecution Service announced that there would be no retrial, no evidence was offered against him, and formal not guilty verdicts were returned. On 26 March 2009, Agis was fined £10,000 for the health and safety offences. On 12 August 2009, this fine was reduced to £2,500 on appeal.
