= Inflatable castle =

Temporary inflatable structure for play

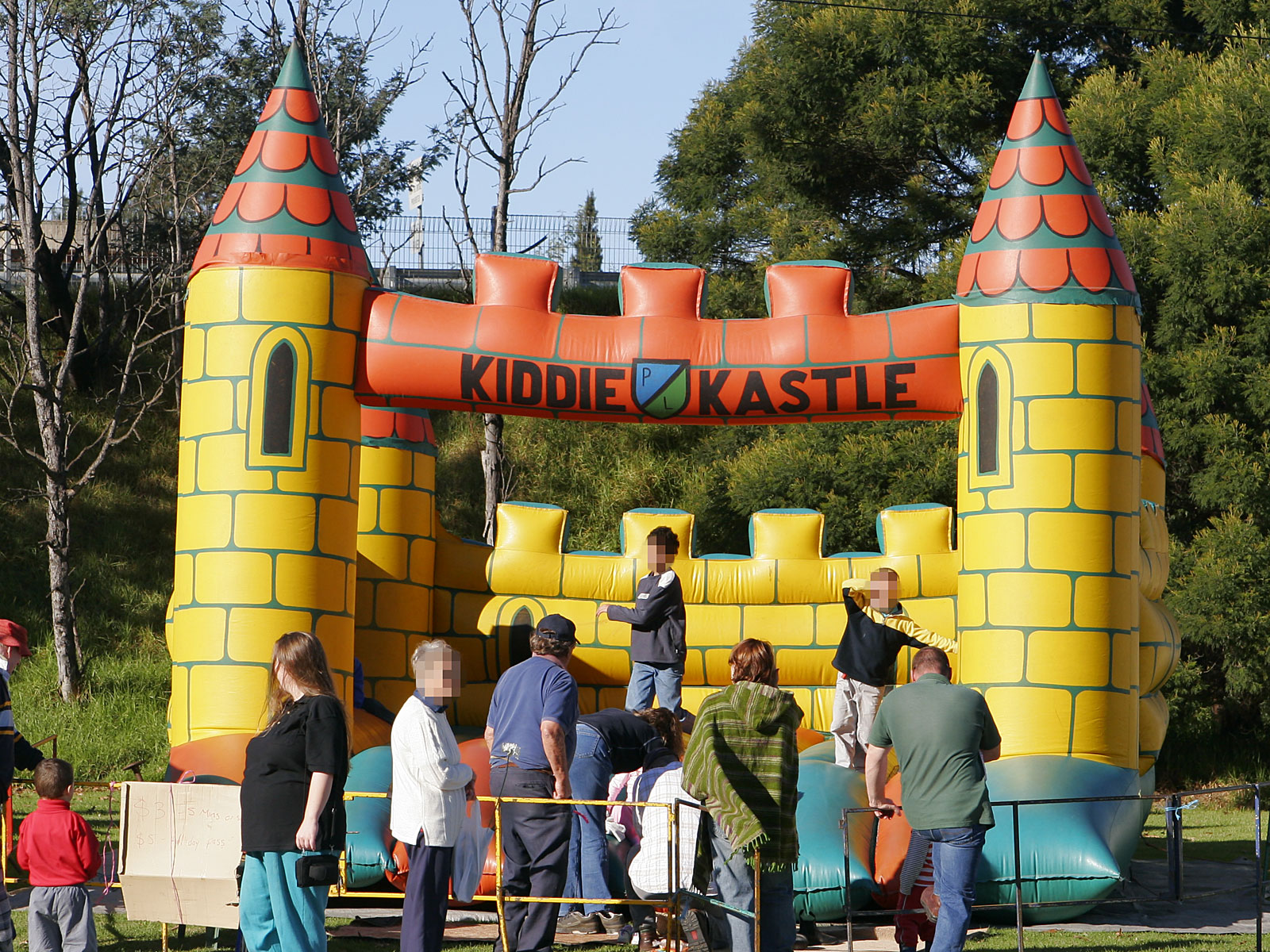
A bouncy castle

Inflatable castles (also called bouncy houses, bouncy castles, jumping castles, moon bounces, moonwalks, or closed inflatable trampolines) are temporary inflatable structures and buildings and similar items. They are rented for backyard and block party functions, school and church festivals and village fetes and used for recreational purposes. The growth in the use of such devices has led to a rental industry that includes inflatable slides, inflatable water slides, obstacle courses, and giant games, carnival games, and more.

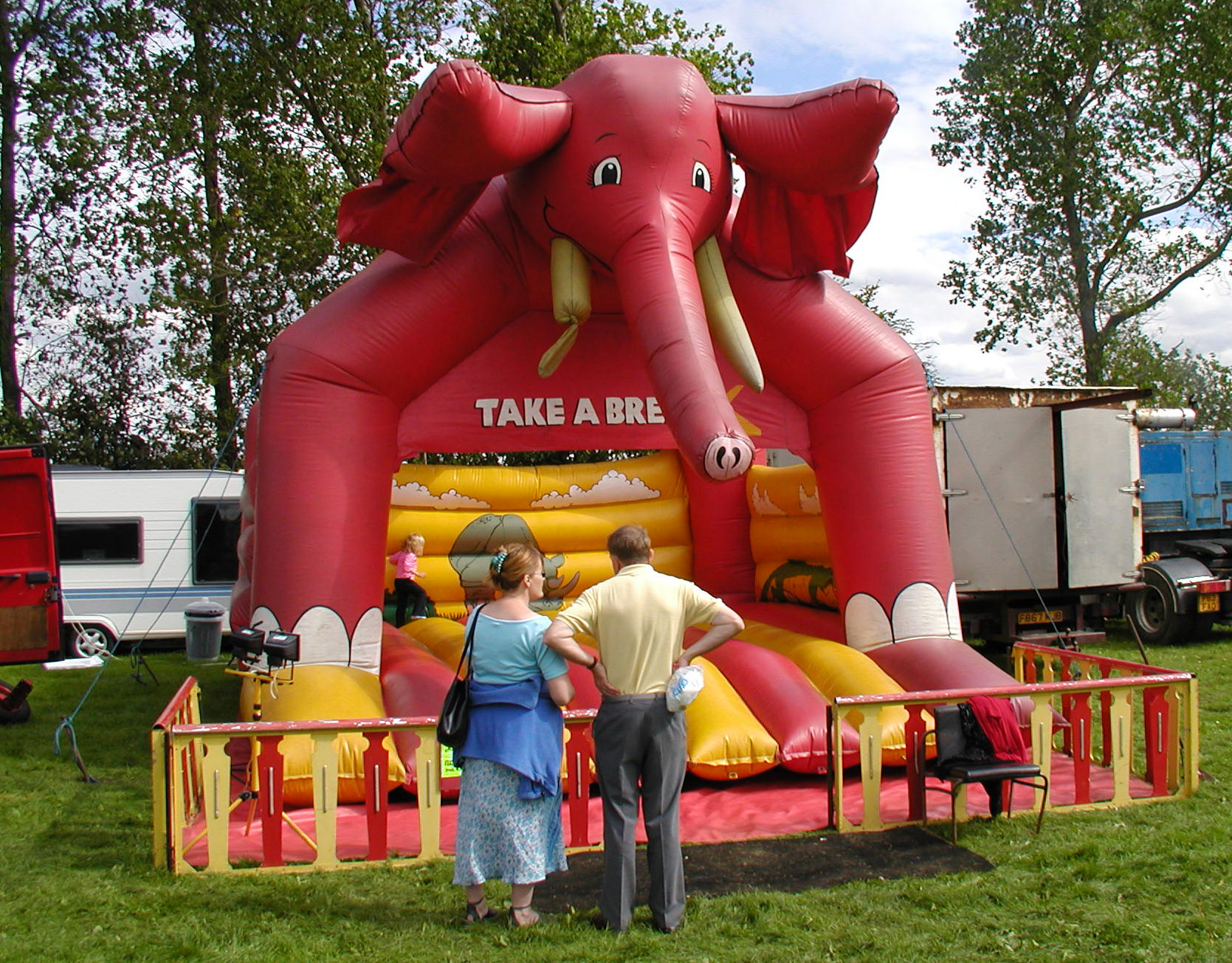
An inflatable shaped like an elephant

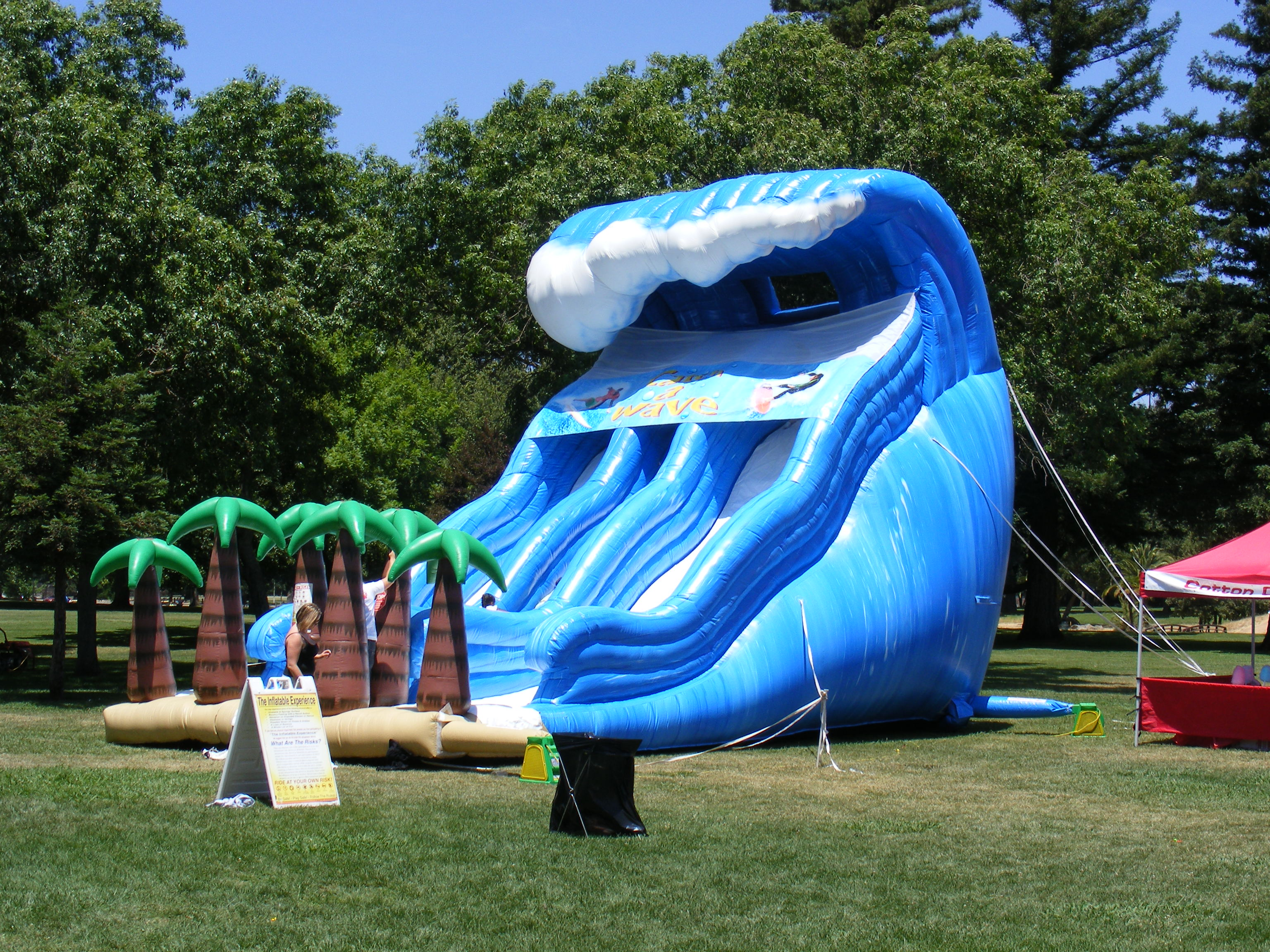
A "Catch A Wave" inflatable slide

Inflatable castles have been suggested as having some therapeutic value for children with certain sensory impairments, similar to ball pits. However, injuries are common.

== History ==
American engineer John Scurlock is credited as inventor of the modern inflatable tent design, in 1958. Scurlock, a plastics specialist who taught at Tulane University and worked for NASA, later also invented the Space Walk safety air cushion used by stunt performers and fire brigades responding to high-rise fires. According to his family, he was inspired in the late 1950s while designing inflatable tent covers for tennis courts. Scurlock's original design was known as the "Space Pillow", it had very little in common with modern bounce houses. In 1958 he also founded Space Walk Inc. In the 1980s the family business operated an indoor amusement park, The Fun Factory, in Metairie, Louisiana, and today continues to rent heavy-duty inflatables for occasions ranging from county fairs to children's birthday parties. The idea to rent inflatables for parties is attributed to Scurlock's wife Frances, who was running a rental business by 1969.

Bob Regehr is also credited for inventing the bouncy house in 1968, under the brand name Moon Walk.

As part of the space-themed toy trend sparked by the space race, 'The Moon Walk', a closed inflatable trampoline with a plastic roof designed for children's safety, was available for mail order in the 1975 Neiman Marcus catalog.

The original bouncy house was essentially an air pillow with a roof, but the hundreds of modern models include inflatable waterslides, basketball gyms, a game in which players attempt to knock each other over with a large inflatable wrecking ball, and characters licensed from multimedia franchises such as Frozen. Thousands of companies now rent inflatable castles in the United States. The market has also diversified to include lighter retail designs. By 2014, the industry was estimated to be worth $100 million.

The world's largest inflatable castle, The Big Bounce America, was certified in 2018 at 1,062.252 square metres (11,433.99 ft^{2}). It includes multiple zones, such as ball pits, an obstacle course, a slide, a basketball court, and a DJ booth. It was designed as an inflatable theme park for all ages, and started touring the United States in the summer of 2019 as a traveling festival.

With adult play a growing trend, bouncy castle rentals have also seen increased popularity at weddings.

Inflatable bouncy houses, slides, pools, and other large outdoor toys for retail home use became more popular in the summer of 2020 due to the COVID-19 pandemic, providing a means for parents to entertain their children while maintaining social distancing. With schools and daycares closed, parents bought inflatables to occupy their children while conducting remote work.

== Construction ==
The surfaces are typically composed of thick, strong PVC or vinyl and nylon, and the castle is inflated using an electric or petrol-powered blower. The principle is one of constant leakage, meaning small punctures are not a problem – a medium-size "bouncy castle" requires a fan with a mechanical output of about two horsepower (about 1.5 kW) and consumes around 2 kW of electrical power, allowing for the efficiency of the motor.

UK and Australian bouncy castles have specifications calling for fully inflated walls on three sides with an open front and foam "crash mats" to catch children who may jump or fall out of the structure.

Modern moonwalks in the US are typically supported by inflatable columns and enclosed with netting. The netting allows for supervision as adults can see in from all sides.

=== Standards ===
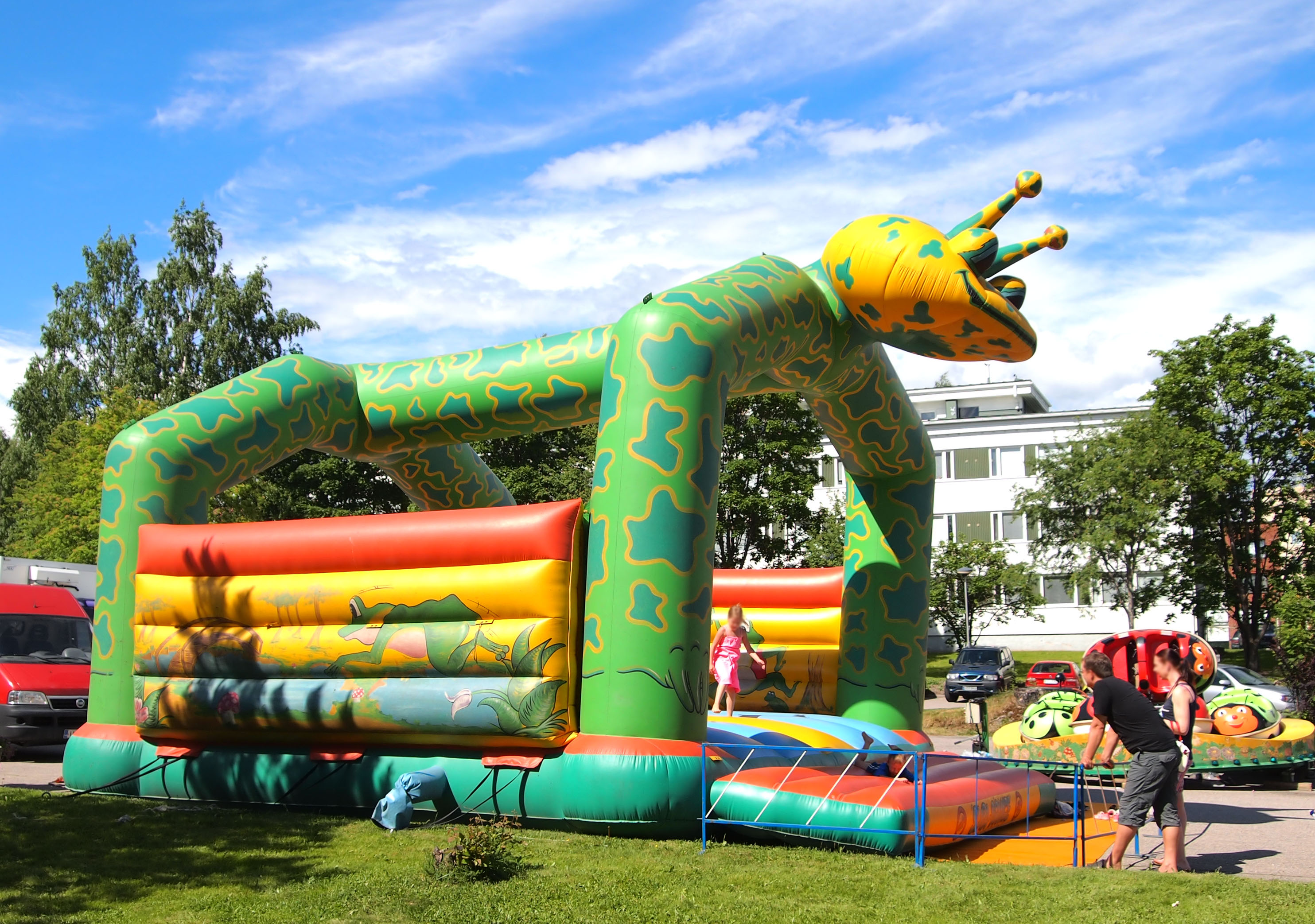
A typical inflatable castle during the fair in Muurame, Finland, in 2013

While bouncy castle manufacturers adhere to voluntary standards, no national safety standards exist in the U.S., although some states such as Pennsylvania and New Jersey require that inflatables pass engineering and safety standards before allowing the equipment to be rented out. In 2017, roughly 25 U.S. states had regulations governing permits, inspections and insurance, although a private investigation by the Pew Charitable Trust has shown significant shortcomings by industry operators and regulators to do their part. North Carolina requires amusements rides, including inflatables, to be inspected annually by the North Carolina Department of Labor (NCDOL). For inflatables to pass inspection, operators in North Carolina are required to have all training records, a current certificate of insurance, and device manuals. Inflatables that are damaged and not safe will not pass inspection until they are repaired. Within the Uk & Europe BSEN 14960 is the standard to which covers Inflatable Safety. It sets out requirements covering things such as design, manufacture, materials, structural safety, anchorage, access/egress, blower systems, labelling, operating instructions and inspection/testing.

== Inflatable obstacle courses ==
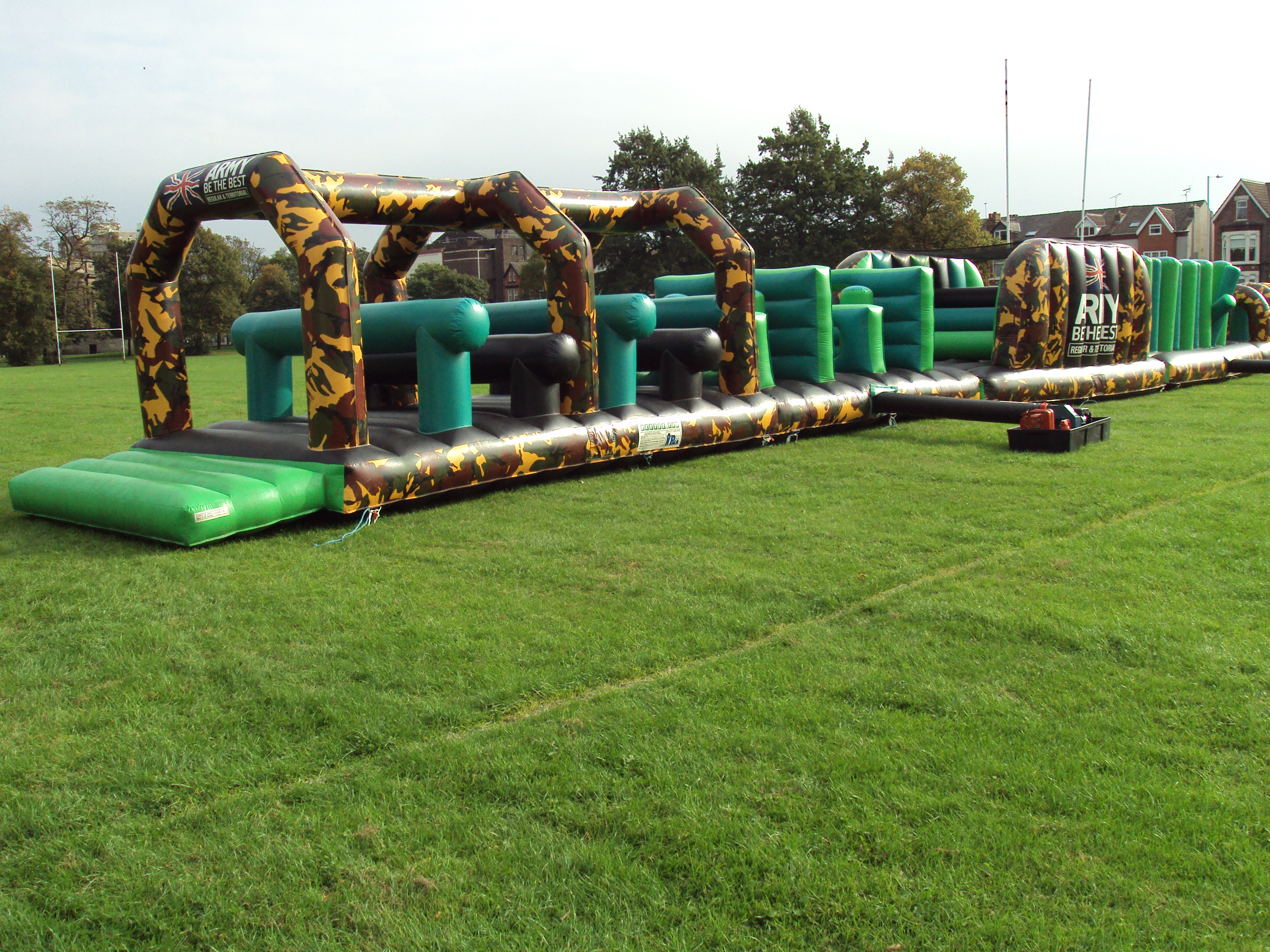
A child-sized inflatable obstacle course

There are also inflatable obstacle courses that allow for participants to have races and sword fights and compete against one another. These are commonly rectangular in shape, but they can also be square if the course is maze-like. Most obstacle courses have two lanes, but some can have three or four. They feature various such as pop-up obstacles, climbing areas, slides, and tunnels. These are the best choice for very large events since participants move through them quickly.

== Inflatable park ==
The phrase "inflatable park" or "Airparx" may refer to both a collection of portable inflatables set up temporarily as one attraction, or a permanent attraction consisting of inflatables.

== Games ==
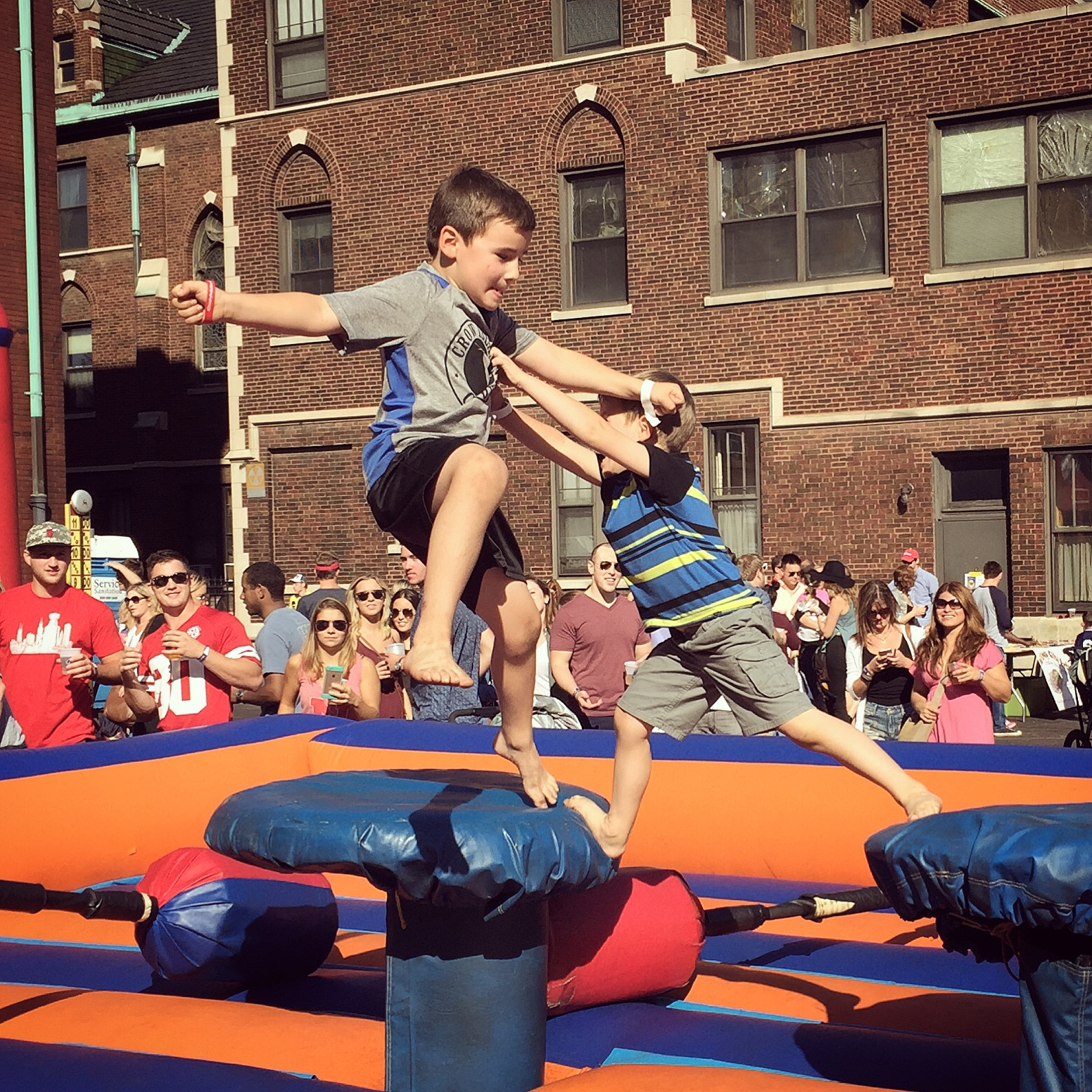
Children playing gladiator duel in a flat-layout inflatable castle

Some inflatables are designed to allow games such as boxing rings, water football, penalty shootouts, basketball, rumbling, tug of war, and gladiator duels. These interactive inflatable games are made out of the same material that a continuous airflow bounce house is made of. Quad tracks are also popular and provide the perimeter for quad bike racing.

== Safety ==
Injuries are common. According to Jim Barber, spokesman for the National Association of Amusement Ride Safety Officials, "It happens all the time. These are probably the most dangerous amusement devices they have. You see more injuries on inflatables than almost any other amusement ride you can think of – more than roller coasters." In 2010, "as many as 31 U.S. children per day were treated for injuries sustained in a bounce house, or one child every 46 minutes". An estimated 65,000 children under the age of 17 were injured from 1990 to 2010. In May 2001, the U.S. Consumer Product Safety Commission released a bulletin outlining the dangers and recommended safety precautions for operating an inflatable structure.

Injuries caused by inflatable rides were rising in the United States, according to a 2012 study published in the journal Pediatrics, which found a 15-fold increase from 1995 to 2010, a trend corroborated in the 2003–2012 period by a 2015 U.S. Consumer Product Safety Commission report. Frank Scurlock, son of inventor John Scurlock and manager of bouncy inflatable rental company Space Walk, ascribes the increase to rising non-commercial use of inexpensive retail "backyard" units, while bounce houses have also become more common overall. Although rising, the number of injuries related to inflatable amusements is small when compared to the more everyday hazards of playgrounds and skateboards, which respectively were linked to an estimated 270,000 and 114,000 injuries in 2012. In 2015, after studying the incidence of injury the commission released a revised bulletin for the recommended safety precautions for operating an inflatable device.

In a survey spanning 2003–2013, the most common injuries were fractures, strains, sprains, dislocations, contusions, abrasions, and lacerations. An estimated 88% of the injured were less than 15 years old. Most injuries occur due to falls or collisions with another child. Some severe fall injuries occur after wind lifts bouncy castles skyward.

The CPSC reiterated its warning in 2019.

An outbreak of "superbug" MRSA in Ireland in late 2025 resulted from bouncy castles.

=== Incidents ===
From 2000 to early 2016, there were 64 bounce house accidents worldwide caused by wind, resulting in 271 injuries and 10 deaths.

Some more notable incidents have included:

- In South Yorkshire in England a boy died in August 2003 while using one; he had climbed onto the wall and fell out of the structure head-first.
- A boy's parents sued the hirers of a jumping castle in 2005 after he was given brain damage when another boy somersaulted onto him. An appeal was lodged, and the verdict was overturned.
- An eight-year-old girl died in May 2011 after falling head first from a bouncy castle onto a concrete pavement.
- In July 2015 two children were killed and three seriously injured when a gust of wind lifted a bouncy castle over 60 feet off the ground in Tartu county, Estonia.
- A seven-year-old girl was killed in England on 27 March 2016 after a sudden gust of wind lifted an inflatable bounce house into the air and carried it nearly a mile away.
- A six-year-old boy died in 2016 in Montevideo (Uruguay) after the bouncy castle was deflated with the child still inside.
- A child died in Girona (Spain) on May 7, 2017.
- A girl was thrown 20ft in the air from a bouncy castle on Gorleston beach, Norfolk, UK, on 1 July 2018. She died of her injuries in hospital.
- In Carson City, Nevada during 2019, two children were injured and one was killed when their bouncy house was driven by wind into power lines.
- In December 2021, six children died and three others were critically injured in a jumping castle incident at the Hillcrest Primary School in Devonport, Tasmania, Australia. According to witnesses, the children fell from a height of about 10 metres (33 ft) after a large gust of wind blew the castle into the air. Jumping castles were banned from use by schools in Tasmania until further notice shortly after.
- Two girls, aged four and eight, were killed after a gust of wind lifted a jumping castle into the air in Mislata, Spain, on 4 January 2022. The eight-year-old died the following day whereas the four-year-old died one week after the event.
- A five year-old boy was killed in Waldorf, Maryland, in an inflatable bounce house in 2024.
- A seven year-old boy in Belgium was killed during a 2026 soccer tournament when the bounce castle he played in blew into a fence.

== See also ==
- List of inflatable manufactured goods
