= St. Rose Church (Cincinnati, Ohio) =

- St. Rosa Church
- U.S. National Register of Historic Places
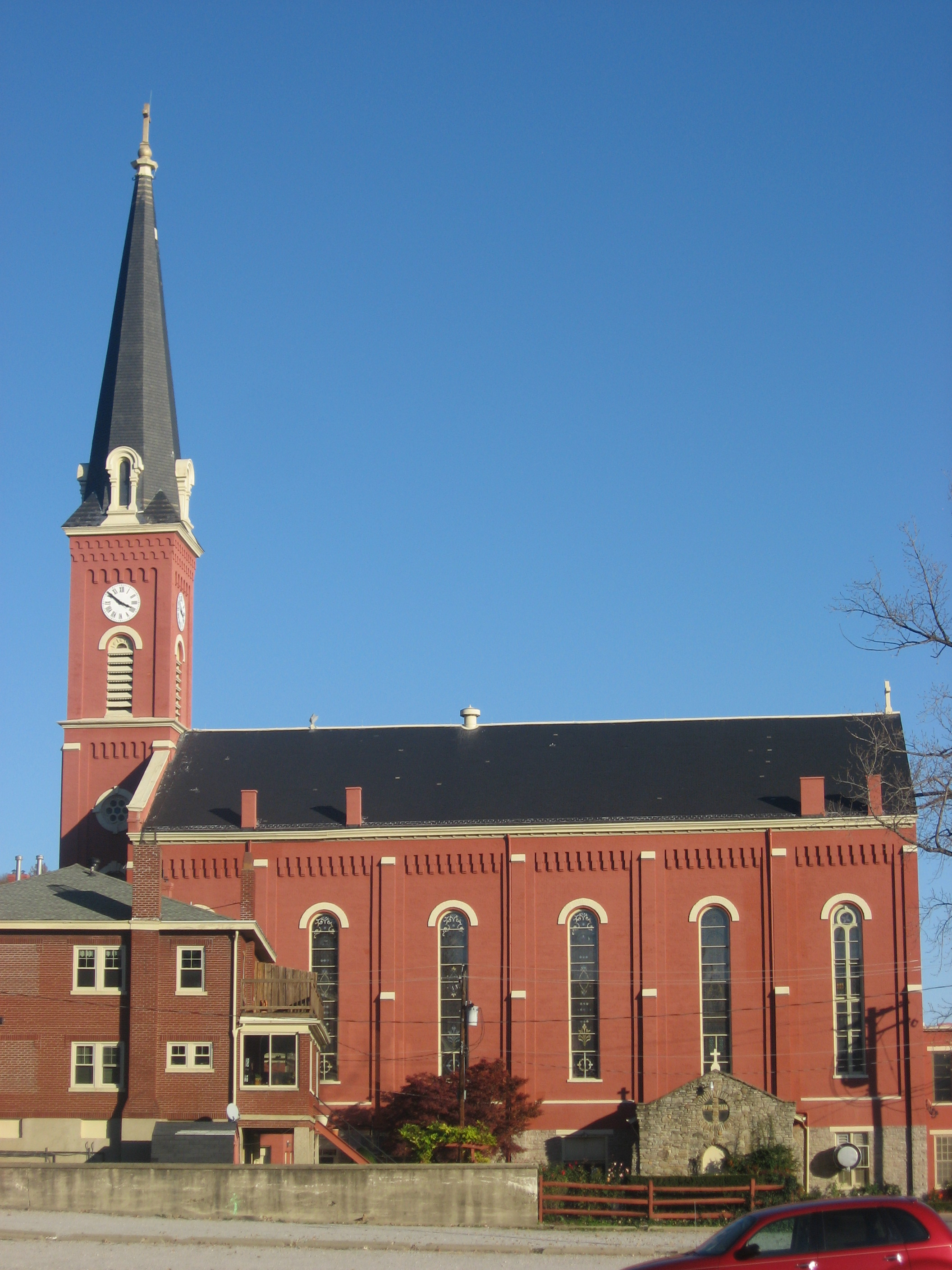
- Side of the church

- Location within Ohio Location within the United States
- Location: 2501 Eastern Ave., Cincinnati, Ohio
- Coordinates: 39°7′26″N 84°27′42″W
- Built: 1867
- Architectural style: Italianate, Romanesque
- NRHP reference No.: 82003587
- Added to NRHP: April 1, 1982

St. Rose (of Lima) Church, also known as St. Rosa Church, is a Roman Catholic church located in Cincinnati, Ohio's East End neighborhood at 2501 Riverside Drive (formerly Eastern Avenue). Located near the banks of the Ohio River, the church has endured many floods as evidenced by a high water mark painted on the rear side.

== History ==
The congregation organized January 15, 1867. The parish was named for St. Rose of Lima, the first saint from the Americas. The parent parishes were Saint Philomena and St. Francis de Sales. The congregation was mostly German.

The church was erected in 1867; the cornerstone was laid October 6, 1867. The dedication occurred May 21, 1869. The building is brick, with stone trimmings in the Roman style, measuring 57 by 127 feet (17 by 39 m). Its steeple, over 190 feet (58 m) high, is a landmark on the Ohio River. The cost, including lot, was over $60,000.

On January 31, 1894, the church and the school were almost entirely destroyed by fire — with only the walls remaining. The church was rebuilt at a cost of $30,000; every dollar was donated. The congregation numbered 200 families in 1896.

The parish remains active today.
