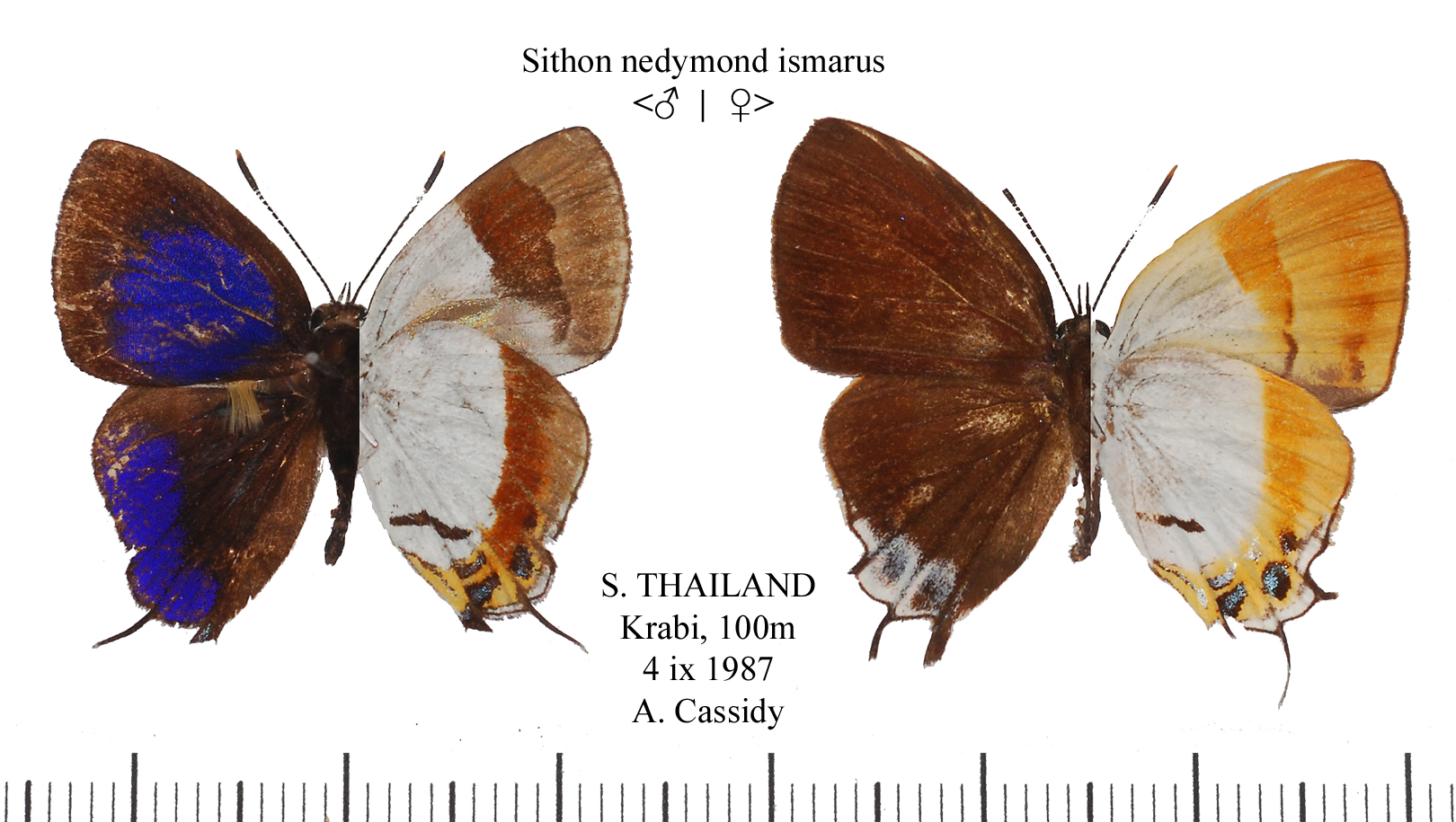

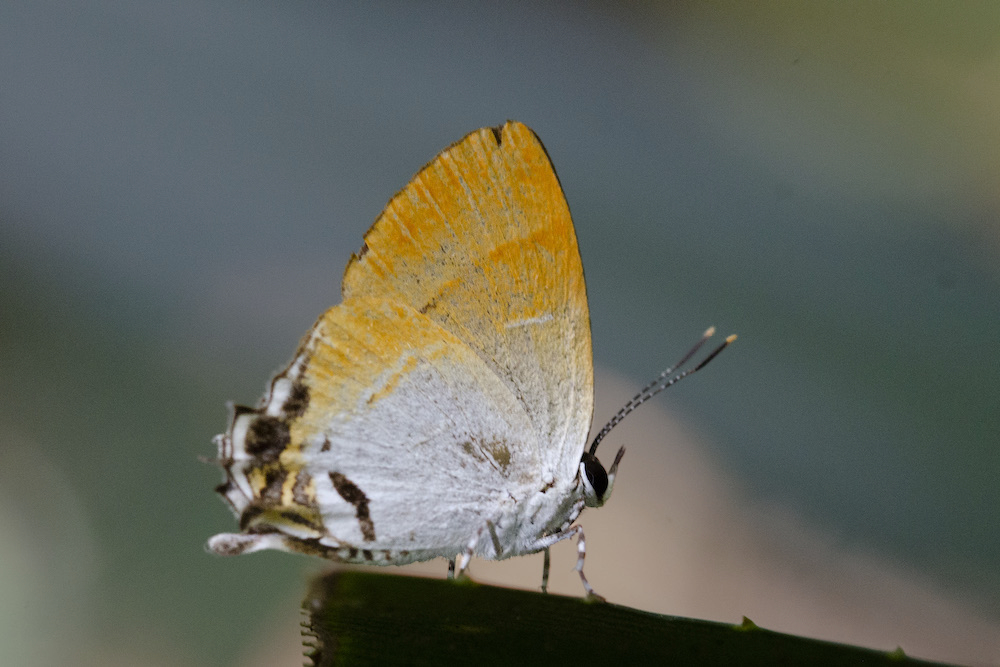

Scientific classification
- Kingdom: Animalia
- Phylum: Arthropoda
- Class: Insecta
- Order: Lepidoptera
- Family: Lycaenidae
- Genus: Sithon
- Species: S. nedymond

Binomial name
- Sithon nedymond (Fruhstorfer, [1912])

Synonyms
- Papilio nedymond Cramer, [1780]; Thecla chitra Horsfield, 1829; Sithon nedymond megabates Fruhstorfer, [1912]; Sithon nedymond anaximander Fruhstorfer, [1912]

= Sithon nedymond =

Species of butterfly

Sithon nedymond, the plush, is a butterfly in the family Lycaenidae. It was described by Hans Fruhstorfer in 1912. It is found in the Indomalayan realm.

== Subspecies ==
- Sithon nedymond nedymond (Sundaland)
- Sithon nedymond ismarus Fruhstorfer, 1912 (southern Burma, Langkawi, Thailand)
- Sithon nedymond mastanabal Fruhstorfer, 1912 (south-eastern Borneo)
- Sithon nedymond klossi Riley, 1945 (Mentawai Island)
