= Traumatic asphyxia =

- Specialty: Emergency medicine

Traumatic asphyxia, or Perte's syndrome, is a medical emergency caused by an intense compression of the thoracic cavity, causing venous back-flow from the right side of the heart into the veins of the neck and the brain.

== Signs and symptoms ==
Traumatic asphyxia is characterized by cyanosis in the upper extremities, neck, and head as well as petechiae in the conjunctiva. Patients can also display jugular venous distention and facial edema. Associated injuries include pulmonary contusion, myocardial contusion, hemo/pneumothorax, and broken ribs.

== Causes ==
Traumatic asphyxia occurs when a powerful compressive force is applied to the thoracic cavity. This is most often seen in motor vehicle accidents, as well as industrial and farming accidents. However, it can be present anytime a significant pressure is applied to the thorax.

== Pathophysiology ==
The sudden impact on the thorax causes an increase in intrathoracic pressure. In order for traumatic asphyxia to occur, a Valsalva maneuver is required when the traumatic force is applied. Exhalation against the closed glottis along with the traumatic event causes air that cannot escape from the thoracic cavity. Instead, the air causes increased venous back-pressure, which is transferred back to the heart through the right atrium, to the superior vena cava and to the head and neck veins and capillaries.

== Diagnosis ==
Patients are seen with a cyanotic discoloration of the shoulder skin and neck and face, jugular distention, bulging of the eyeballs, and swelling of the tongue and lips. The latter two are resultants of edema, caused by excessive blood accumulating in the veins of the head and neck and venous stasis.

== Prognosis ==
For individuals who survive the initial crush injury, survival rates are high for traumatic asphyxia.

== See also ==
- Asphyxia
- Crush syndrome
- Flail chest
- Tension pneumothorax
- Traumatic aortic rupture
