= List of unusual deaths in the 20th century =

Lists of unusual deaths
Antiquity	Middle Ages	Renaissance	Early modern period
19th century	20th century	21st century	Animal deaths

This list of unusual deaths includes unique or extremely rare circumstances of death recorded throughout the 20th century, noted as being unusual by multiple sources.

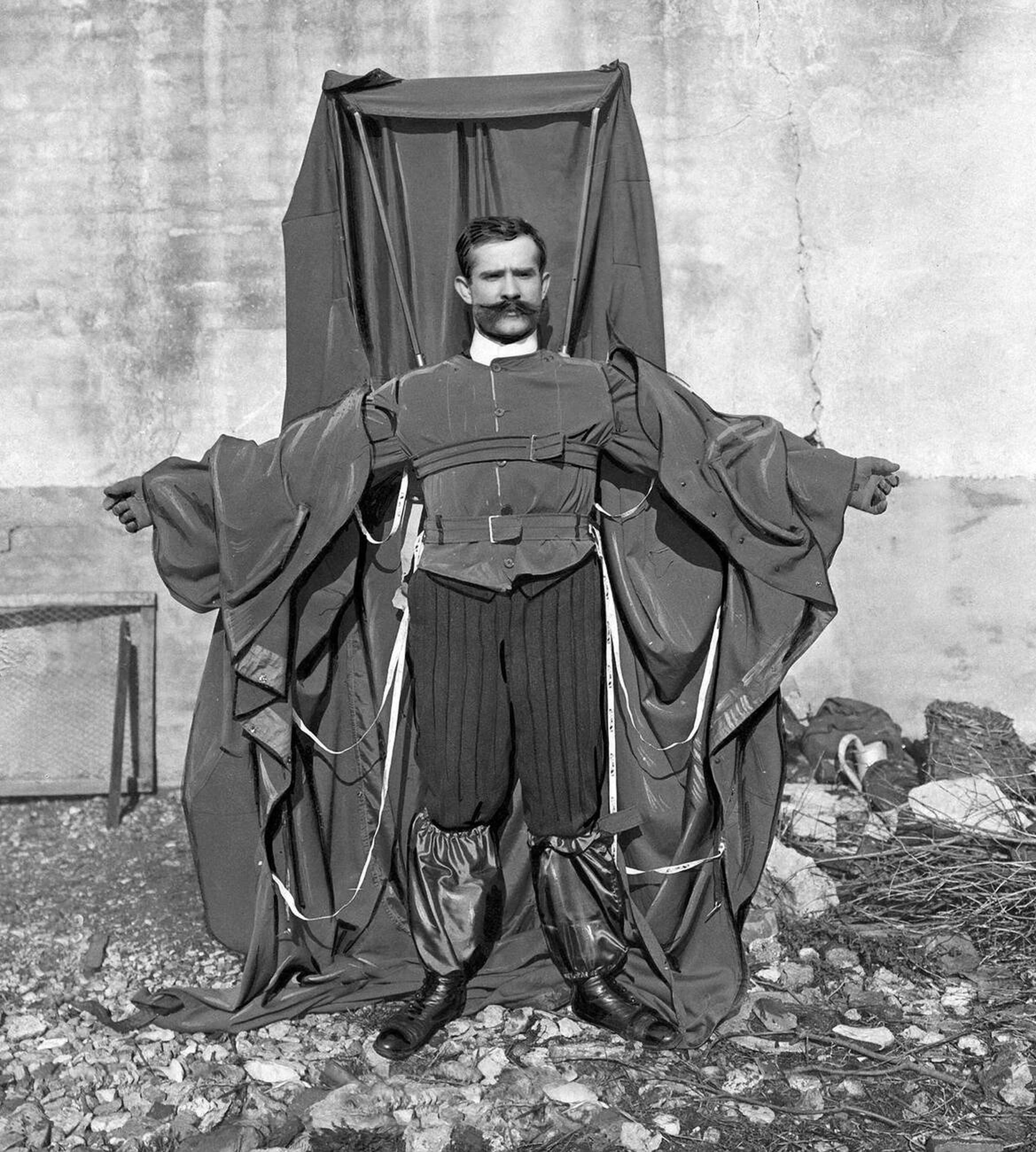
Franz Reichelt, known as the "Flying Tailor", prior to his death testing an early wingsuit

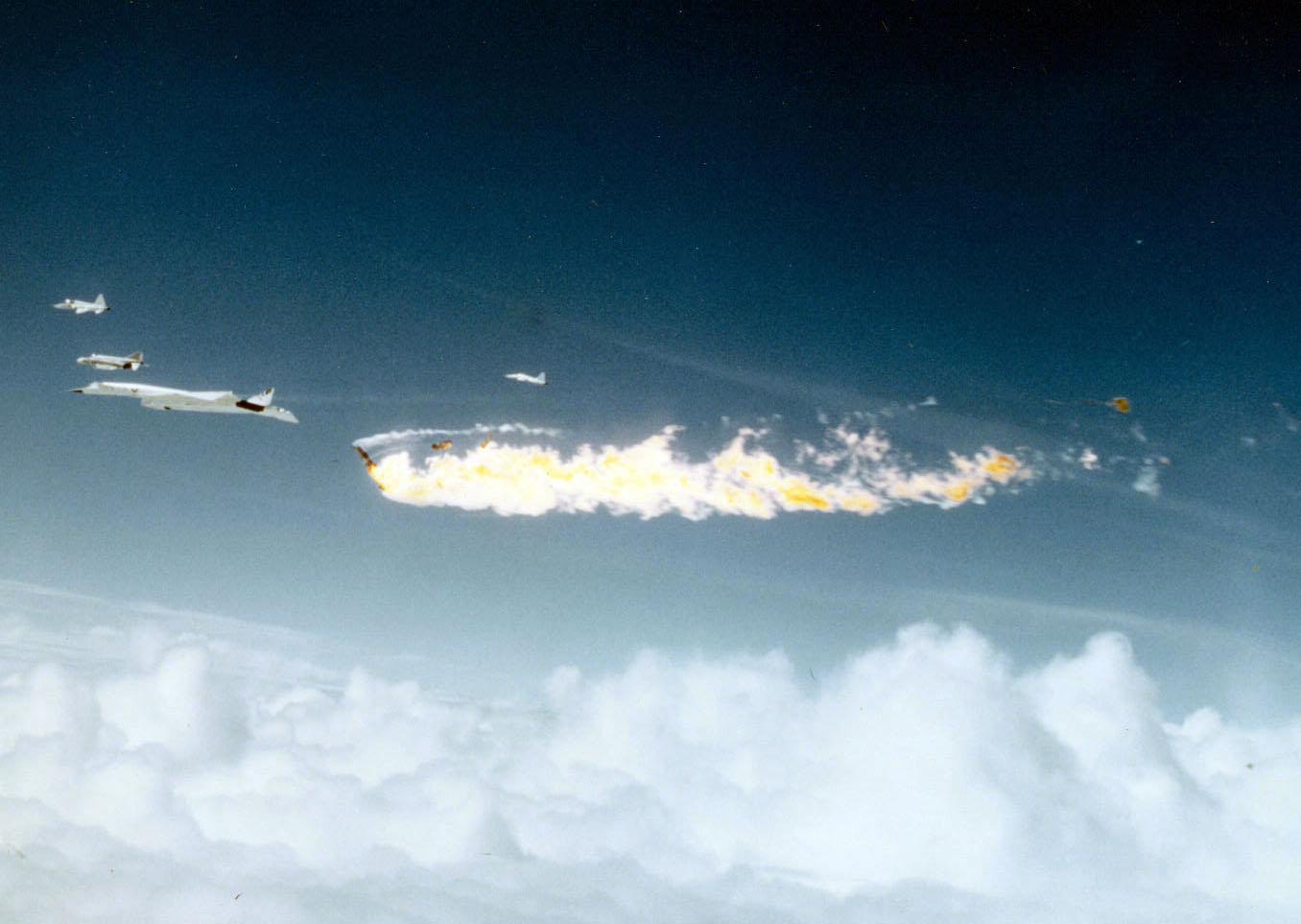
The 1966 mid-air collision that killed astronaut Joseph A. Walker and test pilot Carl Cross

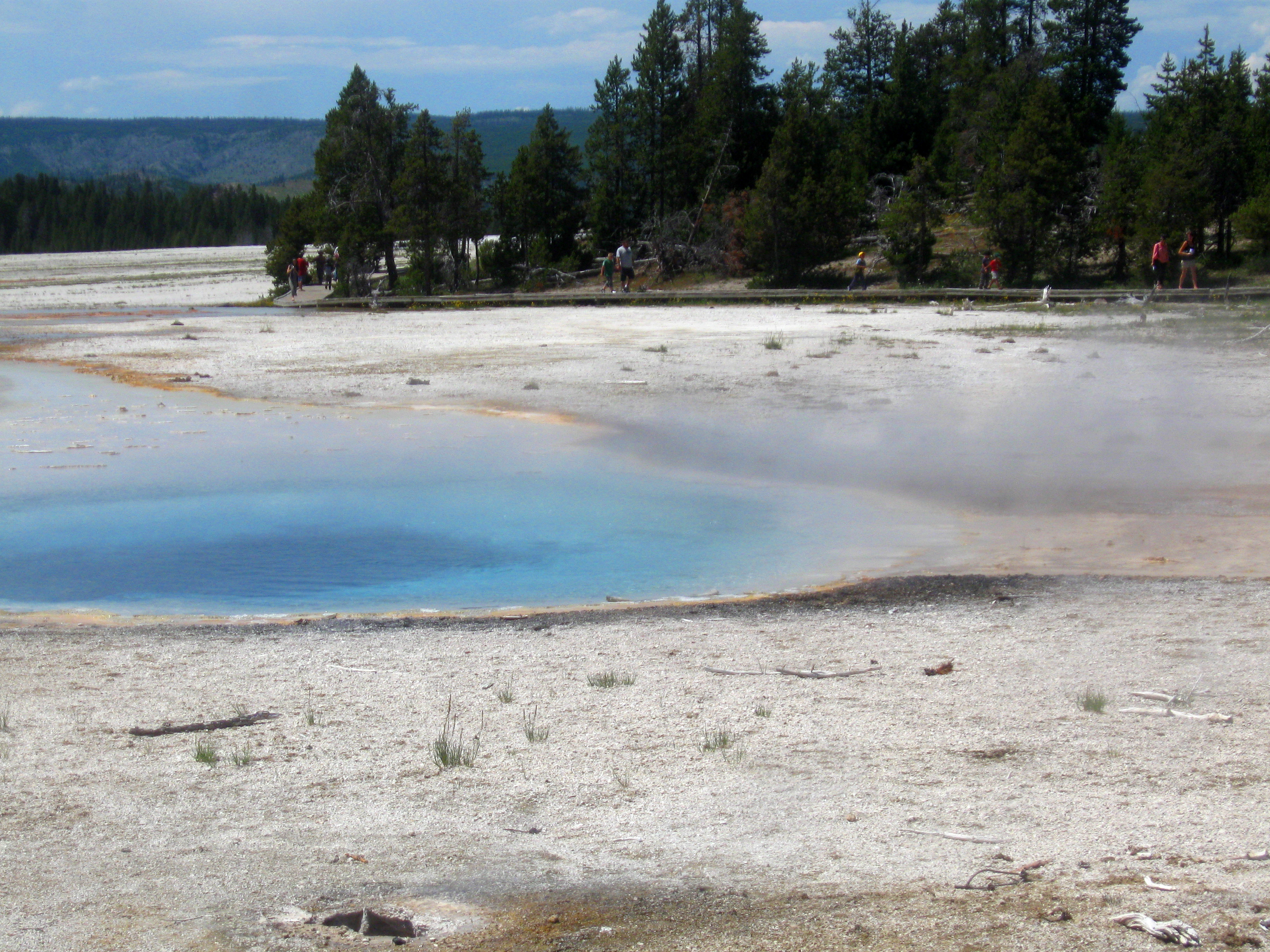
Celestine Pool in Yellowstone National Park, scene of the death of David Alan Kirwan

== 1900s ==
Name of person	Image	Date of death	Country	Details
Victims of the 1900 English beer poisoning		1900	England	In the English Midlands and North West England, over 6,000 were poisoned and 70 people died after drinking beer which used non-purified sulfuric acid laced with arsenic as an ingredient. Most survivors were paralysed.
Jesse William Lazear		25 September 1900	Cuba	The 34-year-old American physician was convinced that mosquitoes were carriers for yellow fever. He allowed himself to be bitten by multiple mosquitoes and died days later from the disease.
Victims of the Thanksgiving Day Disaster		29 November 1900	United States	During the 1900 Big Game between the California Golden Bears and the Stanford Cardinal American football teams, a large crowd of people who did not want to pay the $1 (equivalent to $39 in 2025) admission fee gathered upon the roof of a glass blowing factory to watch for free. The roof then collapsed, severing fuel pipes and causing at least 100 people to fall four stories to the factory floor. 60 to 100 more people fell directly on top of a furnace, the surface temperature of which was estimated to be around 500 °F (260 °C). 23 people were killed, and over 100 more were injured. The disaster remains the deadliest accident at a sporting event in U.S. history.
James Doyle Jr.		30 January 1901	United States	The lineworker in Smartsville, California, was killed by an electric shock through a telephone receiver after a broken power line came in contact with the telephone wire.
R. Stanton Walker		25 October 1902	United States	The 20-year-old was watching an amateur baseball game in Morristown, Ohio when a foul ball struck him in the hand, driving a knife he was passing to one of his friends into his chest. His friends asked if he was hurt and he said "not much", but the wound soon began to bleed heavily and he died within minutes.
Ed Delahanty		2 July 1903	Canada	The 35-year-old American baseball player for the Washington Senators died after being removed from a train due to drunken horseplay, falling off International Bridge above Niagara Falls. Sam Kingston, a local night watchman, was the last to see him alive, reportedly scuffling with him. Kingston's account of the incident was spotty and inconsistent; it is unclear whether Delahanty was intentionally pushed, accidentally fell, or decided to jump.
Mary Ellen Rumble		19 December 1905	Australia	The daughter of a farmer in Watervale near Murrumburrah in New South Wales was killed when one of a group of horses attempting to escape from a paddock knocked her down, causing her neck to snap.
Archibald Anderson		4 March 1907	Australia	The 19-year-old was bathing in the Yarra River when a tooth plate fell out and got lodged in his throat, choking him to death.
Thomas Selfridge		17 September 1908	United States	Thomas Selfridge and Orville Wright were presenting the 1908 Wright Military Flyer to the US Army Signal Corps Division at Fort Myer. The plane made 4^{1}/_{2} rounds around the Fort before running into problems and crashing. Selfridge fractured his skull and died three hours later, becoming the first person to die in the crash of a powered aircraft.
Dietrich von Hülsen-Haeseler		14 November 1908	German Empire	The Chief of the German Imperial Military Cabinet suffered a heart attack and died aged 56 after giving a ballet performance, crossdressing in a tutu, to Kaiser Wilhelm II and other members of a hunting party staying at Donaueschingen Palace. Shortly after ending his recital with a bow, he collapsed and was pronounced dead at the scene. The circumstances of his death were covered up by military officials so as not to further inflame public outrage over the Eulenburg affair, a government scandal dealing with accusations of homosexual behavior against members of the Kaiser's cabinet and entourage.
George Spencer Millet	A black-and-white photograph of George Millet.	15 February 1909	United States	The American teenager who worked as an office boy at an insurance company at the Metropolitan Life Building in New York City, was fleeing six young women stenographers at his workplace intent on giving him kisses for his 15th birthday while carrying a metal ink eraser in his breast pocket. As the women moved in for their kisses, he fell forward, and the eraser's point pierced his heart, killing him.
Doc Powers		26 April 1909	United States	The 38-year-old American Major League Baseball player ran into a wall while chasing a foul ball during a Boston Red Sox-Philadelphia Athletics game at Philadelphia's Shibe Park, on 12 April 1909. He died from internal injuries and gangrene two weeks later.

== 1910s ==
Name of person	Image	Date of death	Country	Details
Ada Gregory		3 June 1910	Australia	The 52-year-old widow in Bentleigh, Victoria, who had been suffering from "fits of melancholia", began convulsing after rubbing powder on her teeth and asking her two children to take some medicine, which they did not do. She was believed to have taken strychnine.
Sigmund Neuberger		9 May 1911	Scotland	The 40-year-old German magician, better known as "The Great Lafayette", was so devastated by the death of his pet dog Beauty that he arranged burial for her with the Edinburgh City Council at Piershill Cemetery, under the condition that he would also be buried next to her when he died. Lafayette reportedly proclaimed that he would not live much longer after Beauty's death. Four days later, he was performing at the Empire Palace Theatre in Edinburgh, Scotland, when a fire broke out and engulfed the stage within minutes. The audience, thinking that this was all part of the illusion, did not evacuate until the theatre manager signaled for the orchestra to play God Save the King. Two days after the fire, Lafayette's body double was misidentified as Lafayette himself until his real body was identified a day later and was buried per his wishes. Other than Lafayette, ten other people also died in the disaster.
Franz Reichelt		4 February 1912	France	The 33-year-old tailor and inventor leaped from the Eiffel Tower wearing a parachute made from cloth, his own invention, and fell 57 metres (187 ft) to his death. He was asked by friends and authorities to use a dummy for the feat, but declined, saying "I intend to prove the worth of my invention". His impact crater was 15 centimetres (5.9 in) deep.
Mr. & Mrs. Emile Froment-Meurice		25 April 1913	France	The famed French goldsmith and his wife were killed when their house, in an aristocratic quarter of Paris, collapsed on them.
Emily Davison		8 June 1913	England	On 4 June 1913, the 40-year-old suffragette from London was mortally injured at the Epsom Derby when she ran onto the racetrack wearing a suffragette flag and was run over by Anmer, George V's horse, which jockey Herbert Jones was riding. She suffered a fractured skull, a concussion, and internal injuries and died in the Epsom Cottage Hospital 4 days later.
Victims of the Jersey Shore shark attacks of 1916		July 1916	United States	Between 1 and 12 July 1916, four people were killed and one critically injured by a shark attack at Jersey Shore, New Jersey. Before 1916, American scholars and scientific community doubted that sharks would fatally wound a living person in the temperate waters of the northeastern United States without provocation. The attack led to a wave of panic that led to shark hunts aimed at eradicating the population of "man-eating" sharks, and entered into American popular culture, serving as an inspiration of the novel Jaws and its film adaptation.
Grigori Rasputin		30 December [O.S. 17 December] 1916	Russian Empire	The 47-year-old Russian mystic died of three gunshot wounds, one of which was a close-range shot to his forehead. Little is certain about his death beyond this, and the circumstances of his death have been the subject of considerable speculation. According to his murderer himself, Prince Felix Yusupov, Grigori Rasputin consumed tea, cakes, and wine which had been laced with cyanide but he did not appear to be affected by it. He was then shot once in the chest and believed to be dead but, after a while, he leapt up and attacked Yusupov, who freed himself and fled. Rasputin followed and made it into the courtyard before being shot again, and collapsing into a snowbank. The conspirators then wrapped his body and dropped it into the Malaya Nevka River.
Gustav Kobbé		27 July 1918	United States	The 61-year-old author and music critic was sailing in Great South Bay, New York, when he noticed a low-flying seaplane heading toward him. Kobbé attempted to get into the water, but the plane crashed into the mast of Kobbé's boat, splitting his head open.
Victims of the Great Molasses Flood		15 January 1919	United States	21 people were killed and 150 injured after a large tank of molasses burst in Boston's North End.

== 1920s ==
Name of person	Image	Date of death	Country	Details
Ivy Taylor		4 August 1920	England	The 12-year-old girl from Blackburn, Lancashire, died from ulceration of air passages after ingesting sodium silicate jelly inside a golf ball.
Ray Chapman		17 August 1920	United States	On 16 August 1920, while he was up to bat, the 29-year-old Cleveland Indians baseball player was struck in the head by a pitch thrown by the New York Yankees' Carl Mays and died 12 hours later.
Alexander of Greece		25 October 1920	Greece	The 27-year-old Greek king died of sepsis after being bitten by a palace steward's pet Barbary macaque in his garden, while trying to break up a fight between his German shepherd and another monkey.
Thomas Lynn Bradford		5 February 1921	United States	In an attempt to ascertain the existence of an afterlife, the 48-year-old spiritualist committed suicide by inert gas asphyxiation. Two spiritualists later claimed to have talked with his ghost.
Michael F. Farley		8 October 1921	United States	The 58-year-old U.S. Representative and Gore–McLemore resolution supporter died of anthrax he contracted from his shaving brush.
Mrs. W. C. (Elizabeth) Eckersley		25 November 1922	Australia	The woman from Glen Innes, New South Wales, was found drowned in a cask of water. It was surmised that she was leaning over the cask when she suddenly fainted and fell into it.
Frank Hayes	Portrait of Frank Hayes	4 June 1923	United States	The 22-year-old Irish jockey died of a heart attack mid-race in Elmont, New York, and collapsed on the horse, which nonetheless crossed the finish line first, still carrying his body.
Martha Mansfield		30 November 1923	United States	While the 24-year-old American film actress was on location in San Antonio, Texas filming the American Civil War drama The Warrens of Virginia, a lit match was carelessly tossed by a crew member, which ignited the hoop skirts and ruffles of her Civil War costume. Co-star Wilfred Lytell and a chauffeur were able to extinguish the flames and rush her to a hospital, where she died the following day from her injuries.
Mr. and Mrs. Earl J. Dunn		13 July 1924	United States	While attempting to turn around at Grand View in Yellowstone National Park, the Dunns somehow backed their car over a cliff, despite a tree barrier that would normally have made this impossible. The vehicle fell 800 feet (240 m) and then rolled another 200 feet (61 m).
Thornton Jones		1 August 1924	Wales	The lawyer from Bangor, Gwynedd, slit his own throat while he was having a nightmare. An inquest at Bangor delivered a verdict of "suicide while temporarily insane".
Cora Stallman		1 August 1925	United States	The 45-year-old schoolteacher from Cincinnati, Ohio, was found dead in a cistern in Coles County, Illinois, and was confirmed to be poisoned by a "strange man".
Phillip McClean		April 1926	Australia	The 16-year-old and his brother were clubbing a cassowary on the family property in Mossman, Queensland, when it attacked Phillip and knocked him to the ground. The bird's claws punctured his jugular vein, and he died of blood loss before help could be summoned.
Bobby Leach		26 April 1926	New Zealand	The American stunt performer died after a botched amputation of the infected leg which he had broken after slipping on an orange peel. He had gone over Niagara Falls in a barrel 15 years earlier.
Harry Houdini		31 October 1926	United States	The 52-year-old Hungarian-American escape artist, illusionist, and stunt performer reportedly died from a punch from college student J. Gordon Whitehead, which gave him "peritonitis, caused by a ruptured appendix." However, other stories claim he was murdered. Who or what killed Houdini is still under speculation.
Isadora Duncan		14 September 1927	France	The 50-year-old American dancer broke her neck in Nice, when her long scarf became entangled in the open-spoked wheel and rear axle of the Amilcar CGSS automobile in which she was riding.
Alexander Bogdanov		7 April 1928	Soviet Union	The 54-year-old Soviet polymath and pioneer of blood transfusion died after exchanging his blood with his student who suffered from malaria and tuberculosis, presumably due to hemolytic transfusion reaction. Bogdanov's hypotheses were that the younger man's blood would rejuvenate his own aging body, and that his own blood, which he believed was resistant to tuberculosis, would treat the student's disease. The student injected with his blood made a complete recovery.
Alfred Loewenstein		4 July 1928	N/A	The 51-year-old financier and third-richest man in the world at the time, died while flying from England to Belgium on his private Fokker F.VII airplane. It is believed he fell out of the aircraft and into the water where he died.
Victims of the Gillingham Fair fire disaster		11 July 1929	England	In Gillingham, Kent, an annual firefighting demonstration involving a rescue operation inside a three-storey dummy house was hosted at a fair in Gillingham park. The real fire was accidentally lit after the six men and nine boys aged between 10 and 14 were ready to enact their staged rescue. The canvas-clad wooden structure was quickly engulfed in flames, trapping the occupants inside. The crowd reportedly cheered and applauded for what they believed to be realistic and spectacular effects until they witnessed two boys with their clothing ablaze jump to their deaths from the top of the structure. The fire resulted in the deaths of 15 people.

== 1930s ==
Name of person	Image	Date of death	Country	Details
William Kogut		20 October 1930	United States	The 26-year-old convicted murderer, a death row inmate at San Quentin in California, reportedly committed suicide using a pipe bomb he made with playing cards and a hollow steel leg from his cot. (Note: Snopes rates this account of Kogut's death as a "Legend".)
Arnold Bennett		27 March 1931	England (Note: While the incident that resulted in Bennett's death happened in France, he ultimately died after returning to England.)	The 63-year-old British novelist was dining in Paris with his partner, Dorothy Cheston Bennett. He drank two glasses of tap water during the meal, scoffing at Dorothy's claims that the water in Paris was not properly treated to be safe to drink. Within two days, he contracted typhoid fever and died two months later.
James Leo McDermott		26 August 1931	United States	After the 40-year-old deputy sheriff stepped out of his car at an oil station, the vehicle began to roll forward, and he attempted to hop onto the car's running board to stop it. It carried him forward and slammed him into a hook used to hold air and water hoses, which impaled him just below the heart.
Eben Byers		31 March 1932	United States	The 51-year-old American socialite and industrialist died after drinking excessive quantities of Radithor, a patent medicine that contained 2 microcuries of radium. He drank a total of around 1400 doses, which concentrated in his bones, continually irradiating him. By 1931, his bones were reportedly disintegrating and his jaw had been removed; he died the next year.
Michael Malloy		22 February 1933	United States	Five people, called the "Murder Trust," planned to kill Malloy for life insurance. Over the course of two months, they added antifreeze, turpentine, horse liniment, and finally rat poison in his alcohol, but Malloy drank it with no problems whatsoever. They then tried feeding him wood alcohol, expired oysters, and then a sandwich made of expired sardines and shrapnel, none of which had the desired effect. The group then tried to freeze him to death, and when that failed they ran him over twice with a taxi, from which Malloy recovered. Finally, they connected a hose to a coal gas jet and placed it in his mouth, which caused his death from carbon monoxide poisoning. Malloy was given nicknames such as "Mike the Durable", "Iron Mike", and "The Irish Rasputin".
Susan Grace Kelly		16 January 1935	Australia	The 80-year-old woman in Armidale, New South Wales, was sitting with her daughter when she fell back dead after hearing a loud clap of thunder. Her last words were, "That was very close."
Catherine Steyer		20 January 1937	United States	The 33-year-old hatcheck girl was accidentally electrocuted by a homemade booby trap, consisting of powered wires hidden within drapes, that her fiance had installed after her apartment was broken into a few months prior. Falling onto one wire, with another dangling above her arm, she completed the circuit each time the dangling wire touched her; she died slowly from the repeating doses of electricity.
Fred Clapp		28 May 1937	United States	The 77-year-old farmer from Clark County, South Dakota, died after being dragged by a bundle of horses while being tied to the harness.
Benjamin Taylor		2 June 1937	United States	During a carbuncle removal operation, an electric cautery ignited gases from the patient's lungs. This caused an explosion which killed Taylor and injured two nurses.
Harold Davidson		30 July 1937	England	The 62-year-old defrocked Anglican vicar died while re-enacting the story of Daniel in the Lions' Den at a sideshow in Skegness, by entering a cage containing two lions, which then mauled and fatally injured him; his death may have also been contributed to by being accidentally poisoned with insulin by a doctor who wrongly believed Davidson to be a diabetic.
Nicholas Comper		17 June 1939	England	The 42-year-old aviator and aircraft designer was attempting to light a firework in Hythe, Kent, when a passerby enquired what he was doing; he replied sarcastically that he was an IRA man planning to blow up the town hall. The passerby responded by knocking down Comper, who hit his head on the curb.

== 1940s ==
Name of person	Image	Date of death	Country	Details
Italo Balbo		28 June 1940	Libya	The 44-year-old governor of Italian Libya and marshal of the Regia Aeronautica was flying his personal Savoia-Marchetti SM.79 when the Libyan airfield at Tobruk was attacked by a squad of British planes. He was killed by friendly fire from Italian anti-aircraft batteries on the ground.
Leon Trotsky		21 August 1940	Mexico	The 60-year-old Russian socialist and revolutionary was murdered in his villa in Mexico by Spanish-born NKVD agent Ramón Mercader with an ice axe.
Sherwood Anderson		8 March 1941	Panama	The 64-year-old American writer died of peritonitis after accidentally swallowing an olive that had a toothpick inside.
Jack Budlong		5 August 1941	United States	The friend of Errol Flynn was working as an extra on the film They Died with Their Boots On, starring Flynn and Olivia de Havilland. Budlong insisted on using a real saber rather than a prop one. While filming a cavalry charge, Budlong's horse was frightened by the sounds of simulated explosions and threw Budlong, causing him to impale himself with the sword.
Rolf Mützelburg		11 September 1942	N/A	The 29-year-old commander of German submarine U-203 died during a World War II patrol southwest of the Azores when he dived from the sub's conning tower to swim in the ocean. The boat lurched suddenly, and Mützelburg's head and shoulder struck the sub.
Maj. Kenneth D. McCullar		12 April 1943	Territory of Papua	The 27-year-old member of the 64th Bombardment Squadron was taking off for a night mission in New Guinea when he struck a wallaby with his bomber, initially referred to in reports as a "brush kangaroo" or "baby kangaroo". The bomber crashed on takeoff, which detonated its load of bombs, killing McCullar and the rest of the bomber's crew.
Victims of the Balvano train disaster		3 March 1944	Italy	At around midnight on 3 March 1944, a freight train headed from Naples to Potenza came to a stop inside the Armi tunnel in the town of Balvano due to its inability to climb over an incline. Due to a combination of carbon monoxide produced by poor-quality coal used on the locomotives and the lack of ventilation inside the tunnel, at least 517 people (most of whom were stowaway passengers) died as a result of carbon monoxide poisoning. The disaster remains the deadliest train accident in Italian history.
Thomas Midgley Jr.		2 November 1944	United States	The 55-year-old American chemical engineer, best known for inventing leaded gasoline and chlorofluorocarbon gas, contracted polio in 1941, which left him severely disabled, leading him to devise an elaborate system of ropes and pulleys to lift himself out of bed. In 1944, he became entangled in the device and died of strangulation.
Lothar Sieber		1 March 1945	Germany	The 22-year-old Luftwaffe test pilot died while making the only manned test flight of the Bachem Ba 349 Natter vertical take-off bomber. On his fatal flight, Sieber became the first human to fly a vertically-launched rocket.
Victims of the sinking of the USS Indianapolis (CA-35)		30 July 1945	N/A	After completing the classified mission of delivering a component for the Little Boy atomic bomb, the American heavy cruiser was sunk by the Imperial Japanese Navy submarine I-58. Of 1,195 crewmen aboard, about 300 went down with the ship. The remaining 890 faced hypothermia, dehydration, saltwater poisoning, and shark attacks while stranded in the open ocean for four days, with few lifeboats and almost no food or water. Only 316 survived the sinking; no U.S. warship sunk at sea has lost more sailors.
Louis Slotin		30 May 1946	United States	The 35-year-old Canadian physicist and Manhattan Project scientist died as the result of an accident while performing an experiment called "tickling the dragon's tail". Slotin used a screwdriver to separate two half sphere-shaped neutron deflectors enclosing a plutonium core which came to be known as the "demon core" to observe how much he can deflect the neutron without the core going over its critical mass. His screwdriver slipped, causing the top deflector to fully encase the core, resulting into a criticality accident that exposed him to a fatal dose of radiation. Slotin died 9 days later; the other people in the room observing the experiment survived.
Thomas Mantell		7 January 1948	United States	The 25-year-old P-51 Mustang fighter pilot crashed while in pursuit of an unidentified flying object near Franklin, Kentucky, thus becoming the first person known to have died as a result of a UFO sighting. Officially, the object remains unidentified, though the most likely explanation is that it was a U.S. Navy Skyhook balloon.

== 1950s ==
Name of person	Image	Date of death	Country	Details
Mary Reeser		2 July 1951	United States	The 67-year-old woman was found by police in her St. Petersburg, Florida, home almost totally cremated where she sat, while her apartment was relatively damage-free. Some speculate that she spontaneously combusted.
Margaret Wise Brown		13 November 1952	France	The 42-year-old American author of Goodnight Moon was hospitalized, either for an inflamed appendix or for an ovarian cyst. To prove how healthy she was after treatment, she kicked her foot in the air, dislodging a blood clot in her leg. The blood clot quickly travelled to her brain, and she died in emergency surgery.
Victims of the Dyatlov Pass incident	Dyatlov Pass incident 02	2 February 1959	Soviet Union	Nine experienced hikers died under unexplained circumstances on a ski trek across the Northern Urals. Their inadequately dressed bodies were found on the slopes of Kholat Syakhl mountain about 1.5 km (0.93 mi) away from their tent, which was cut open from the inside and abandoned along with equipment and supplies. The official investigation found no evidence of foul play and determined that six of the hikers died from hypothermia, while the other three sustained fatal physical trauma. Inexplicable injuries, traces of radiation on victims' clothing, and reports of bright burning objects in the sky have led to much speculation about the exact nature of the incident.

== 1960s ==
Name of person	Image	Date of death	Country	Details
Alan Stacey		19 June 1960	Belgium	The 26-year-old British racing driver died in a crash during the 1960 Belgian Grand Prix when a bird struck him in the face. Twenty-two-year-old British driver Chris Bristow was killed during the same race, five laps before Stacey and on the same extended fast right-hand bend.
John A. Byrnes, Richard Leroy McKinley, and Richard C. Legg		3 January 1961	United States	During the testing of an experimental nuclear reactor design, in Arco, Idaho, two soldiers and a sailor were killed, but their deaths were not due to radiation poisoning. While trying to bring the reactor online, Byrnes, an army specialist, was supposed to pull a control rod partway out by hand, but he pulled the rod further than intended. The reactor instantly went prompt critical, which flash-boiled the water around the reactor. The force of the steam expanding lifted the entire reactor into the air about 2.77 metres (9 ft 1 in), in what has been described as a water hammer-like effect. Many components were thrown out of the top, one of which impaled Legg, a navy electrician's mate, lifted him from a catwalk, and penetrated the ceiling, leaving him dangling. While the reactor was airborne the radioactive steam escaped, spraying the room. The steam was so hot that Byrnes instantly died of severe thermal burns. McKinley suffered a head wound, from which he died later that day. The steam left the bodies of all three men radioactive, so they were buried in lead-lined coffins. The three remain the only human beings killed by a reactor explosion in the United States.
Victor Prather		4 May 1961	N/A	The 34-year-old U.S. Navy flight surgeon drowned at the end of the record-setting Strato-Lab V balloon flight when he slipped from the rescue sling during recovery operations in the Gulf of Mexico and his pressure suit filled with water.
Giulio Cabianca and 3 others		15 June 1961	Italy	The 38-year-old Italian racing driver died in a bizarre series of events at the Modena Autodrome after a gearbox failure; unable to stop, Cabianca went off track, struck a spectator and then went through the gate of the Autodrome which was open because of men at work near the track. The car crossed the Via Emilia, collided with several vehicles, then crashed against the wall of a coachbuilder shop. Cabianca was killed, as were three others on the road.
Lee Harvey Oswald		24 November 1963	United States	The 24-year old assassin of President John F. Kennedy was being led through the basement of the Dallas Police Headquarters to be transferred to the county jail when he was shot at point-blank range by local nightclub owner Jack Ruby. The entire incident was filmed and broadcast live by NBC, making it the first death and first murder to occur on a live television broadcast.
Hedviga Golik		1966	Yugoslavia	The 42-year-old woman died of unknown natural causes inside her locked apartment whilst watching TV. Her untouched self-mummified body would go on to be discovered 42 years later on 12 May 2008.
Joseph A. Walker and Carl Cross		8 June 1966	United States	Astronaut and NASA test pilot Walker, flying a Lockheed F-104N Starfighter, and North American Aviation test pilot Cross, co-piloting a North American XB-70 Valkyrie bomber, were killed in a mid-air collision during a publicity photo shoot of multiple aircraft with General Electric engines flying in formation near Edwards Air Force Base. With the Valkyrie in a spin, pilot Alvin S. White ejected and survived, but centrifugal force prevented Cross' ejection seat from retracting into the escape capsule.
Nick Piantanida		29 August 1966	United States	The 34-year-old skydiver died four months after an attempt to break the record for the highest parachute jump near Joe Foss Field, Sioux Falls, South Dakota; his suit had depressurized, causing brain damage from lack of oxygen.
Jayne Mansfield, Samuel Brody, and Ronnie Harrison		29 June 1967	United States	The 34-year-old American actress and Playboy model died when the driver of her 1966 Buick Electra 225 crashed into a tractor which had abruptly stopped to make way for an approaching mosquito insecticide fog-spraying truck, which released clouds of insecticide that obscured the tractor. Brody, her lover, and Harrison, the driver, also died, but her children, including Mariska Hargitay, who was 3 years old at the time, survived. Many people speculated that the accident was the result of a Satanic curse.
Harold Holt		17 December 1967	Australia	The 59-year-old Prime Minister of Australia disappeared, presumed drowned, while swimming at Cheviot Beach near Portsea, Victoria. He was "simply one of the number of ordinary Australians who drown each year through poor judgment or bad luck"; his drowning has been described as "not unusual", and as "an ordinary death, a shockingly banal one that still befalls dozens every summer." Holt's disappearance gave rise to a variety of unfounded conspiracy theories.
Albert Dekker		5 May 1968	United States	The 62-year-old American actor and politician was found dead kneeling naked in his bathtub with a noose wrapped around his neck, a dirty hypodermic needle in each arm, a scarf over his eyes, a ball in his mouth secured to his head with wire, his wrists in handcuffs, and leather belts and thongs around his torso, one of them tied to a rope around Dekker's ankles. There were vulgar phrases and drawings in lipstick all over his body. His death was ruled an accidental case of erotic asphyxiation.

== 1970s ==
Name of person	Image	Date of death	Country	Details
Alan Fish		20 May 1970	United States	On 16 May, while watching a Los Angeles Dodgers–San Francisco Giants game, the 14-year-old was struck in the head by a Manny Mota foul ball, causing an intracerebral hemorrhage. He was sent to the hospital the next morning following a seizure and taken off life support two days later due to apparent brain death; he is the first fan in Major League Baseball history to die of injuries caused by a foul ball.
Georgy Dobrovolsky, Vladislav Volkov, and Viktor Patsayev		29 June 1971	N/A	The Soviet cosmonauts died when their Soyuz 11 spacecraft depressurized during preparations for re-entry. They are the only reported human deaths outside the Earth's atmosphere.
Professor Zovek		10 March 1972	Mexico	The 31-year-old Mexican escape artist and illusionist was descending from a helicopter by rope during a stunt in Cuautitlán. The helicopter suddenly ascended and flew in circles, leading him to lose his grip and fall 15 m (49 ft) to his death.
John Dimmer		5 July 1974	United Kingdom	While working in saturation aboard oil platform Sedco 135F in the British Sector of the North Sea, the 27-year-old British commercial diver suffered a pneumothorax during decompression. The diving supervisor recognized Dimmer's condition, but the onshore physician consulted by the platform incorrectly diagnosed Dimmer as suffering from pneumonia. As a result, decompression continued, and Dimmer's pneumothorax proved fatal.
Deborah Gail Stone		8 July 1974	United States	The 18-year-old hostess for the America Sings attraction at Disneyland died after being crushed between two walls around 11:00 pm. It is speculated that she either fell backward or tried to jump from one stage to another.
Christine Chubbuck		15 July 1974	United States	The 29-year-old American news anchor from Hudson, Ohio, shot herself in the head on live television at the start of Suncoast Digest, a local newscast for WXLT-TV in Sarasota, Florida, after reading some of the area's breaking news headlines. Chubbuck was the first person to take their own life on live television.
Alex Mitchell		24 March 1975	England	After watching the "Kung Fu Kapers" episode of The Goodies, the resident of King's Lynn, Norfolk, laughed continuously for 25 minutes and then fell dead on his sofa from heart failure due to what doctors discovered years later, via his granddaughter, was a genetic condition called Long QT syndrome.
Roger Baldwin and Peter Holmes		9 September 1975	Scotland	After a bell dive while working in saturation aboard the semi-submersible drill rig Waage Drill II in the North Sea, British commercial divers Baldwin, 24, and Holmes, 29, died of hyperthermia due to a large amount of helium being pumped into the diving chamber complex in response to an apparent pressure leak. The supervisor had mistakenly been monitoring the pressure in the diving bell rather than in the chamber complex.
Mark Frechette		27 September 1975	United States	The 27-year-old American-Canadian film actor, known for playing the lead role in the 1970 film Zabriskie Point, died while in prison for bank robbery when a barbell fell on his neck while he was weightlifting.
Luciano Re Cecconi		18 January 1977	Italy	The 28-year-old professional footballer for S.S. Lazio and the Italy national football team was shot while pretending to rob a jeweller as a practical joke.
Tom Pryce and Frederick Jansen van Vuuren		5 March 1977	South Africa	Pryce, a Welsh Formula One driver in the 1977 South African Grand Prix, struck and killed Van Vuuren at 170 miles per hour (270 km/h) as Van Vuuren ran across the Kyalami racetrack to extinguish a burning car. The fire extinguisher which Van Vuuren was carrying struck Pryce's head and killed him.
Kurt Gödel		14 January 1978	United States	The 71-year-old logician and mathematician developed an obsessive fear of being poisoned and refused to eat food prepared by anyone but his wife. When she became ill and was hospitalized, he starved to death. At the time of his death, he only weighed around 65 pounds (29 kg).
Georgi Markov		11 September 1978	England	The Bulgarian dissident writer was poisoned on a London street via a micro-engineered pellet containing ricin, fired into his leg from an umbrella wielded by an assassin associated with the Bulgarian Secret Service. Markov died four days later in hospital. No one was ever charged with the assassination.
Robert Williams		25 January 1979	United States	The Ford plant worker became the first person known to be killed by a robot when a factory robot's arm struck him in the head.
John Bowen		13 December 1979	United States	While attending a 9 December NFL game at Shea Stadium, the 20-year-old native of Nashua, New Hampshire was struck in the head by a radio-controlled aircraft shaped like a lawn mower being flown by a local model plane club during halftime. He died four days later. Another spectator was also injured, but recovered.

== 1980s ==
Name of person	Image	Date of death	Country	Details
Lourdes Maria da Silva		3 August 1980	Brazil	The resident of Caxias do Sul, was walking upstairs carrying a Pyrex tableware when she tripped, broke it, and fell on the shards, cutting an artery in her neck. She died on her way to the hospital.
Azaria Chamberlain		17 August 1980	Australia	The 9-week-old infant was dragged off and killed by a wild dingo during a family camping trip to Uluru in the Northern Territory. This was the first recorded instance of a dingo killing a human. Azaria's parents, Lindy and Michael Chamberlain, received intense media speculation due to the perceived implausibility of a dingo attack; in a highly-publicized trial, Lindy was convicted of murder and Michael named as an accessory. Their convictions were later overturned after Azaria's matinee jacket was discovered in an area with many dingo lairs nearby.
John Bjornstad, Forrest Cole, and Nick Mullon		19 March 1981 — 11 April 1995	United States	At Kennedy Space Center in Florida, five workers suffered anoxia due to pure nitrogen atmosphere in the aft engine compartment of Space Shuttle Columbia during a countdown demonstration test for the STS-1 mission. Fifty-one-year-old John Bjornstad died at the scene, 50-year-old Forrest Cole went into a coma and died two weeks later, and Nick Mullon died 14 years later from complications of injuries sustained.
Boris Sagal		22 May 1981	United States	The 57-year-old Ukrainian-American film director died while shooting the TV miniseries World War III in Portland, Oregon, after he walked into the tail rotor blades of a helicopter and was partially decapitated.
6 members of Druzhina and Korzh families		Summer 1981 — 1990s	Soviet Union	In 1979, a caesium-137 capsule from a radiometric level sensor was lost in a quarry in Donetsk Oblast. It got mixed with crushed stone and embedded in a concrete wall panel between apartments' children's bedrooms in a residential building constructed in Kramatorsk in 1980. Soon after moving in, the residents of apartment 85 began to experience symptoms of radiation sickness, which was mistaken for hereditary anemia by physicians; all four family members subsequently died. In the family of the next residents, one child also died and another became terminally ill. The source of radiation was discovered and removed in 1989.
David Alan Kirwan		21 July 1981	United States	The 24-year-old tourist from La Cañada Flintridge, California, jumped into the alkaline (pH 9) and scalding (202 °F, or 94 °C) Celestine Pool at Yellowstone National Park to save his friend's dog. The dog died within moments and its body dissolved in the hot spring. Kirwan, blinded and burned over his entire body, was airlifted to Salt Lake City and died the next day.
William Holden		12 November 1981	United States	The 63-year-old American actor slipped on a rug in his apartment while intoxicated, gashed his head open on a bedside table and bled to death without calling for help. His body was discovered four days later.
David Grundman		February 1982	United States	The 24-year-old American maintenance worker illegally shot a 26-foot (7.9 m) saguaro cactus in the Sonoran Desert. An arm of the cactus was detached and fell on Grundman, crushing him to death.
Vic Morrow, Myca Dinh Le and Renee Shin-Yi Chen		23 July 1982	United States	During the filming of Twilight Zone: The Movie, the 53-year-old Morrow, seven-year-old Le, and six-year-old Chen were performing a scene in which their characters are pursued by a helicopter. Heat from special-effects explosions caused the helicopter to fall on them. Morrow and Le were decapitated and Chen was crushed.
Dick Wertheim		15 September 1983	United States	The 61-year-old tennis linesman died after a ball served by player Stefan Edberg at the US Open struck him in the groin and he fell out of his chair, striking his head on the hardcourt surface.
Truls Hellevik		5 November 1983	Norway	The 34-year-old Norwegian diver was explosively dismembered in a diving bell accident on the North Sea Byford Dolphin drilling rig. Three other divers, 35-year-old Edwin Arthur Coward, 38-year-old Roy P. Lucas and 29-year-old Bjørn Giæver Bergersen, and 32-year-old dive tender William Crammond, were also killed. Crammond opened the clamp before Hellevik could close the chamber door. The nine-atmosphere air pressure explosively decompressed, instantly forcing Hellevik's body through a 60-centimetre-diameter (24 in) opening, fragmenting it into numerous pieces. The other tender, Martin Saunders, was severely injured.
Jimmy Ferrozzo		23 November 1983	United States	The bouncer at the Condor Club in San Francisco died while engaging in sexual intercourse with his girlfriend, Theresa Hill, on a grand piano that was lowered from the ceiling by a hydraulic motor. He accidentally activated the lifting mechanism which pinned him against the ceiling, leading to his suffocation. Hill survived the accident.
Reginald Tucker		4 July 1984	United States	The 29-year-old lawyer, who raced along a Chicago skyscraper corridor without wearing his glasses, crashed through a window and plunged 39 stories to his death during an early Fourth of July party. Police said portions of the man's body were scattered around the street near the 41-story Prudential Building in the city's downtown area. Several horrified onlookers attending holiday celebrations heard the glass shatter and saw him fall to his death.
Jon-Erik Hexum		18 October 1984	United States	The 26-year-old American actor died after playing a simulated Russian roulette with a .44 Magnum pistol loaded with blanks. They contained paper wadding and when he pulled the trigger against his temple, the wadding was propelled with a force that broke his skull, causing massive brain bleeding.
Jason Findley		21 May 1985	United States	The 17-year-old, from Piscataway, New Jersey, was electrocuted during a thunderstorm when a lightning strike caused an electrical surge to shoot through the wire of a telephone the boy was holding and enter his left ear, causing his heart to stop beating.
Victims of the Lake Nyos disaster		21 August 1986	Cameroon	At Lake Nyos, northwestern Cameroon, a limnic eruption of unknown cause released about 100,000–300,000 tons of carbon dioxide (CO_{2}) from the lake's bed. The gas cloud initially rose at nearly 100 kilometres per hour (62 mph; 28 m/s) and then, being heavier than air, descended onto nearby villages, suffocating people and livestock within 25 kilometres (16 mi) of the lake, resulting in the death of 1,746 people and 3,500 livestock.
Marc Aaronson		30 April 1987	United States	The 36-year-old astronomer was crushed to death by a hatch and a revolving telescope dome at Kitt Peak National Observatory.
Franco Brun		9 June 1987	Canada	The 22-year-old inmate from Toronto being held at the Metro Toronto East Detention Centre in Scarborough, Ontario, died while trying to swallow a pocket-size Bible.
Billy Snedden		26 June 1987	Australia	The 60-year-old former Opposition leader died of heart failure while having sexual intercourse with his son's ex-girlfriend hours after attending John Howard's election campaign launch.
Ivan Lester McGuire		2 April 1988	United States	The 35-year-old veteran skydiver from Durham, North Carolina, was recording a jump by an instructor and student from the Franklin County Sports Parachute Center in Louisburg, North Carolina, when he jumped from a plane without a parachute. Focused on the recording process, he apparently forgot to put one on, and his camera equipment may have been mistaken by others in the plane for one. The tape from his helmet camera was partially recovered.
Clarabelle Lansing		28 April 1988	United States	On Aloha Airlines Flight 243 from Hilo to Honolulu, Hawaii, the 58-year-old flight attendant was blown out of the Boeing 737-209 30,000 feet (9,100 m) above the Pacific Ocean when the plane experienced explosive decompression due to metal fatigue.
3 people and Cachy the poodle		21 October 1988	Argentina	A poodle named Cachy, in Caballito, Buenos Aires, fell 13 floors and hit 75-year-old Marta Espina, killing both instantly. In the course of events, 46-year-old Edith Solá came to see the incident and was fatally hit by a bus. An unidentified man who witnessed her death had a heart attack and also died on his way to the hospital.
Naoyuki Kanno		28 February 1989	Japan	The deceased body of a 26-year-old employee of a nuclear power maintenance company was found horizontally wedged inside a septic pipe connected to a toilet at the teacher's living quarters of a local elementary school in Miyakoji village, Fukushima. To extract him, rescuers had to excavate the lavatory and cut the pipe open because the 36-centimetre (14 in) wide outlet was too small to pull him out manually.

== 1990s ==
Name of person	Image	Date of death	Country	Details
Daniel John O'Brien		14 January 1990	Trinidad and Tobago	The 31-year-old American tourist took his own life by jumping into one of the engines of a British Airways Boeing 747 at Piarco International Airport, Trinidad. He is said to have scaled an airport wall in the nude, stolen a vehicle from four security guards, and smeared himself with grease before hurling himself into one of the plane's engines.
Parker Turner		17 November 1991	United States	The 39-year-old American cave diver died in the partial collapse of an underwater cave during a dive at Indian Springs, Florida. Of the several hundred cave diving deaths in Florida between 1960 and 2010, Turner's was the only one caused by a partial cave collapse.
Ramon Prado Jr.		9 May 1992	United States	The 3-year-old boy from Santa Ana was killed when a rear tire of the minibus on which he was riding blew out, causing its steel treads to burst through the floor of the bus, snatch him from the arms of his mother and throw him onto Interstate 5 in Oceanside, California, where he was struck by the bus and at least one other vehicle.
Greg Austin Gingrich		28 November 1992	United States	While the 38-year-old was vacationing at the Grand Canyon in Coconino County, Arizona, with his teenaged daughter, he began to play-act losing his balance to frighten her. His daughter, unimpressed with his antics, walked on. Gingrich, however, missed his footing and fell approximately 400 feet (120 m) into the canyon to his death.
Brandon Lee		31 March 1993	United States	The 28-year-old film actor, martial artist, and son of Bruce Lee was killed by a squib-loaded prop gun while filming The Crow.
Garry Hoy		9 July 1993	Canada	The 39-year-old lawyer from Toronto fell to his death from the 24th floor of the Toronto-Dominion Centre while demonstrating that its windows were "unbreakable". He threw himself against one, which, true to his assertion, did not break, but instead popped out of its frame.
Victims of the Khamar-Daban incident		5 August 1993	Russia	Six Kazakhstani hikers died in the Khamar-Daban mountain range in Buryatia under uncertain circumstances. According to Valentina Utochenko, the sole survivor of the seven-person hiking group, while descending the mountain, each of the climbers, except her, suffered from a mysterious symptom involving screaming, bleeding from eyes and ears, frothing at the mouth, and clawing at their throat or clothes before dying.
Gloria Ramirez		19 February 1994	United States	The 31-year-old died from kidney failure related to her cervical cancer at the emergency room of Riverside General Hospital in Riverside, California. While treating her, several of the hospital staff became ill, suffering from loss of consciousness, shortness of breath, and muscle spasms. Shortly before dying, she was allegedly covered with an oily sheen, which smelled of fruit and garlic.
75 people on board Aeroflot Flight 593		23 March 1994	Russia	Relief captain Yaroslav Kudrinsky brought his two teenaged children to the cockpit of an Airbus A310 during an international passenger flight and allowed them to sit at the controls. His 15-year-old son unknowingly disengaged the autopilot; the aircraft was sent into a nosedive and crashed, with all occupants killed on impact.
Jeremy T. Brenno		9 July 1994	United States	The 16-year-old from Gloversville, New York, was playing golf when he hit a bench out of frustration with his club. This caused the club's shaft to break and pierce Brenno's heart, killing him.
Sharon Lopatka		16 October 1996	United States	The 35-year-old exchanged emails with her killer, Robert Glass, in which she said she wanted to be "tortured to death"—an apparent case of consensual homicide.
JonBenét Patricia Ramsey		26 December 1996	United States	The 6-year-old winner of multiple child beauty pageants was reported missing by her mother, who found a strange ransom note in her kitchen the morning after Christmas. The girl's body was soon found in her family's home basement with fractured skull, a garrote tied around her neck and evidence of sexual assault. No one was ever arrested or charged in the case, which remains unsolved.
39 members of Heaven's Gate		22 March 1997 — 23 March 1997	United States	39 members of the UFO religion Heaven's Gate in Rancho Santa Fe, California, consumed mixtures of phenobarbital and vodka before suffocating themselves with plastic bags, believing that doing so would transport them to a spacecraft behind the approaching Comet Hale-Bopp. Among the dead was Thomas Nichols, brother of Star Trek actress Nichelle Nichols.
Quimby Ghilotti		2 June 1997	United States	The 18-year-old from Napa, California, died on a school field trip when students tried to fit as many kids as possible on a water slide, causing it to collapse under their combined weight. At least 30 others were injured.
Karen Wetterhahn		8 June 1997	United States	The 48-year-old chemistry professor at Dartmouth College died ten months after a few drops of dimethylmercury (an organomercury compound and one of the strongest-known neurotoxins) landed on her protective gloves. Although she had been following the required procedures, it permeated the gloves and her skin within seconds.
Jonathan Capewell		29 July 1998	England	The 16-year-old from Oldham died from a heart attack brought on by the buildup of butane and propane in his blood after excessive use of deodorant sprays. He was reported to have been obsessed with personal hygiene.
Bena Tshadi soccer team		28 October 1998	DR Congo	All 11 members of the Bena Tshadi soccer team located in Kasaï-Central, were struck by lightning and killed during a match against a team from Basanga. 30 others, including spectators and members of the Bena Tshadi team on the sidelines, were injured. No members of the Basanga soccer team were injured. No official cause has been reported; however, The Guardian reported that researchers suggest that it was because the Bena Tshadi team used screwed-in metal cleats that conducted electricity whereas the Basanga team used moulded cleats.
Unknown man		24 February 1999	United States	The 32-year-old was driving a pick-up truck near Vacaville, California, when a motorist driving the opposite direction collided with a 340 kilograms (750 lb) cow that had stepped onto the road. The cow was sent airborne and struck the windshield of the pick-up driver, who died from massive head trauma. A third car crashed into the cow carcass, but was unharmed.
John Lewis		12 April 1999	England	The 64-year-old businessman from Minsterworth, attempted to light a bonfire with gasoline, but inadvertently set his clothes on fire. He then ran to the River Severn, jumped in, and eventually drowned. His body was not found until 30 April 1999.
Valerie Olusanya		25 April 1999	England	The 35-year-old electronic musician, better known as Kemistry, was a front-seat passenger in a car travelling on the M3 motorway in Hampshire, behind a van which dislodged a cat's eye in the road. The metal body flew through the windscreen hitting Olusanya in the face, killing her instantly.
Owen Hart		23 May 1999	United States	The 34-year-old Canadian professional wrestler fell to his death during the World Wrestling Federation's Over the Edge pay-per-view event. He was supposed to be lowered into the ring from the rafters as part of his Blue Blazer persona's entrance, but the equipment lowering him into the ring malfunctioned, causing him to fall 78 feet (24 m) and land chest-first on the top rope. The impact severed his aorta, causing death within minutes.
Bryan Loudermilk		7 June 1999	United States	The 28-year-old father of three was found pinned beneath a rear tire of his car at his trailer home in Okeechobee, Florida. He was initially conscious, albeit unable to feel his legs before dying of traumatic asphyxia at a hospital the same day. He had willingly laid down in a shallow ditch and allowed an unidentified woman to park the car on his torso to fulfill a crush fetish, unsuccessfully using a pillow and a wooden board as cushioning. The death was deemed accidental. It was later found that Loudermilk and his wife Stephanie Tongkeamha had previously produced and sold several pornographic crushing videos in which the latter killed mice and rabbits by stepping on them.
Jon Desborough		10 June 1999	England	The 41-year-old geography and physical education teacher died due to a chest infection a month after being impaled in the eye with the blunt end of a javelin during an athletics session at the Liverpool College in Mossley Hill, Liverpool. It is believed that he had lost his footing while retrieving the javelin. He remained in a coma until his death.
Daniel Dukes		6 July 1999	United States	The 27-year-old American's mutilated, naked body was found draped over Tilikum the Orca's back at SeaWorld Orlando in Florida. His death was ruled an accidental drowning after trespassing into the whale's tank.

== Works cited ==
- Cannon, Sarita (2021). "Red, Black, and Blue: Jimi Hendrix's Musical Self-Expression". Black-Native Autobiographical Acts: Navigating the Minefields of Authenticity. Lexington Books. ISBN 978-1-7936-3057-5.
