= McCullar =

McCullar is a surname.

== Notable people ==
- Bernice Brown McCullar (1904–1975), American writer and educator
- Kenneth D. McCullar (1918–1943), American military pilot
- Kevin McCullar Jr. (born 2001), American basketball player
- Valarie Johnson McCullar, American musician and member of Sounds of Blackness
