= Golden Mile, Toronto =

Golden Mile
- Commercial district
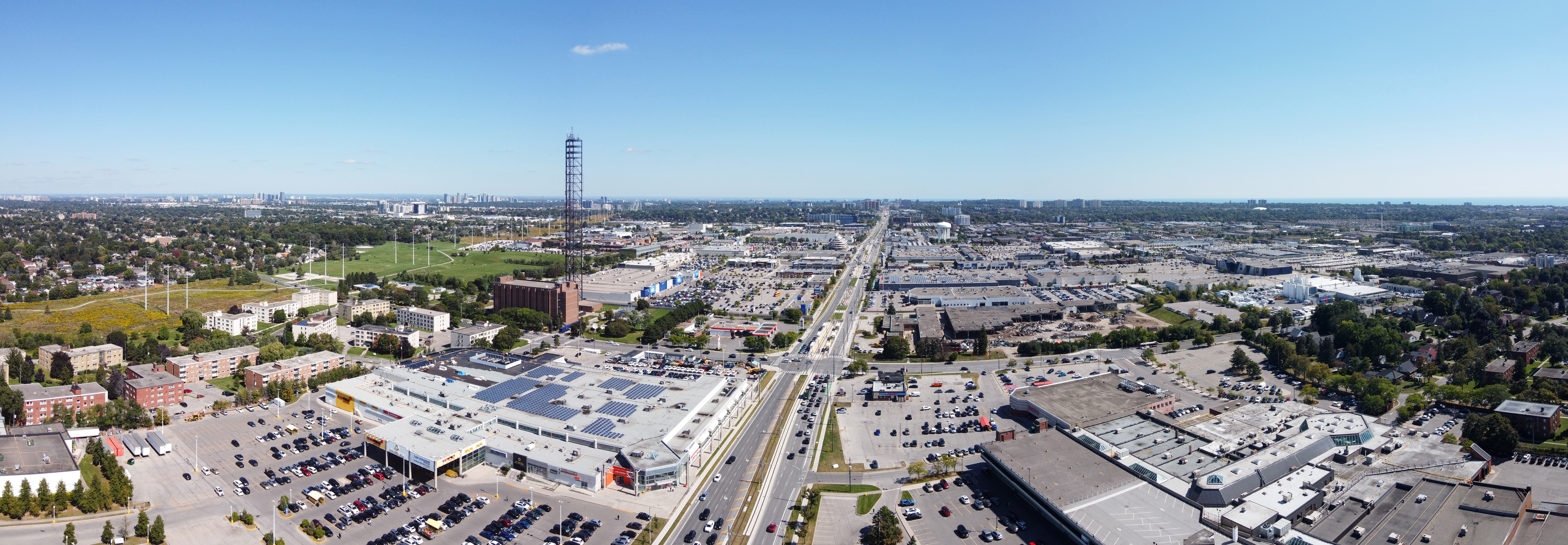
- The Golden Mile along Eglinton Avenue

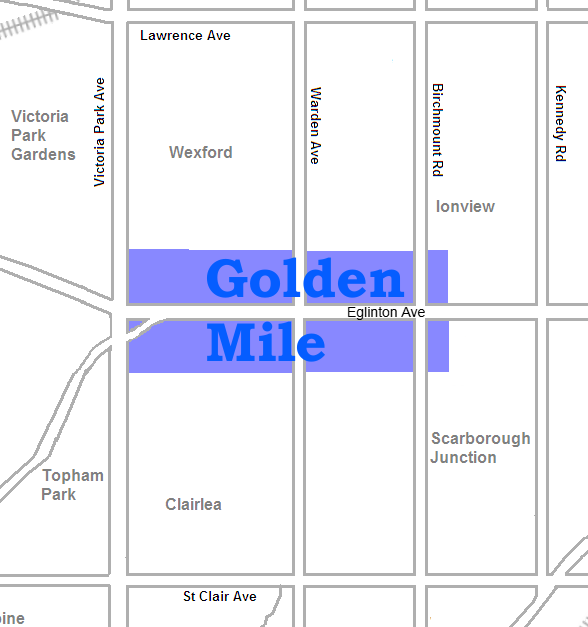
- Coordinates: 43°43′32″N 79°17′50″W
- Country: Canada
- Province: Ontario
- City: Toronto
- Established municipality: 1850 Scarborough Township
- Changed municipality: 1998 Toronto from City of Scarborough

Government
  - MP: Bill Blair (Scarborough Southwest)
  - MPP: Doly Begum (Scarborough Southwest (provincial electoral district))
  - Councillor: Gary Crawford (politician), Ward 20 Scarborough Southwest & Michael Thompson, Ward 21 Scarborough Centre

The Golden Mile is a commercial district in the Scarborough district of Toronto, Ontario, Canada. Situated along Eglinton Avenue East, east of Victoria Park Avenue, it was one of Canada's first model industrial parks. The original Golden Mile of Industry ran along Eglinton from Pharmacy Avenue east to Birchmount Road.

== History ==
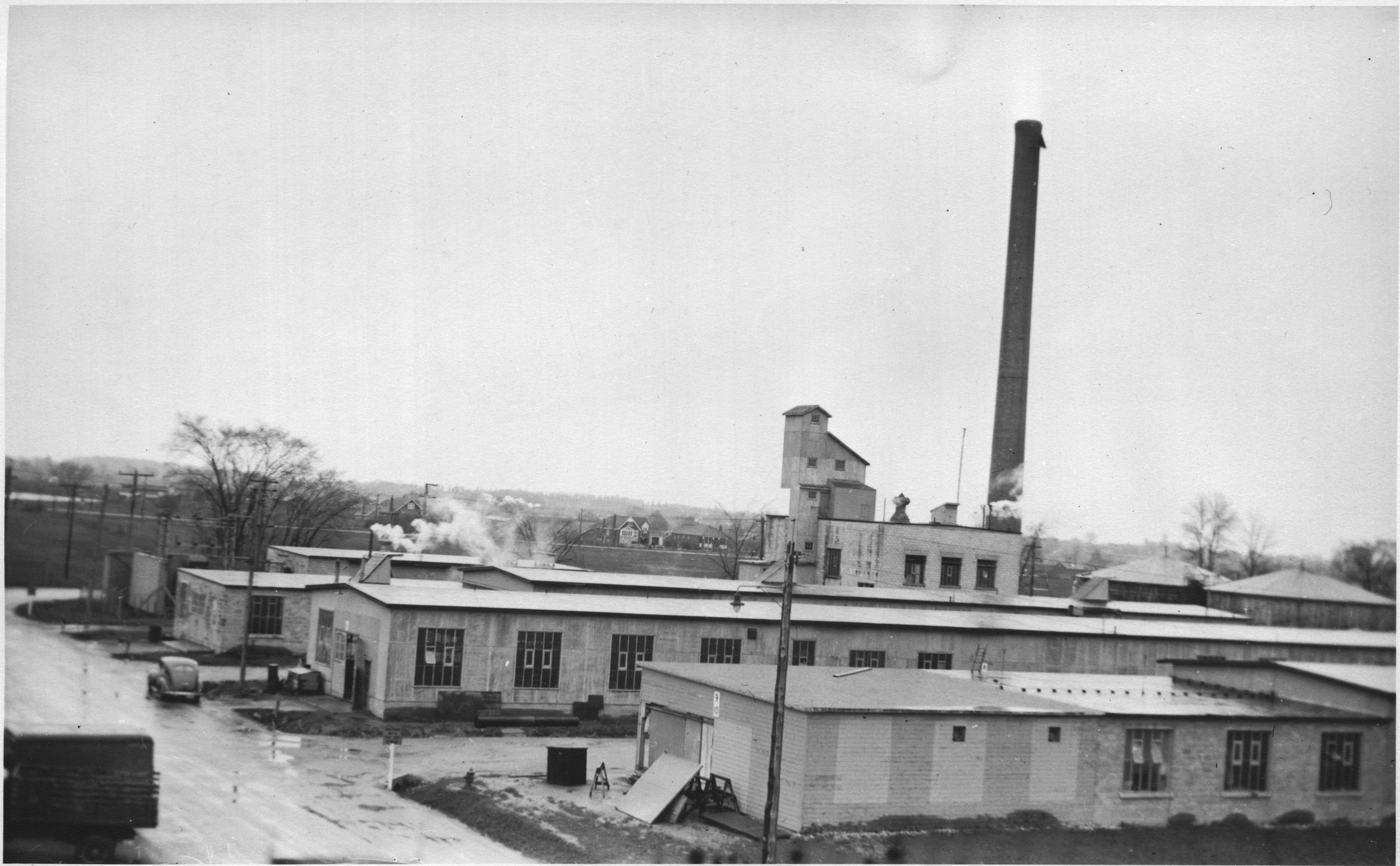
General Engineering Company (Canada) factory

The area was farmland before World War II, with settlement by Scottish immigrants beginning in the 1820s (notably by the likes of the McCowans and Thompsons) and before settlement by Europeans in the late 18th century, the area was mostly covered by forests.

The corner of Birchmount and Eglinton was known as Hough's Corner. for Henry Hough's Hough Carriage Works (c. 1846). The carriage maker later became a blacksmith shop. A replica work shop with original tools is found at Scarborough Museum.

In the 1940s, the Government of Canada acquired 250 acres (100 ha) in this area to build munitions plants for Canada's involvement in World War II. The area, which was then far from the city, was chosen so that any accidental detonations would cause less harm. In 1941, a massive munitions plant, General Engineering Company of Ontario (GECO), was constructed southeast of Eglinton and Warden. At its peak, 5,300 people worked at the plant; 256,567,485 munitions were produced over the course of the war. Following the war, the area and 14 buildings were purchased from the Government of Canada by the Township of Scarborough under the leadership of its reeve, Oliver E. Crockford. The township built municipal offices and a library along Eglinton and sold the rest to private industry to develop the area as "The Golden Mile", patterned after the Golden Mile in London, England. In the 1950s and 1960s, numerous factories producing mostly consumer goods operated along the Golden Mile, including a 34 hectares (84 acres) General Motors van assembly plant.

Further west, retail uses developed, including the Golden Mile Plaza and the Eglinton Square Shopping Centre. Suburban residential development was built surrounding the industrial area. Due to the success of the Golden Mile, further east along Eglinton between Birchmount and Kennedy, the Ionview neighbourhood was developed, with a large number of apartment buildings fronting Eglinton, making it a compact apartment neighbourhood.

Today, little industrial uses exist on Eglinton Avenue, while some industrial uses remain off Eglinton on side streets. Around the year 2000, the south section of Eglinton development of the former van plant property was being redeveloped into a new trend at the time, American-style "big box" retail uses.

== Redevelopment ==
In 2014, the City of Toronto government and Metrolinx conducted a preplanning exercise called Eglinton Connects to create walkable, mixed-use developments along the Eglinton Crosstown LRT. One area for such development is the Golden Mile site between Victoria Park Avenue and Pharmacy Avenue, which will be served by two LRT stops. City planning officials said that, although there is weak demand for new condos in central Scarborough, the LRT is stimulating demand for development.

The initiative led to the Golden Mile Secondary Plan, which was adopted by Toronto City Council in 2020 and brought into effect, with modification, by the Ontario Land Tribunal in December 2024. The plan provides a framework for transforming the area into a mixed-use, transit-oriented community through the introduction of new residential development, employment opportunities, parks, community facilities, and an expanded street network. Proposed infrastructure changes include the realignment of O'Connor Drive, the extension of Civic Street, modifications to Ashtonbee Road and Pharmacy Avenue, and the creation of new public open spaces.

In 2025, the City of Toronto launched the Golden Re:Gen Study to establish a renews vision for portions of the Golden Mile that had recently been redesignated as Regeneration Areas. The study aims to guide future mixed-use development while balancing employment, housing, and public spaces.

== Economy ==
=== List of businesses ===
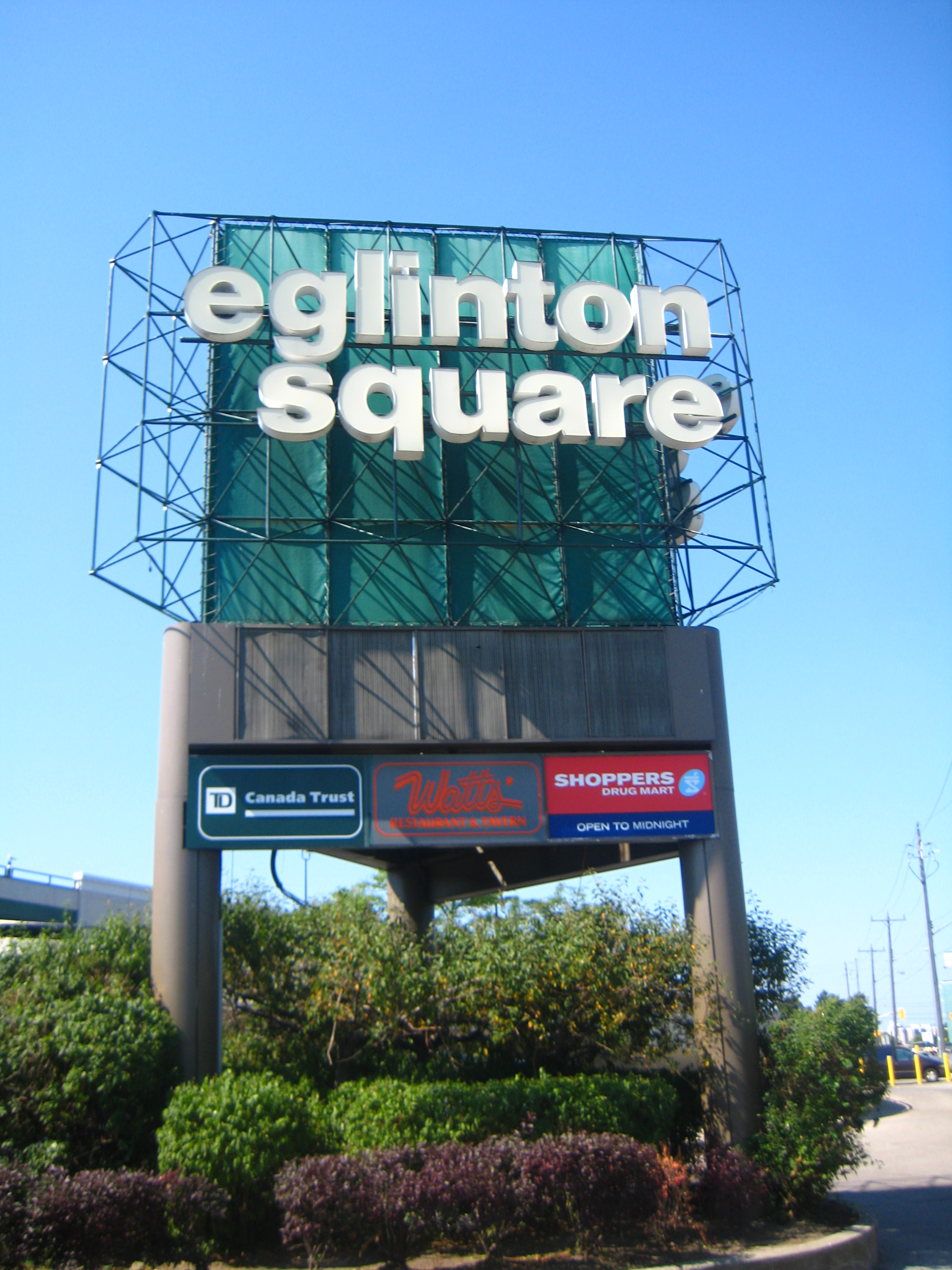
Eglinton Square Shopping Centre is one of several shopping centres located in the Golden Mile.

The Golden Mile is home to a number of shopping malls and plazas, including:

- Eglinton Corners
- Eglinton Square Shopping Centre
- Eglinton Town Centre
- Smart Centres Scarborough West
- RioCan Scarborough Centre

==== Golden Mile Mall ====
Golden Mile Plaza was added west of the industrial "mile" in 1954 and was visited in 1959 by Queen Elizabeth II marking the further transformation of the area into a series of strip malls.

The original strip mall on the north of Eglinton Avenue was anchored by a Famous Players movie theatre located at Pharmacy Avenue and Eglinton. The west section of the strip was severely damaged by a fire in 1986, which hastened the beginning of the transformation of the area into one of Toronto's largest concentrations of power centres and big-box stores.

The plaza was replaced with the first Loblaws branded Super Store within Toronto and a few other retail stores. Its building was not a mall and was not comparable to the variety of retail stores and services it replaced. Other stores that were originally part of the strange design of the building were a Fabricland and a Zellers, which closed in the 2000s. The superstore was rebranded as a No Frills, and much later Toronto Employment and Social Services, popular retailer Joe Fresh (part of Loblaws), Fit 4 Less, and a dollar store became tenants in 2010, using space that Zellers and Fabricland had previously occupied.

In 2017, the property owner Choice Properties REIT announced a redevelopment of the 19-acre site into a mixed-use, transit-oriented development. It will include a mix of buildings of various heights and a new Loblaws supermarket. The development will create new streets surrounding nine city blocks and include a public park and a public square. The first phase will entail the construction of the new supermarket, the demolition of the existing mall, and the construction of new streets through the project. This redevelopment is still in the proposal state, along with all other proposed redevelopment pending completion of the Golden Mile Secondary Plan Study.

== Institutions ==
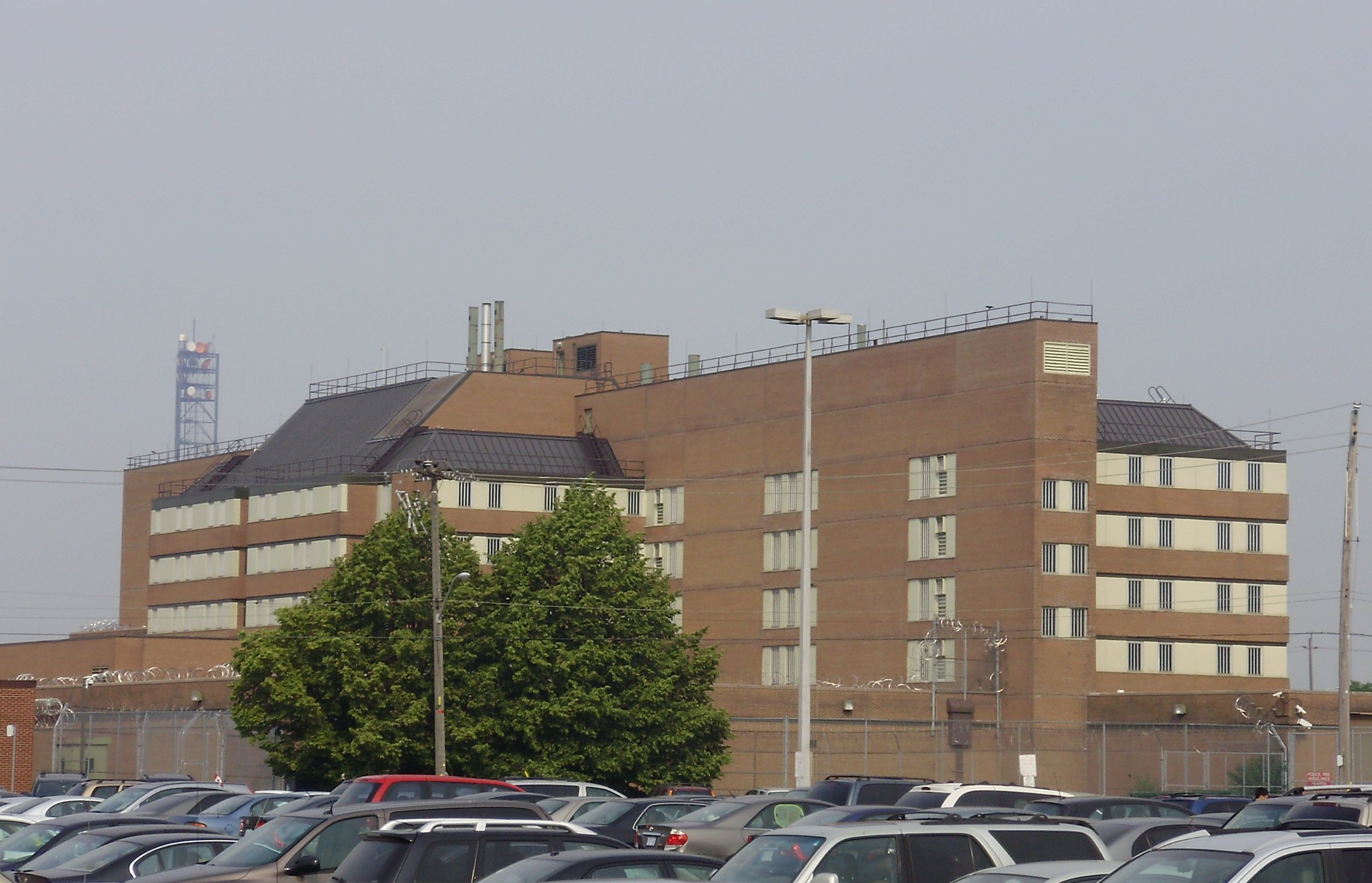
The Toronto East Detention Centre is a remand centre operated by the provincial government.

The Golden Mile is home to several services operated by the City of Toronto government, including the Toronto Public Library, whose Eglinton Square branch is located in the neighbourhood. The Government of Canada also operates several institutions in the neighbourhood, including a provincial courthouse, as well as the Toronto East Detention Centre. The Toronto East Detention Centre is a remand centre operated by the Ministry of Community Safety and Correctional Services.

== Demographics ==
Although the Golden Mile itself historically contained little residential development, the community is home to a large and diverse population. According to a City of Toronto planning report based on the 2016 Census, approximately 54% of residents in the surrounding study area are immigrants, compared with a slightly lower proportion across Toronto as a whole. Among immigrants who arrived between 2011 and 2016, the Philippines was the most common country of birth, followed by Sri Lanka, India, and China. Tamil, Arabic, and Greek are among the most commonly spoken languages at home other than English.
