= Eglinton Square =

Eglinton Square Shopping Centre
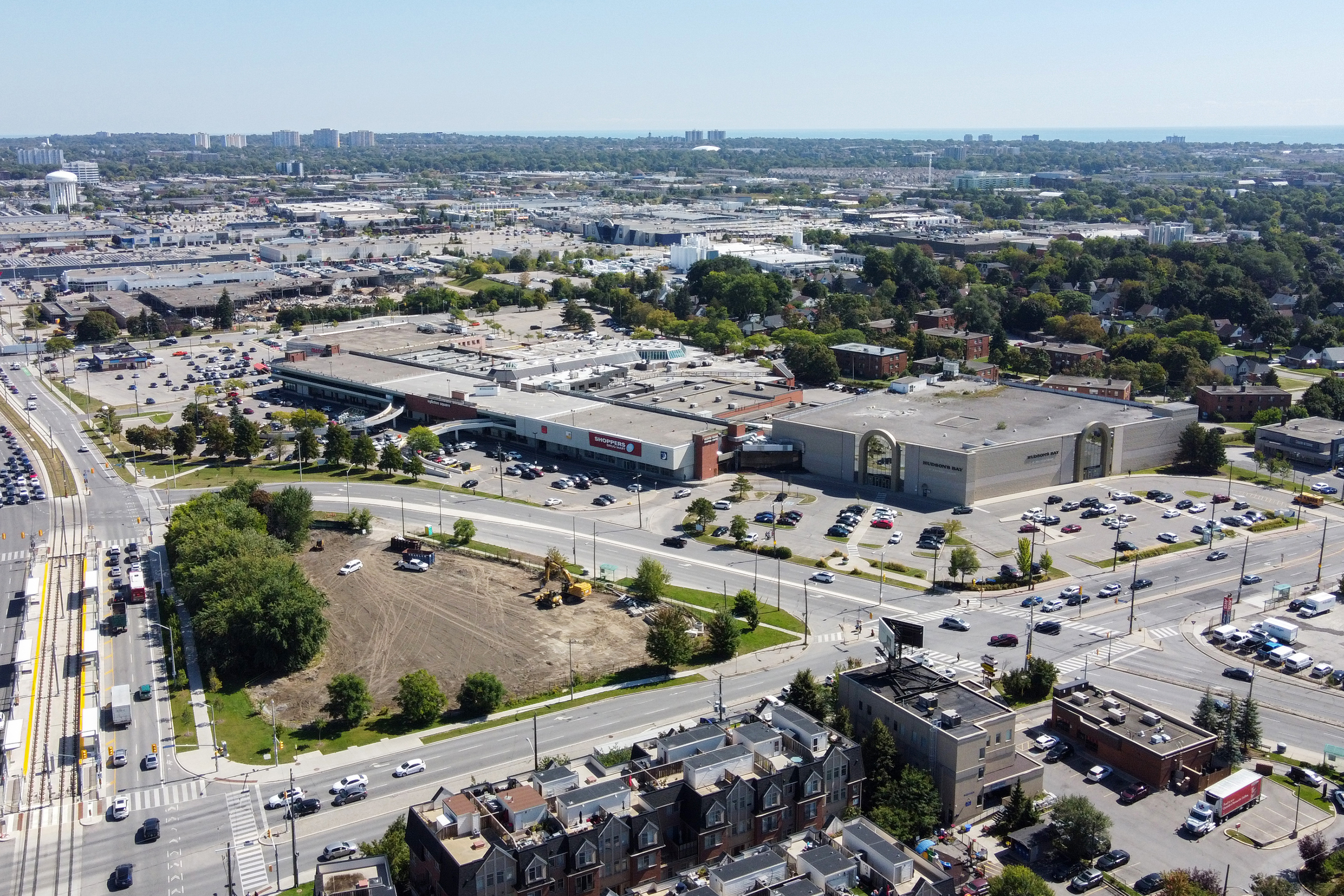
- Eglinton Square in 2023
- Location: Toronto, Ontario, Canada
- Coordinates: 43.7236°N 79.2996°W
- Address: 1 Eglinton Square
- Opened: 1953
- Developer: Oxford Properties
- Owner: Kingsett Capital, Bentall Kennedy (Canada) LP
- Num. of stores: 80+
- Num. of anchor tenants: 2
- Floor area: 279,000 sq ft (25,900 m^{2})
- Floors: 1
- Website: eglintonsquare.ca

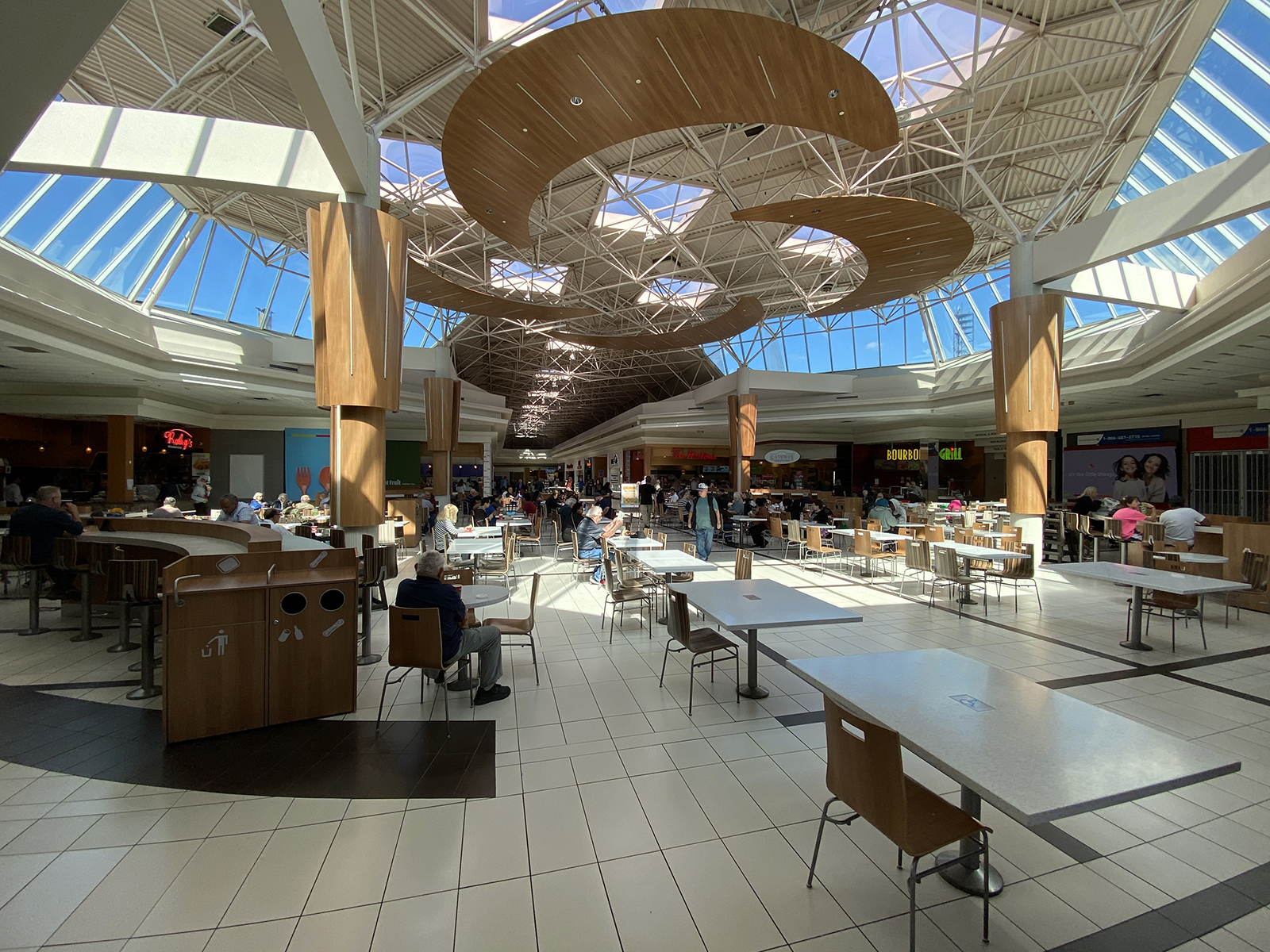
Food Court

Eglinton Square Shopping Centre is an enclosed shopping mall in Toronto, Ontario, Canada, located at Eglinton Avenue East and Victoria Park Avenue in Scarborough's Golden Mile neighbourhood. It opened in 1953 as a strip plaza and was later converted to a mall.

The Eglinton Square Shopping Centre is owned by Kingsett Capital and under the management of Bentall Kennedy (Canada) LP. It has approximately 279,000 sq ft (25,900 m^{2}) of retail space with over 80 retail outlets.

The shopping centre is slated for major redevelopment, with high density condo buildings as part of the mix.

== History ==
The mall was opened to the public in 1953 in an area once settled by farmland in the 1820s and re-developed as industrial land during World War II along Eglinton Avenue and surrounded by residential homes to the north, south and west sides. Built at the cost 1.6 million$, Eglinton Square was expanded two years later. In 1957, the shopping centre was visited by Queen Elizabeth II.

Up until the early 1960s, Eglinton Square had two Dominion supermarkets, one at each end of the plaza. In the spring 1963, the Dominion at the western end of the shopping centre was torn down to make room for an upcoming two story Morgan's department store of 120,000 square feet. Morgan's officially opened on August 22, 1963. It was notable for having a parking garage attached to the shopping centre with room for 573 cars including those parked in the roof of the store. It was the first Morgan's store opened by the Hudson's Bay Company following its acquisition of the chain in 1960. Unlike its two other Morgan's locations at Lawrence Plaza and Cloverdale Mall which were leases, Hudson's Bay Company wholly owned the store at Eglinton Square. Morgan's eventually became a The Bay store.

In 1964, Eglinton Square was enlarged of 25 stores from the 31 existing ones and essentially became an enclosed shopping mall. In addition, a multi-level parking for 500 cars was to be installed on top of the new extension. To this day, the main shopping centre still has two 1960s style ramps that provide two levels of parking on top of the stores.

The mall's perimeter is being redeveloped for mixed and residential use (condo towers and townhouses) including demolition of existing low rise apartments along Engelhart Crescent.

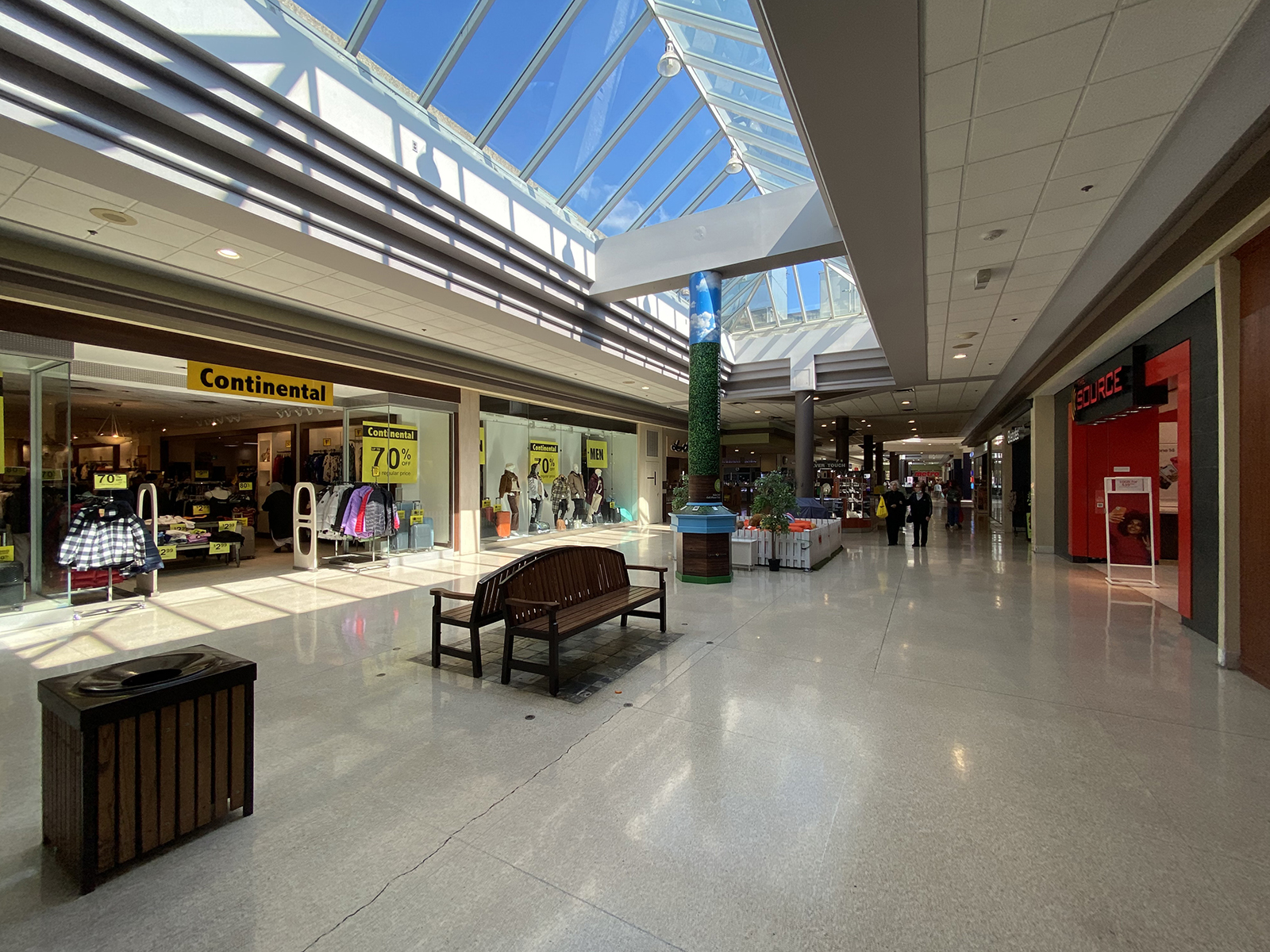
Mall inside

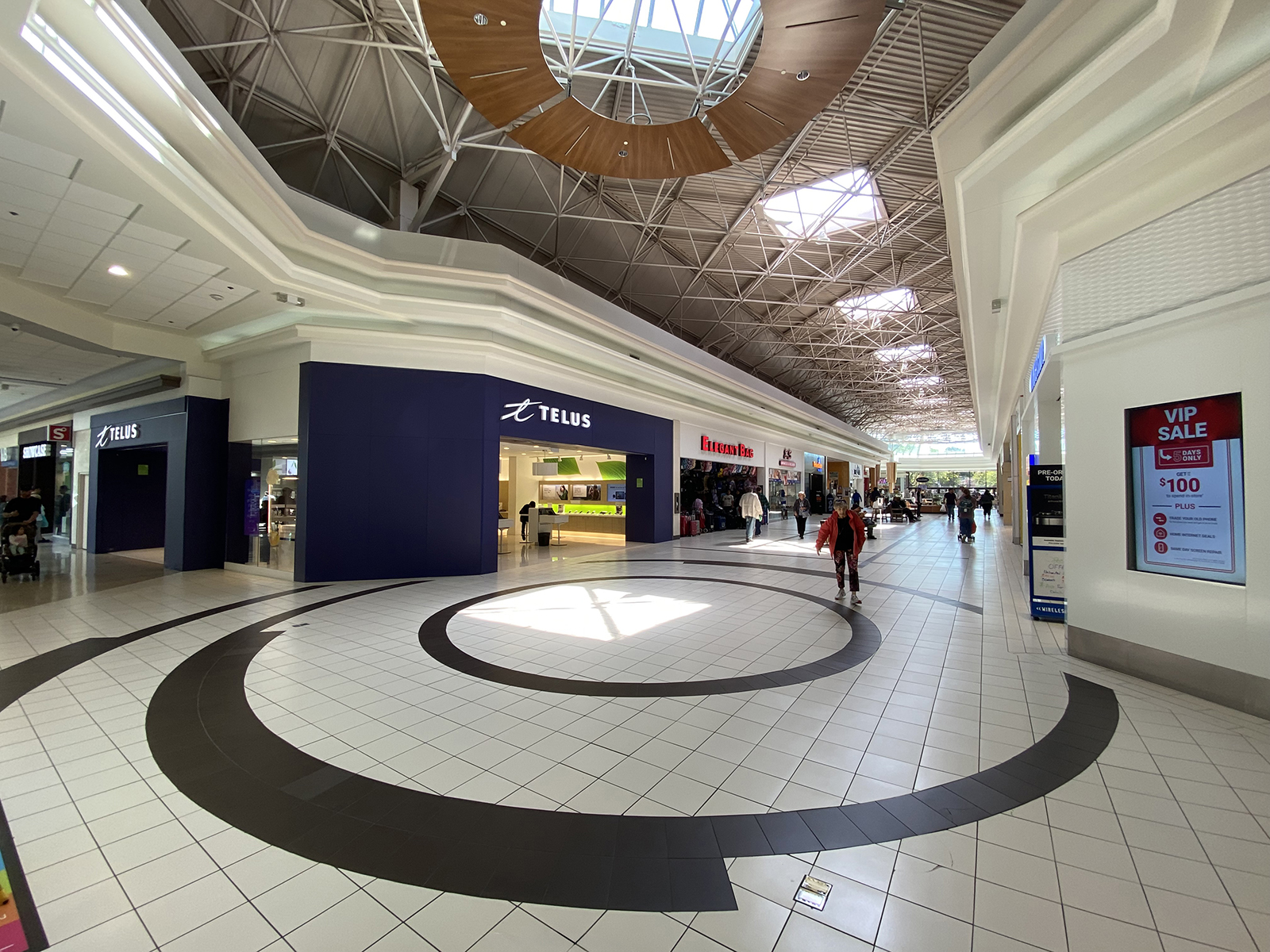
Fountain demolished after the renovation around 2018

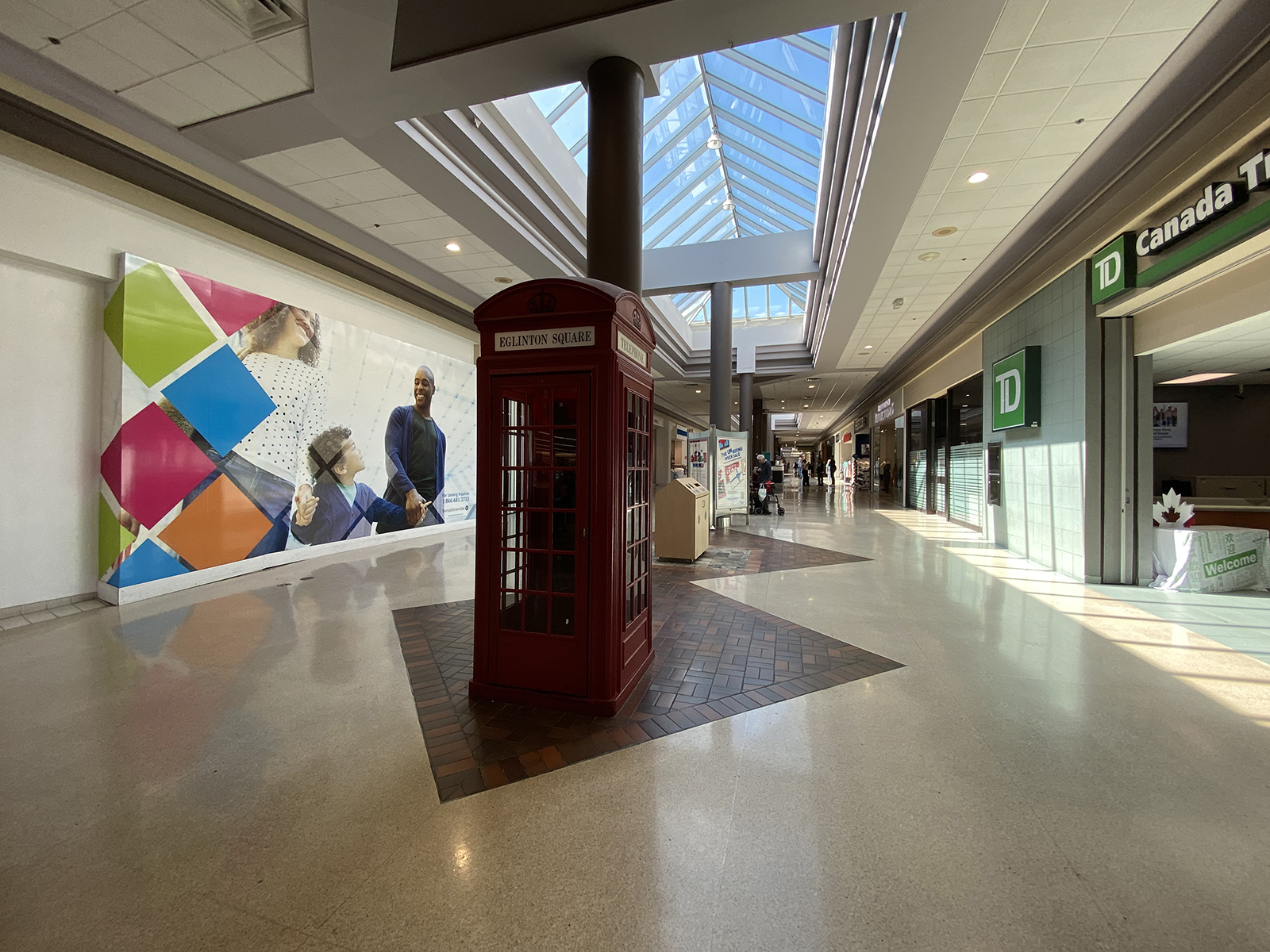
Red telephone box purchase by developer in 1987

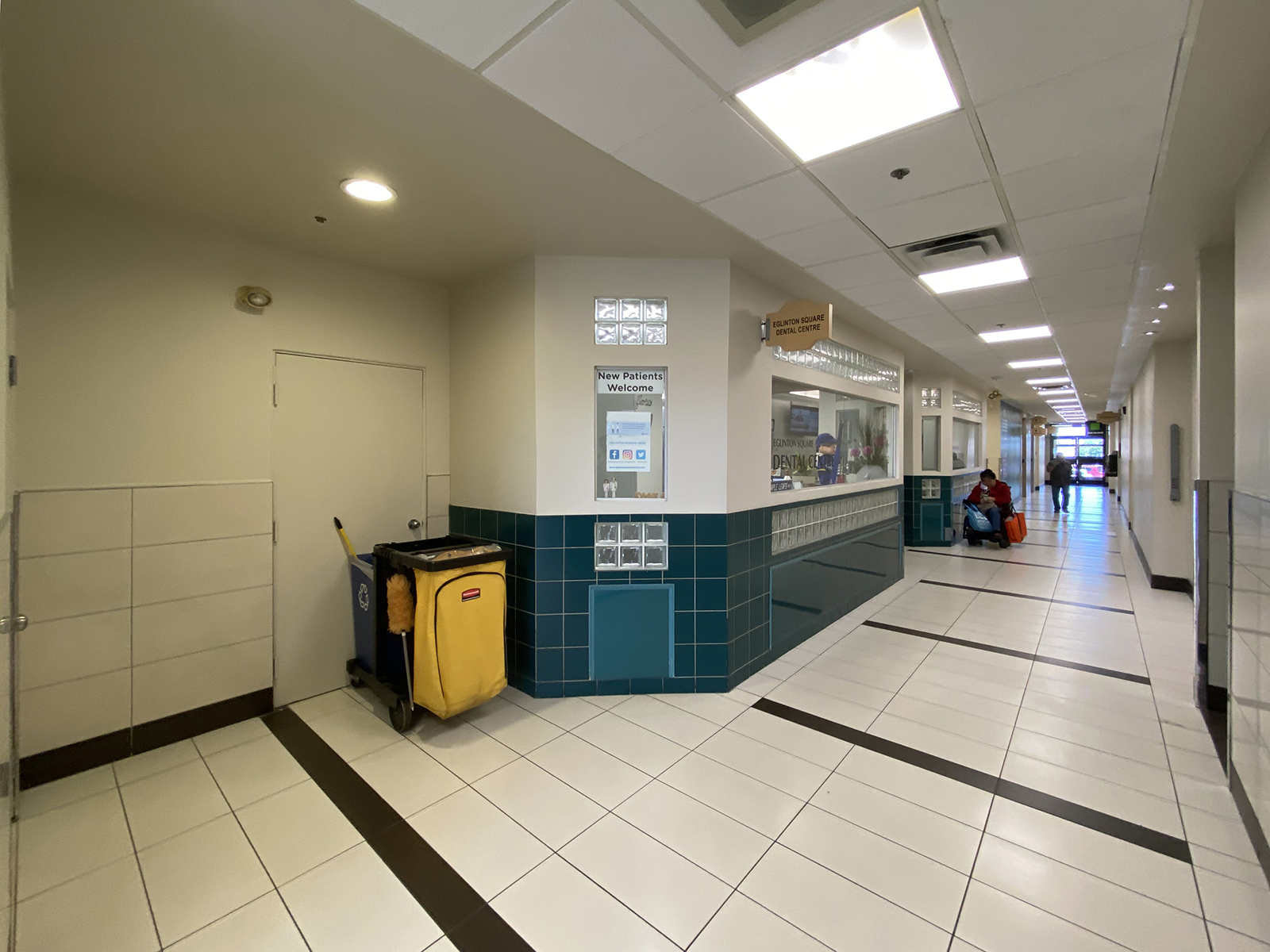
Dental Centre

== See also ==
- List of shopping malls in Toronto
