= Thomas Lynn Bradford =

American spiritualist (1872/1873–1921)

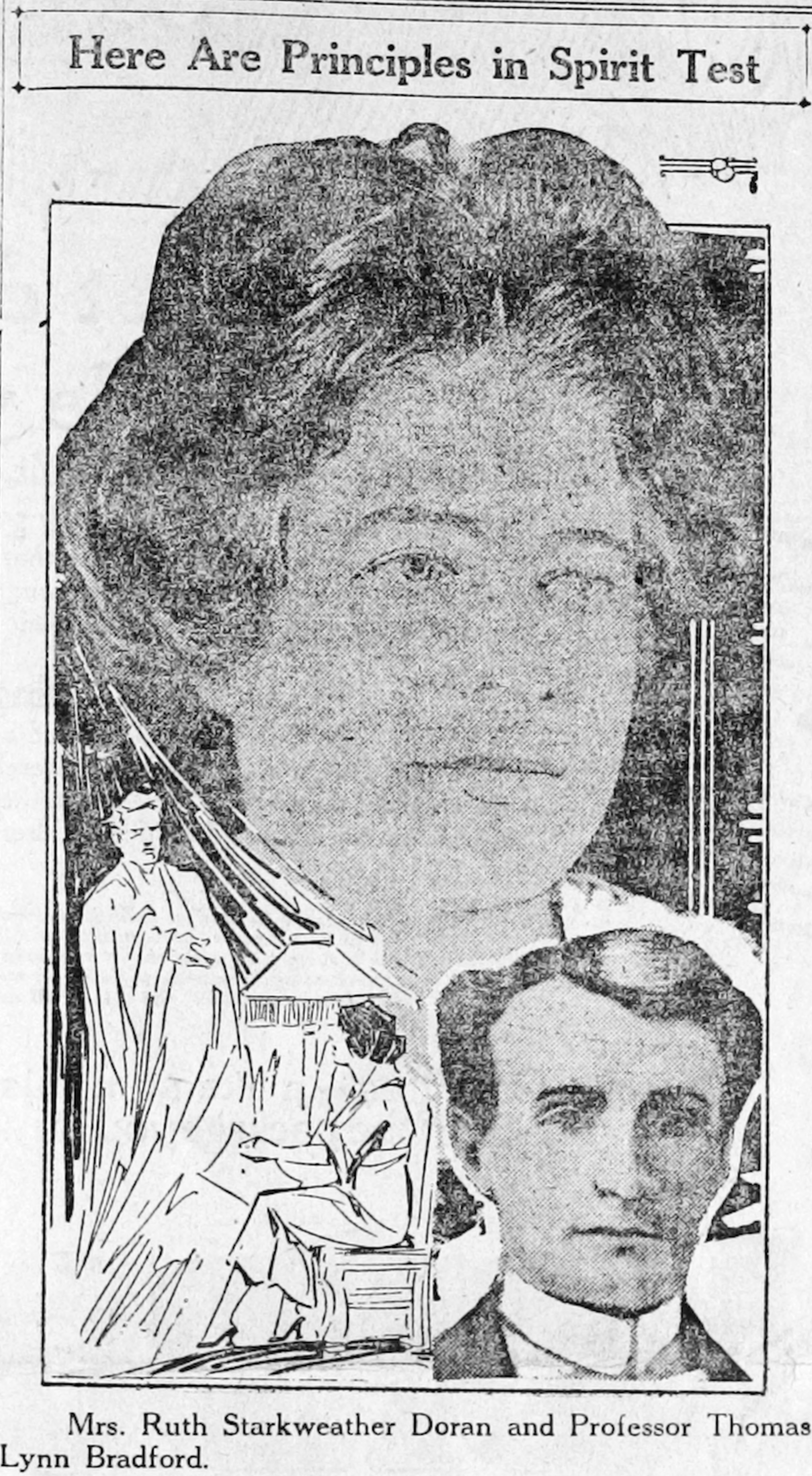
- Ruth Starkweather Doran and Thomas Lynn Bradford
- Born: 1872 or 1873
- Died: February 5, 1921 (aged 48)
- Cause of death: Suicide by household gas
- Known for: Trying to prove the existence of an afterlife

Thomas Lynn Bradford (1872 or 1873 – February 5, 1921) of Detroit, Michigan, was a spiritualist who died by suicide in an attempt to ascertain the existence of an afterlife and communicate that information to a living accomplice, Ruth Doran. On February 5, 1921, Bradford sealed his apartment in Detroit, blew out the pilot on his heater, and turned on the gas, which killed him.

Some weeks earlier, Bradford had sought a fellow spiritualist in a newspaper advertisement, and Doran responded. The two agreed "that there was but one way to solve the mystery—two minds properly attuned, one of which must shed its earthly mantle". The New York Times ran a follow-up under the headline "Dead Spiritualist Silent".

== See also ==
- List of unusual deaths in the 20th century
