= Pope, Mississippi =

- Village
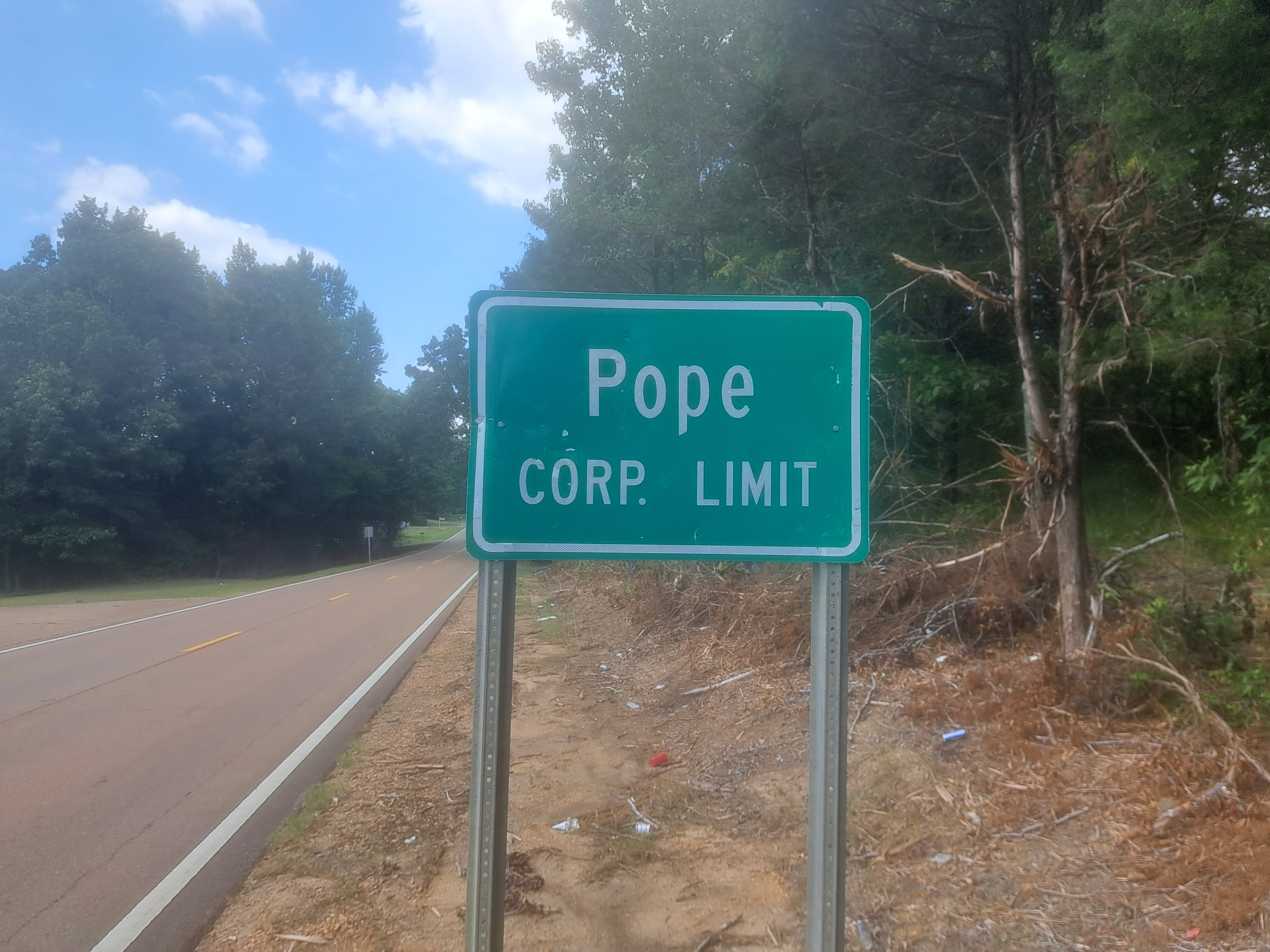
- Highway sign showing Pope's corporate limits

- Location of Pope, Mississippi

- Location in the United States
- Coordinates: 34°12′57″N 89°56′41″W
- Country: United States
- State: Mississippi
- County: Panola

Area
  - Total: 1.45 sq mi (3.75 km^{2})
  - Land: 1.45 sq mi (3.75 km^{2})
  - Water: 0 sq mi (0.00 km^{2})
- Elevation: 272 ft (83 m)

Population (2020)
  - Total: 268
  - Density: 184.9/sq mi (71.38/km^{2})
- Time zone: UTC-6 (Central (CST))
  - Summer (DST): UTC-5 (CDT)
- ZIP code: 38658
- Area code: 662
- FIPS code: 28-59240
- GNIS feature ID: 2407529
- Website: pope.panolams.com

Pope is a village in Panola County, Mississippi, United States. As of the 2020 census, Pope had a population of 268.

== Geography ==
According to the United States Census Bureau, the village has a total area of 1.0 square mile (2.6 km^{2}), all land.

== Demographics ==
Historical population
| Census | Pop. | Note | %± |
|---|---|---|---|
| 1880 | 181 | | — |
| 1900 | 172 | | — |
| 1910 | 163 | | −5.2% |
| 1920 | 278 | | 70.6% |
| 1930 | 190 | | −31.7% |
| 1940 | 248 | | 30.5% |
| 1950 | 246 | | −0.8% |
| 1960 | 246 | | 0.0% |
| 1970 | 210 | | −14.6% |
| 1980 | 208 | | −1.0% |
| 1990 | 171 | | −17.8% |
| 2000 | 241 | | 40.9% |
| 2010 | 215 | | −10.8% |
| 2020 | 268 | | 24.7% |
U.S. Decennial Census

As of the census of 2000, there were 241 people, 88 households, and 69 families residing in the village. The population density was 238.4 inhabitants per square mile (92.0/km^{2}). There were 96 housing units at an average density of 95.0 per square mile (36.7/km^{2}). The racial makeup of the village was 83.82% White, 14.52% African American, and 1.66% from two or more races.

There were 88 households, out of which 40.9% had children under the age of 18 living with them, 56.8% were married couples living together, 17.0% had a female householder with no husband present, and 20.5% were non-families. 17.0% of all households were made up of individuals, and 9.1% had someone living alone who was 65 years of age or older. The average household size was 2.74 and the average family size was 3.09.

In the village, the population was spread out, with 28.6% under the age of 18, 8.3% from 18 to 24, 27.8% from 25 to 44, 18.7% from 45 to 64, and 16.6% who were 65 years of age or older. The median age was 36 years. For every 100 females, there were 95.9 males. For every 100 females age 18 and over, there were 100.0 males.

The median income for a household in the village was $33,125, and the median income for a family was $30,000. Males had a median income of $30,893 versus $18,750 for females. The per capita income for the village was $13,543. About 11.5% of families and 11.6% of the population were below the poverty line, including 8.3% of those under the age of eighteen and 22.5% of those 65 or over.

== Education ==
The Village of Pope is served by the South Panola School District. Residents are zoned to Pope Elementary/Junior High School in Pope and South Panola High School in Batesville. Pope Elementary School does offer pre-k classes to a limited number of students (2 classrooms).

== Notable people ==
- Kenneth D. McCullar, skip-bomber pilot of WWII
- Dennis Baker, Mississippi legislator and judge
- Cliff Finch, governor of Mississippi from 1976 to 1980
- Charles "Bobo" Shaw, jazz drummer
