= Dennis Baker (politician) =

American politician (1927–2014)

Dennis Murphree Baker
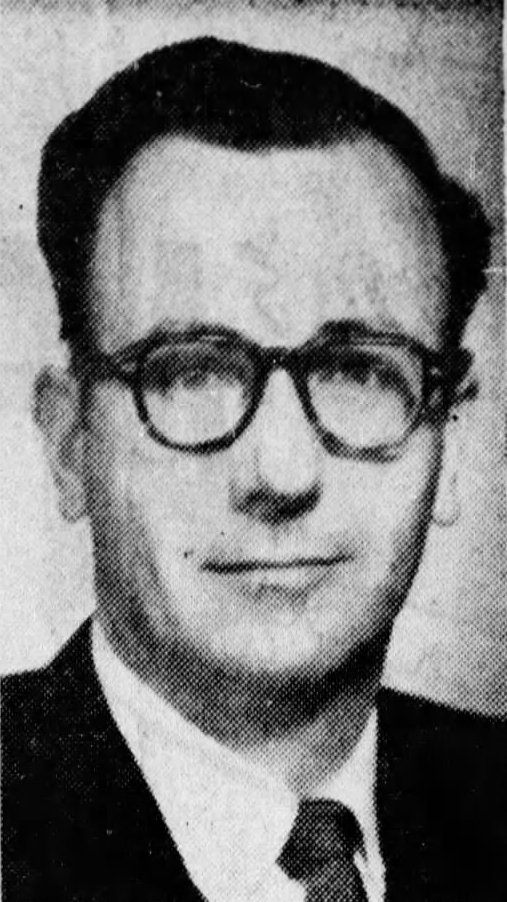
- Baker circa 1962

Member of the Mississippi House of Representatives

Mississippi State Senator

Personal details
- Born: July 1, 1927 Pope, Mississippi, U.S.
- Died: February 10, 2014 (aged 86) Oxford, Mississippi, U.S.

Dennis Murphree Baker (July 1, 1927 – February 10, 2014) was an American lawyer and politician. He served two terms in the Mississippi House of Representatives and one term in the Mississippi State Senate. He also served as a judge in the 3rd district of the Mississippi Chancery Courts for over 25 years.

As of 1962, Baker was in his first term in the state senate, having previously completed his two terms in the state house.

On March 15, 1978, Baker was appointed as senior chancellor for the Third Chancery Court District of Mississippi.
