= Dick Wertheim =

American tennis linesman

Richard Wertheim (c. 1923—September 15, 1983) was an American tennis linesman who suffered a fatal injury on September 10, 1983, during a match at the 1983 US Open. He was injured when Stefan Edberg sent an errant serve directly into his groin. Wertheim was sitting in a chair and officiating at the center line. The blow knocked him backwards and he fell out of the chair onto the hardcourt surface, striking his head. He had a history of chronic cardiovascular disease, having had a heart attack and stroke at age 40 years. Wertheim was unconscious when he was taken to Flushing Hospital Medical Center. He died on September 15. His family sued the United States Tennis Association for $2.25 million. In an opinion suggesting that the impact of the tennis ball had not been the proximate cause of his death, the Appellate Division of the Supreme Court of New York reversed a $165,000 jury award to his estate. Following this event, the International Tennis Federation (ITF) refrained from having linesmen sitting during plays.

== See also ==
- List of unusual deaths in the 20th century
