= Toronto East Detention Centre =

Prison in Ontario, Canada

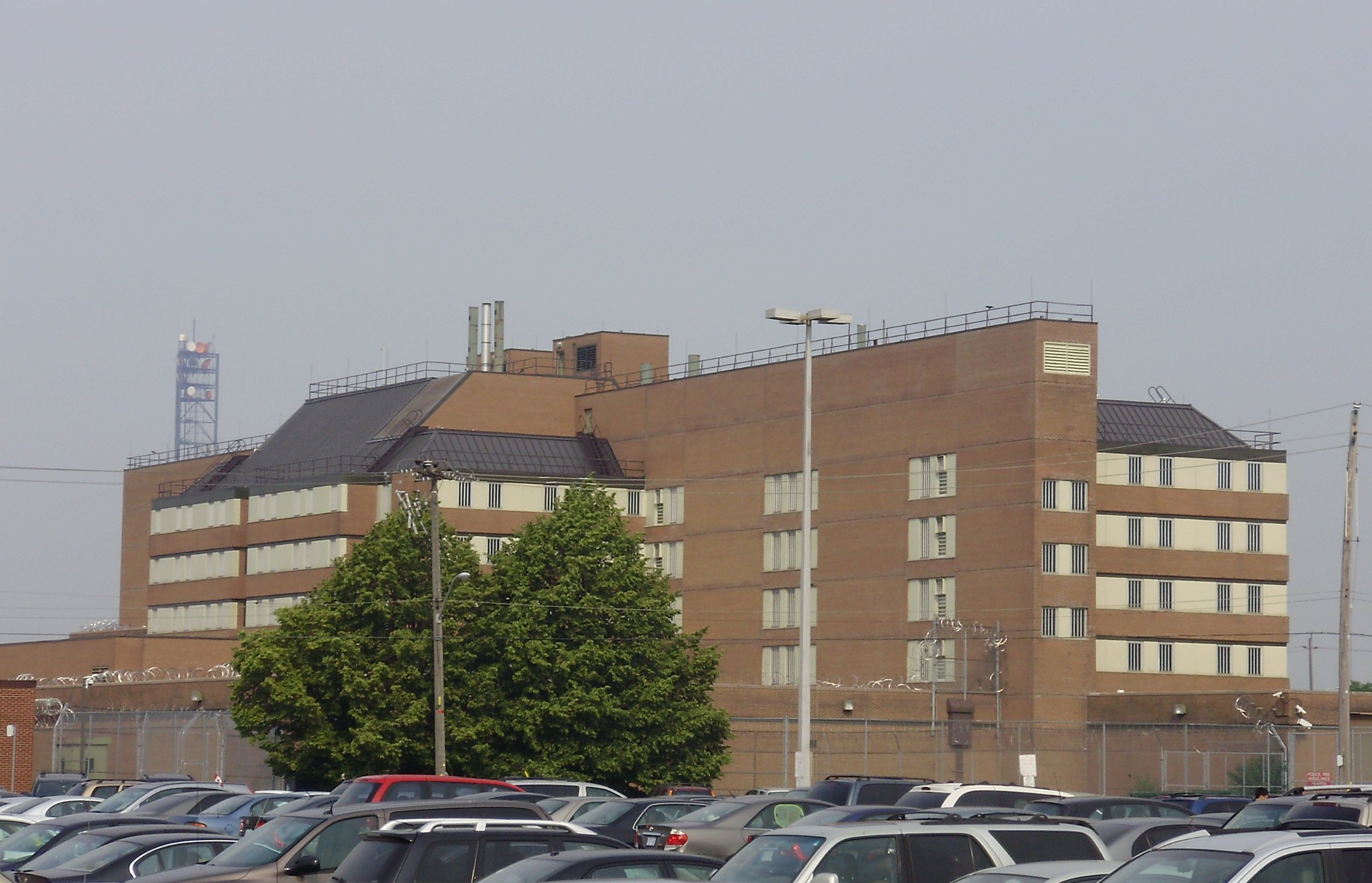
- Interactive map of Toronto East Detention Centre
- Location: 55 Civic Road Toronto, Ontario M1L 2K9; 43.727525°N 79.280337°W
- Status: Operational
- Security class: Maximum security
- Capacity: 473
- Opened: 1977
- Managed by: Ministry of the Solicitor General

The Toronto East Detention Centre, also known as TEDC or The East, is a maximum-security provincial detention centre in Scarborough, Toronto, Ontario, Canada. It is operated by the correctional services division of the Ontario Ministry of the Solicitor General.

It is located at 55 Civic Road, southwest of the intersection of Eglinton Avenue and Birchmount Road in the Golden Mile commercial district in Scarborough. The facility was known as the Metropolitan Toronto East Detention Centre until Metropolitan Toronto was amalgamated in 1998.

While programming is not as extensive as at a federal penitentiary, inmates are provided with a variety of remedial programs, including life skills, addictions, anger management, Alcoholics Anonymous, GED certifications, and volunteer educational services. Inmates have access to two outside yards, approved visits (operating 7 days a week), chaplaincy and religious services, and recreation programs.

== Notable inmates ==
- Snow (musician)
- Paul Bernardo, a serial rapist and serial killer dubbed the Scarborough Rapist. His former wife and accomplice is Karla Homolka.
- Dellen Millard and Mark Smich, who together murdered Laura Babcock and Tim Bosma in separate killings in July 2012 and May 2013, respectively.

== See also ==
- List of correctional facilities in Ontario
