= Kenneth D. McCullar =

American skip-bomber pilot (1918–1943)

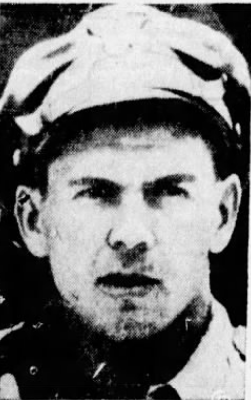
- Born: 30 November 1918; Courtland, Mississippi, US
- Died: 12 April 1943 (aged 24) Papua New Guinea
- Branch: Army Air Forces
- Rank: Major
- Awards: Distinguished Service Cross; Silver Star; Distinguished Flying Cross; Air Medal; Purple Heart

Kenneth Dalton McCullar (30 November 1918 – 12 April 1943) was an American military pilot and skip bombing pioneer in World War II. He was killed in a "freak accident" when his bomber struck a wallaby on takeoff, causing it to crash and explode.

== History ==
McCullar was born to Dalton Webster McCullar and Pauline Watters on 30 November 1918, in Pope, Mississippi.

As a captain in the 63rd Bomb Squadron, McCullar was well-regarded by the men he served with, with an aggressive streak and a love of gambling. At one point, he selected a bomber for himself specifically because the final two digits of its serial number were 21, and named it Black Jack.

== Skip bombing ==
McCullar was noted by General George Kenney as being "especially good" at skip bombing, a technique requiring pilots to approach their targets at high speed and low altitude before releasing a bomb to "skip" across the water. He was trained by Major William Benn and was reportedly a "star pupil" who was "marvelously skilled at flying". He impressed General Kenney at a demonstration of skip bombing after three weeks' training, scoring six hits out of nine runs at a practice target.

McCullar, who was already credited with sinking or damaging four Japanese vessels at the time, took part in the first skip bombing raids on Rabaul in September and October 1942 as Major Benn's copilot, scoring at least one hit during the 2 October raid. He was credited with sinking a Japanese destroyer with two direct hits on 23 October, scoring several hits on 25 October, and hitting and possibly sinking another destroyer on 18 November.

On 24 November, McCullar attacked a convoy of five destroyers, scoring several hits amidst significant anti-aircraft fire. General Kenney praised this attack, writing "Hitler might have had a secret weapon as he claimed, but I'd bet it wasn't as good as Ken McCullar." He performed an aerial reconnaissance of Rabaul on 5 December, and although his B-17 lost two of its four engines early in the mission, he completed the reconnaissance while in a powered glide, returning from the mission with pictures described by Kenney as "...the best ones of Rabaul I've ever seen."

In December, McCullar's plane was struck by anti-aircraft fire from a destroyer which set one of his engines on fire and destroyed another one. Despite this, he was able to sink the destroyer, reportedly saying "I'll teach those so-and-so ack-ack so-and-so's to mess up my airplane." In order to gain enough altitude to return to base through a pass in Kokoda, he ordered all loose cargo to be thrown out of the plane, as well as instructing the crew that they might need to bail out to lighten the plane further.

McCullar led a squadron of twelve B-17s in a skip bombing raid on the night of 18–19 February 1943, resulting in three ships sunk and a fourth damaged.

== Death ==
On the night of 12 April 1943, McCullar's Boeing B-17 Flying Fortress, Blues in the Nite, crashed immediately after takeoff at 7 Mile Drome at Central Province, Papua New Guinea. The bomber struck something during takeoff, referred to in reports as a "brush kangaroo" and later found to be a wallaby. The collision severed the hydraulics, causing the plane to catch fire. It briefly became airborne, but crashed after about 200 yards (180 m), exploding its full load of ordnance and killing all aboard. McCullar's remains were transported to the US and buried in Batesville, Mississippi. He was posthumously awarded the Distinguished Service Cross on 6 May 1943.

== Sources ==
- Birdsall, Steve (1977). Flying Buccaneers: The Illustrated Story of Kenney's Fifth Air Force. Doubleday & Company, Inc. ISBN 0-385-03218-8.
- Gamble, Bruce (2010). Fortress Rabaul: The Battle for the Southwest Pacific, January 1942-April 1943. Zenith Press. ISBN 978-0-7603-2350-2.
- Kenney, George (1949). General Kenney Reports: A Personal History of the Pacific War. Air Force History and Museums Program, 1997 (Original: Duell, Sloane and Pierce). ISBN 0-912799-44-7.
